= Gerald Augustus Harold Bedford =

British entomologist

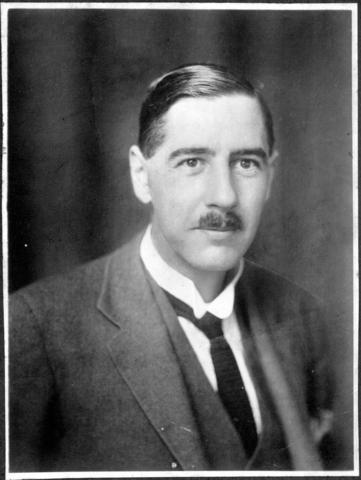
- Bedford, G.A.H.
- Born: May 1891
- Died: 28 January 1938
- Scientific career
- Fields: Biology; Entomology; Parasitology; Phylogenetics
- Institutions: Onderstepoort Veterinary Laboratory
- Author abbrev. (zoology): Bedford, G.A.H.

Gerald Augustus Harold Bedford (May 1891 – 28 January 1938) was a British entomologist of the 20th century who specialised in ticks from South Africa.

He first worked at the British Museum of Natural History with F.V. Theobald and then was nominated as entomologist at the Onderstepoort Veterinary Laboratory in Onderstepoort in 1912. The Onderstepoort Veterinary Laboratory continue to exist as the "Agricultural Research Council - Onderstepoort Veterinary Research". There, he studied vertebrate parasites (mites, ticks and lice). He started to collect species of ticks for the National Tick Collection in 1912, with nymphs of Aponomma exornatum collected in Onderstepoort. In 1920, he was promoted Research Officer in Onderstepoort. He died in 1938 at the age of 46.

== Authored Taxa ==
Between 1912 and 1938, Bedford discovered and described the following species of tick in South Africa :

- Argas peringueyi (Bedford & Hewitt, 1925)
- Rhipicephalus theileri (Bedford & Hewitt, 1925)
- Haemaphysalis cooleyi (Bedford, 1929)
- Ixodes elongatus (Bedford, 1929)
- Nuttalliella namaqua (Bedford, 1931)
- Argas striatus (Bedford, 1932)
- Rhipicephalus distinctus (Bedford, 1932)

== Publications (incomplete) ==
- Bedford, G.A.H. & Hewitt, J. 1925: "Descriptions of two new species of ticks, with notes on rare and hitherto unrecorded species from South Africa". South African Journal of Natural History, 5: 259-266.
- Bedford, G.A.H. 1928: "South African mosquitoes". Rep. Vet. Res. S. Afr., 13 & 14: 883-990.
- Bedford, G.A.H. 1929(Oct): "Anoplura (Siphunculata and Mallophaga) from South African Hosts". 15th Annual Report of the Director of Veterinary Services, Union of South Africa, 15: 501-549.
- Bedford, G.A.H. 1931(Apr): "Nuttalliella namaqua, a new genus and species of tick". Parasitology 23 (2): 230-232. doi:10.1017/S0031182000013573
- Bedford, G.A.H. 1932: "Description of Argas striatus, a new species of tick". 18th Report of the Director of Veterinary Services and Animal Industry, Union of South Africa, 18: 221-222.
- Bedford, G.A.H. 1932: "A synoptic check-list and host-list of the ectoparasites found on South African Mammalia, Aves and Reptilia (2nd ed.)". 18th Report of the Director of Veterinary Services and Animal Industry, Union of South Africa, 18 (2): 223-523.
- Nieschlilz, O., Bedford, G.A.H., Du Toit, R.M. 1934: "Investigations into the transmission of blue-tongue in sheep, during the season 1931/1932". Onderstepoort. J. vet. Sci., 2 (2): 509-562. (Rev. appl. Ent. (B), 22; p. 171).

== See also ==
- Munro, H.K. "Obituary - G.A.H. Bedford". Journal of the Entomological Society of Southern Africa 1939; 1: 149-150.
- Horak, I.G. "A century of tick taxonomy in South Africa". Onderstepoort Journal of Veterinary Research 2009; 76 (1): 69-74. doi:10.4102/ojvr.v76i1.67
