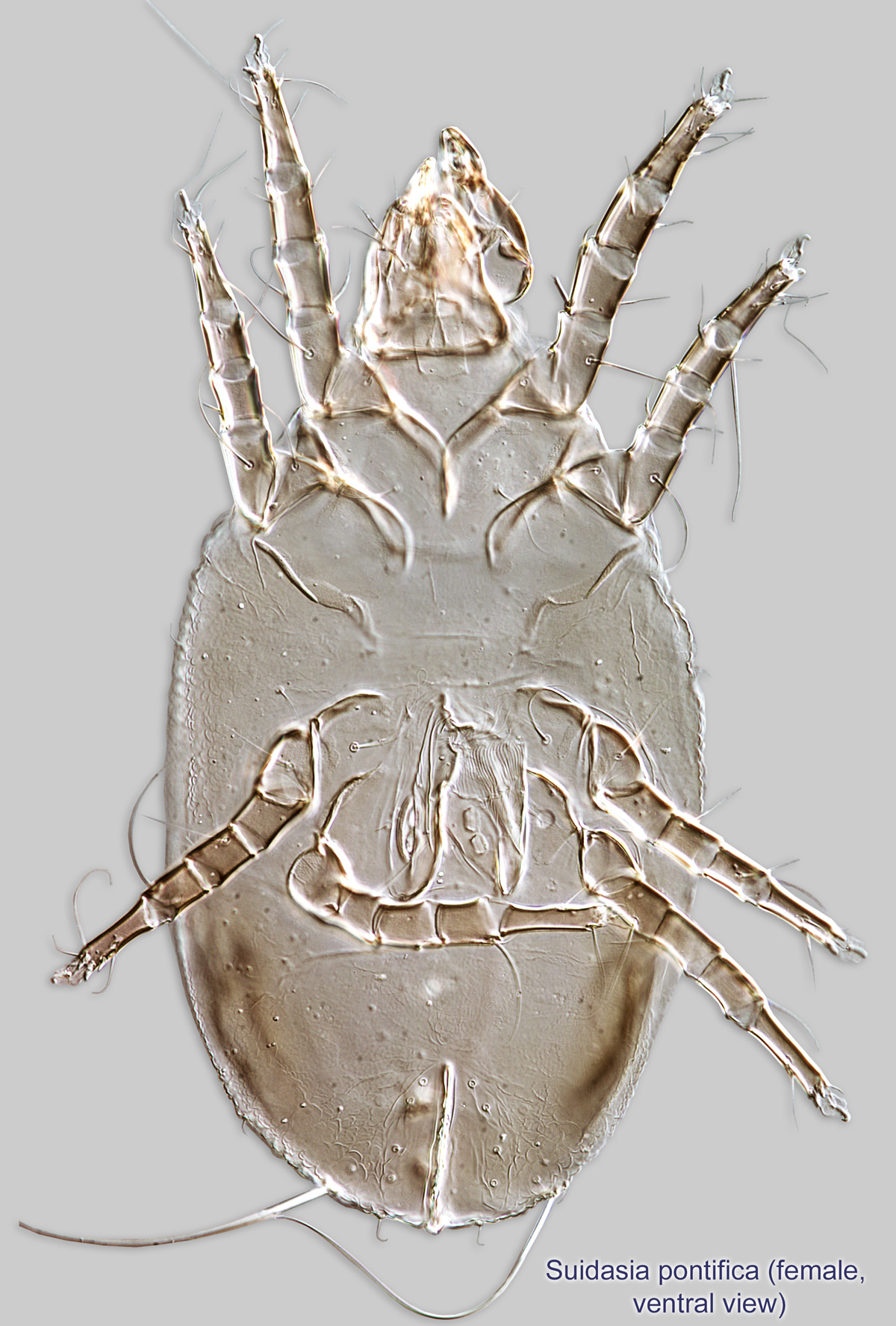
- Suidasia pontifica

Scientific classification
- Kingdom: Animalia
- Phylum: Arthropoda
- Subphylum: Chelicerata
- Class: Arachnida
- Order: Sarcoptiformes
- Family: Suidasiidae
- Genus: Suidasia; Oudemans, 1905

= Suidasia =

Genus of mites

Suidasia is a genus of mites in the family Suidasiidae and clade Astigmatina.

== Description ==
The body of Suidasia mites has various patterns. If small rounded protuberances are present, these are coalescent and at least some are unequal. The dorsal surface is covered in smooth setae. The prodorsum has external vertical setae ve on the sides of the prodorsal sclerite and near the transverse level of setae vi. The supracoxal setae are lanceolate in shape and have fimbriate margins. The hysterosomal setae are short and do not reach the bases of next setae. On the ventral surface of the body, the anus is positioned near the pretarsal margin.

The ventral subcapitulum is without external ridges.

Each leg ends in pretarsi ambulacra that are not greatly expanded, and in empodial claws that are simple. The tarsi have solenidion ω2 and setae e and f, the latter two both being filiform.

== Ecology ==
Suidasia are generalists found in various habitats, such as stored products, house dust and bee nests. They are believed to feed on pollen and decaying organic matter.

Unlike some other Astigmatina, Suidasia do not form phoretic deutonymphs (an immature stage specialized for dispersal via attaching to other animals). They may still disperse phoretically but as feeding stages. Suidasia australiensis has been found attached to hide beetles of genus Trox (Trogidae).

== Medical importance ==
Suidasia pontifica is one of the mite species that can cause oral mite anaphylaxis, also known as pancake syndrome. This syndrome is an allergic reaction caused by eating starchy foods contaminated by mites.

== Taxonomy ==
Suidasia was originally placed in the family Rhizoglyphidae. It was later transferred to Acaridae and then to Suidasiidae. A 2020 analysis using mitochondrial DNA supports the classification of Suidasia in its own family.

== Gallery ==
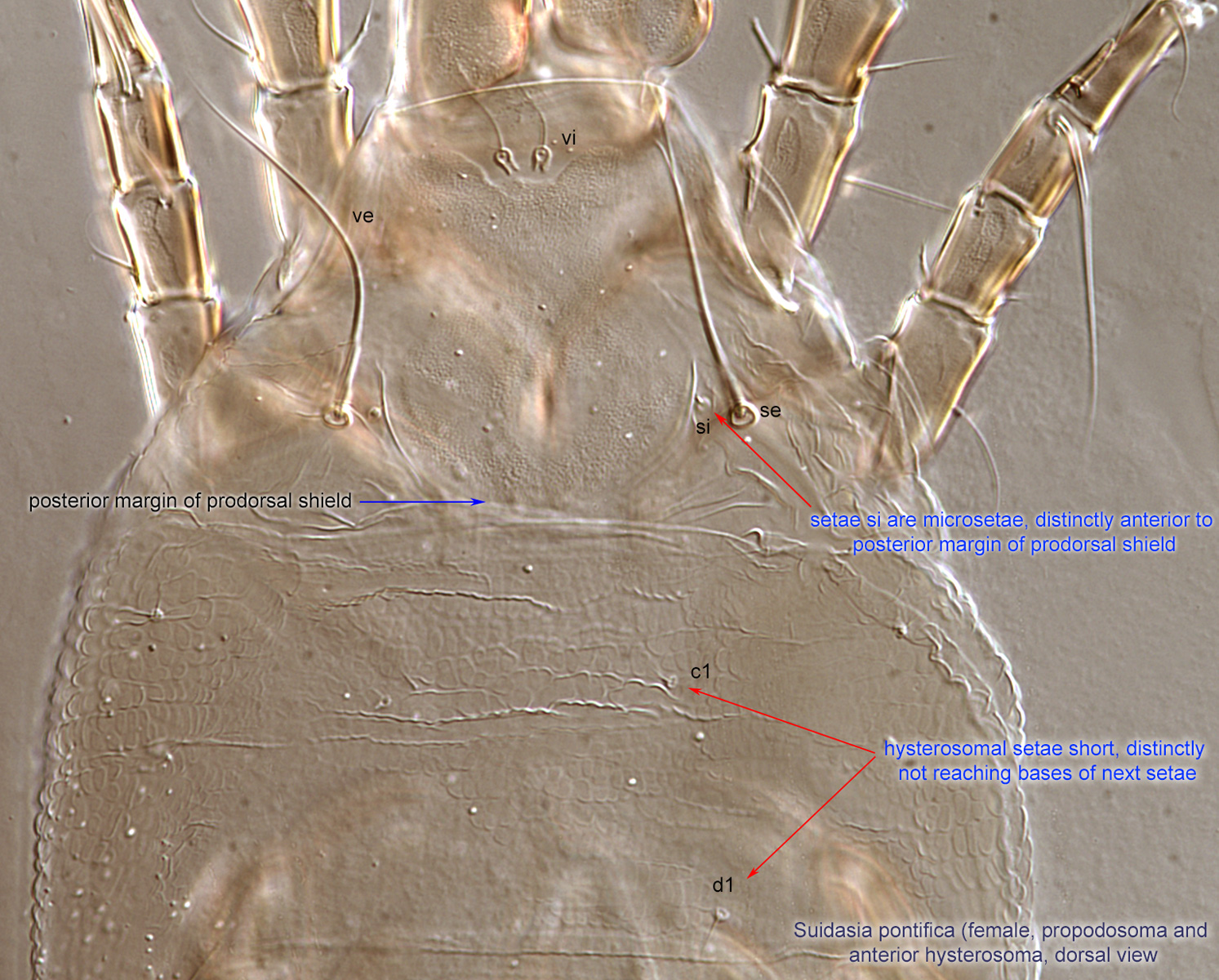
Suidasia pontifica female, dorsal view

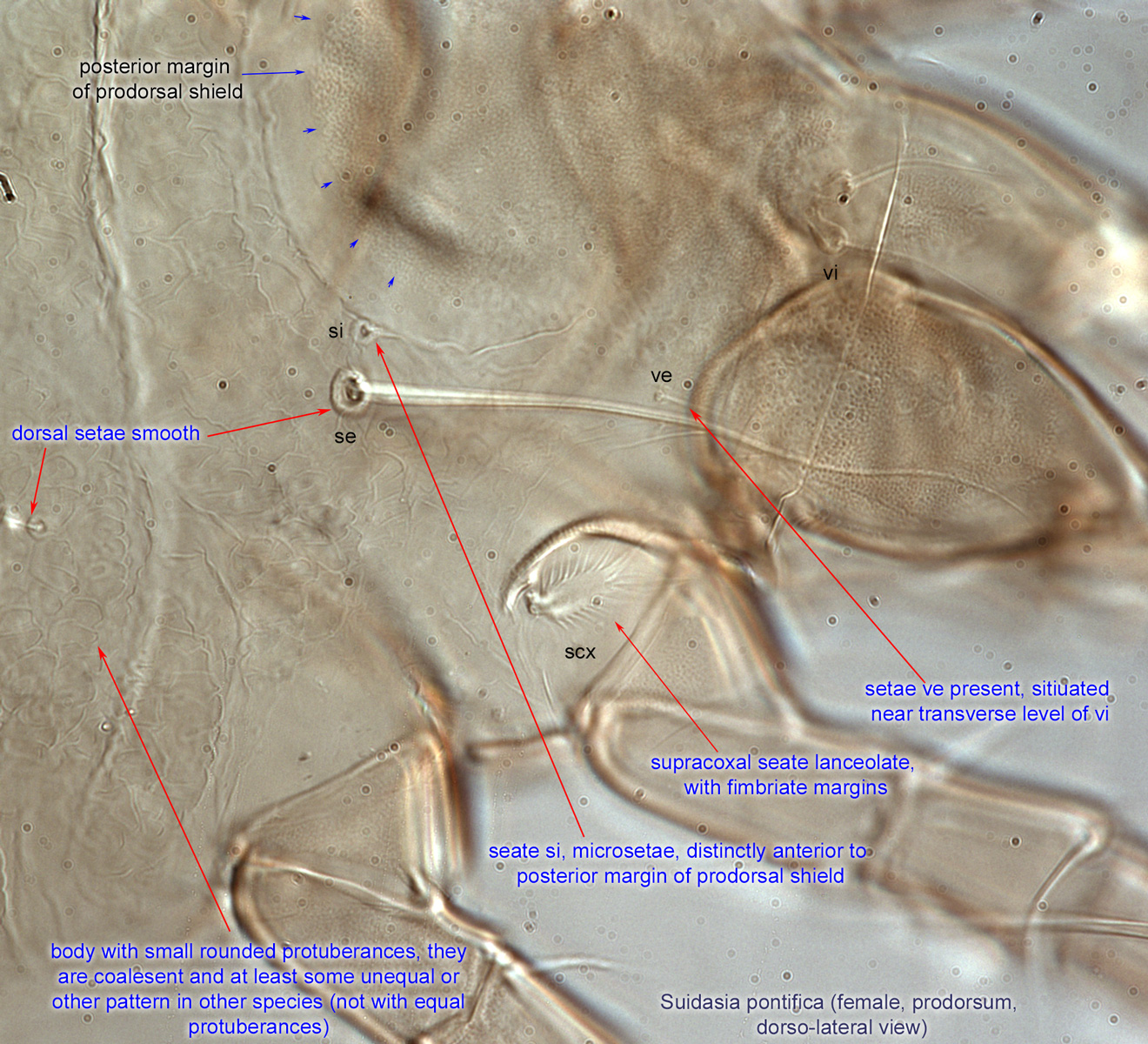
Suidasia pontifica female, prodorsum

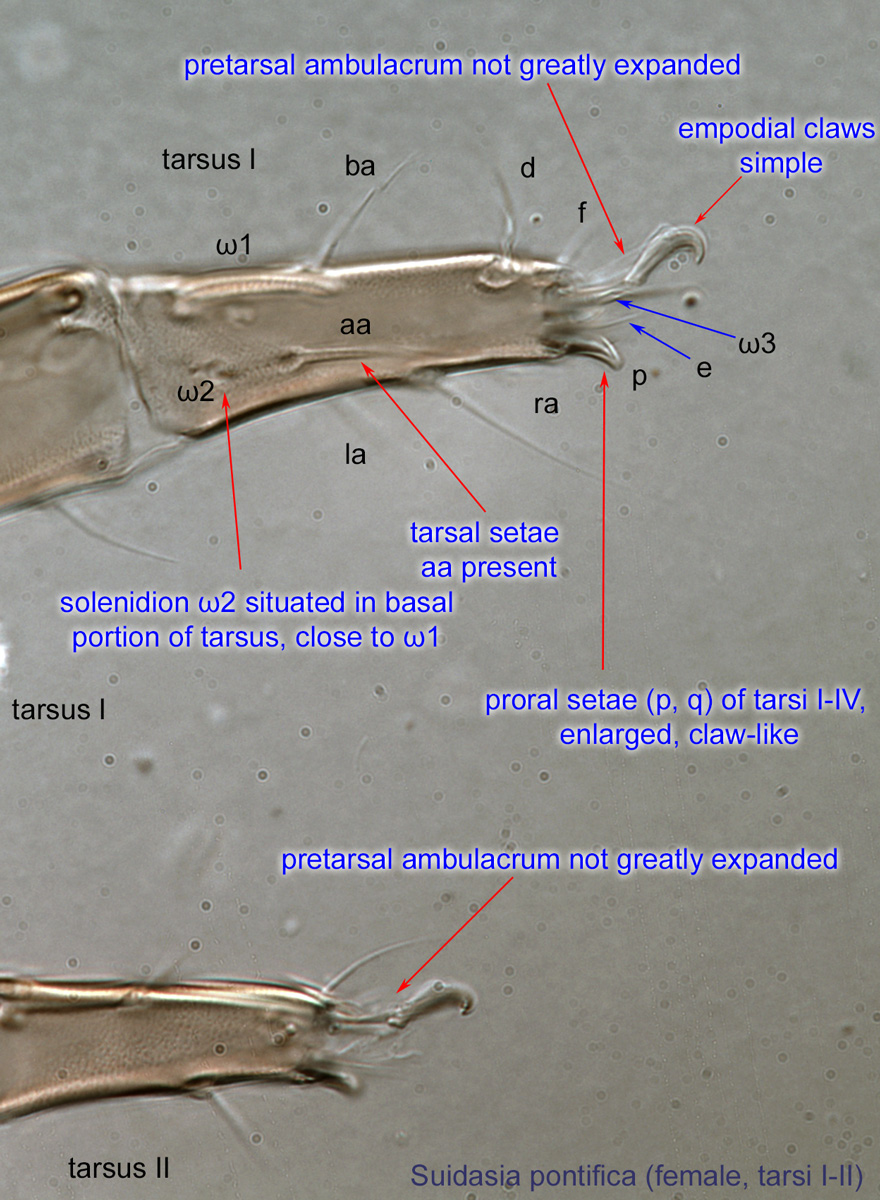
Suidasia pontifica female, tarsi

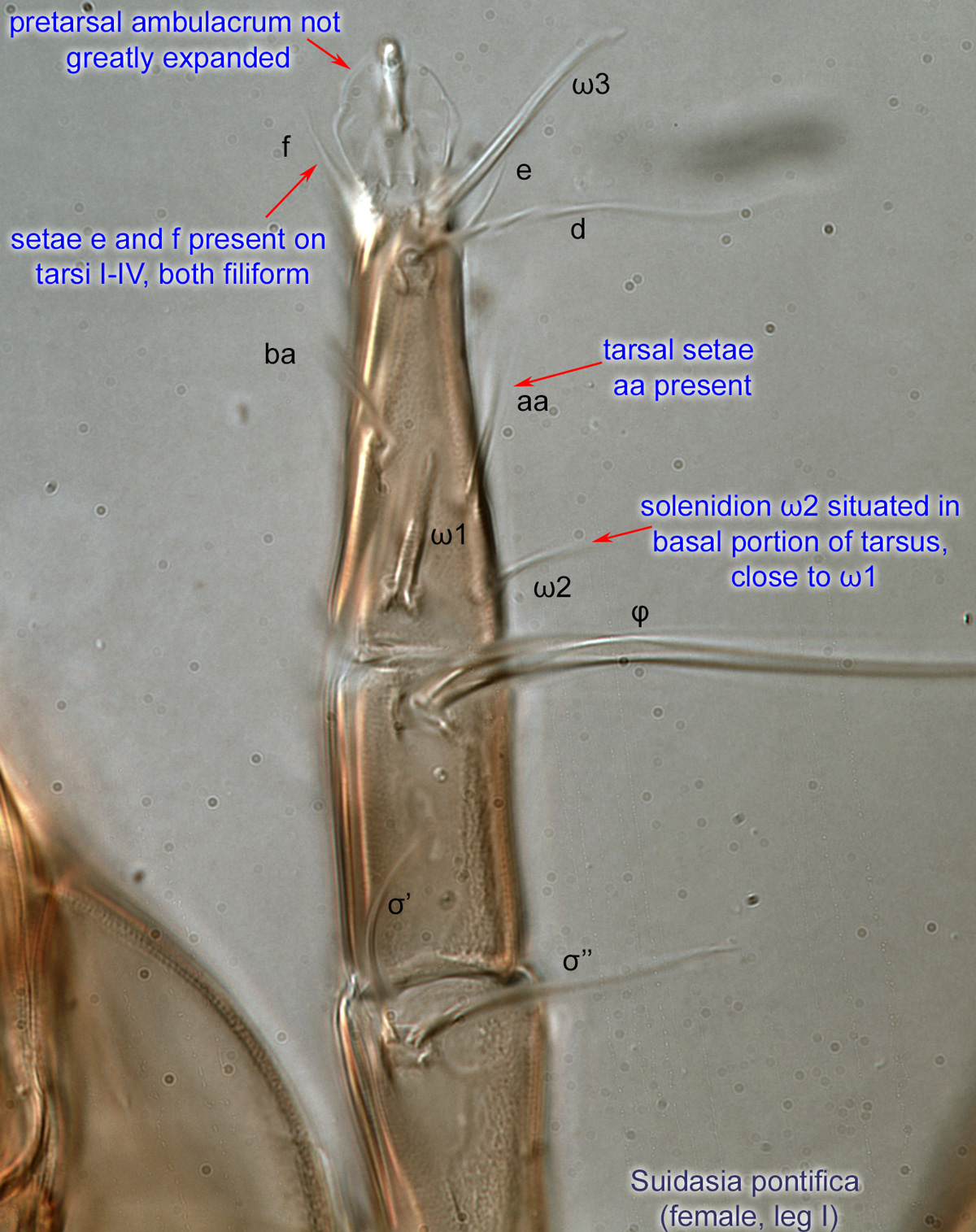
Suidasia pontifica female, leg I

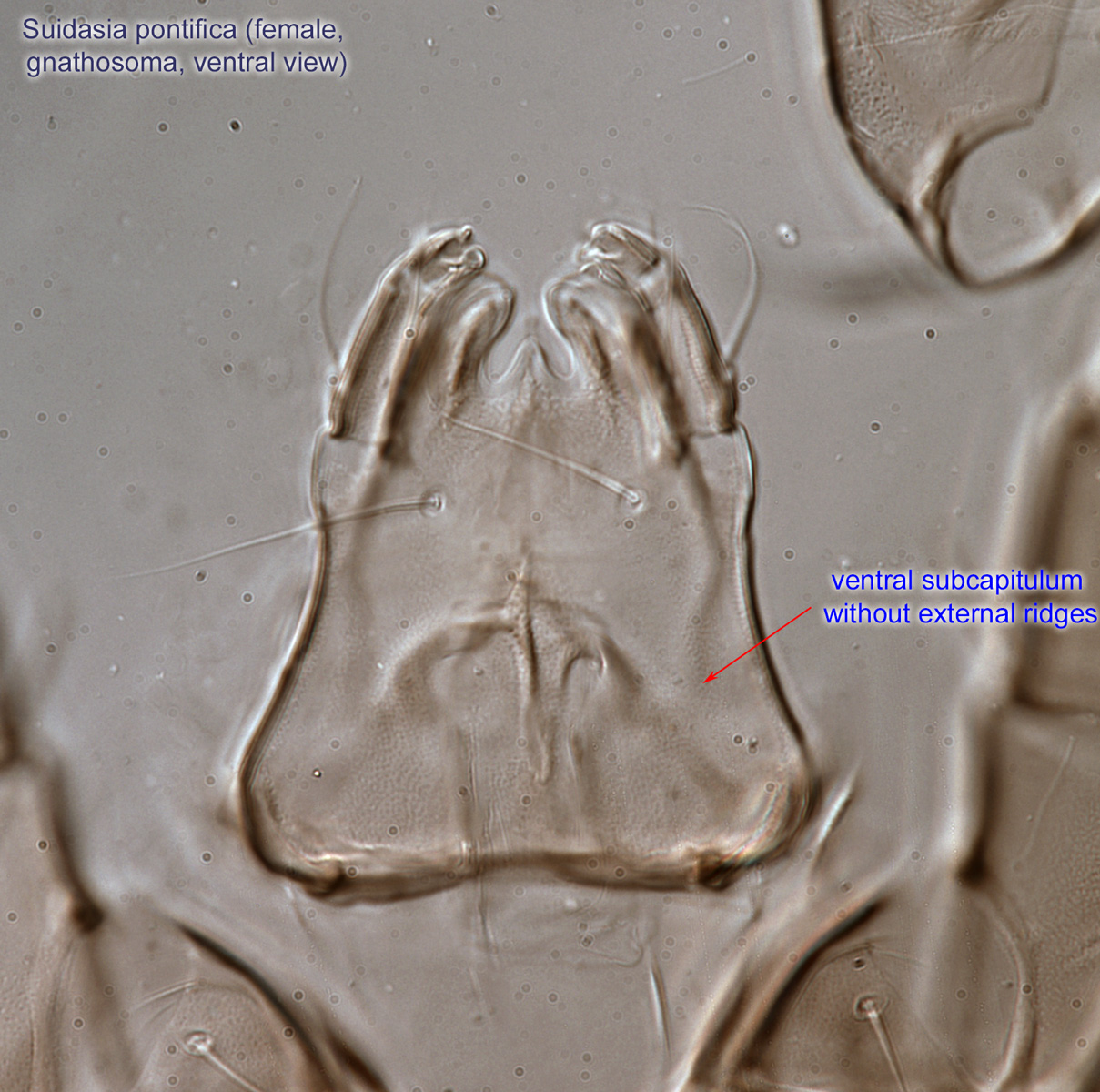
Suidasia pontifica female, gnathosoma

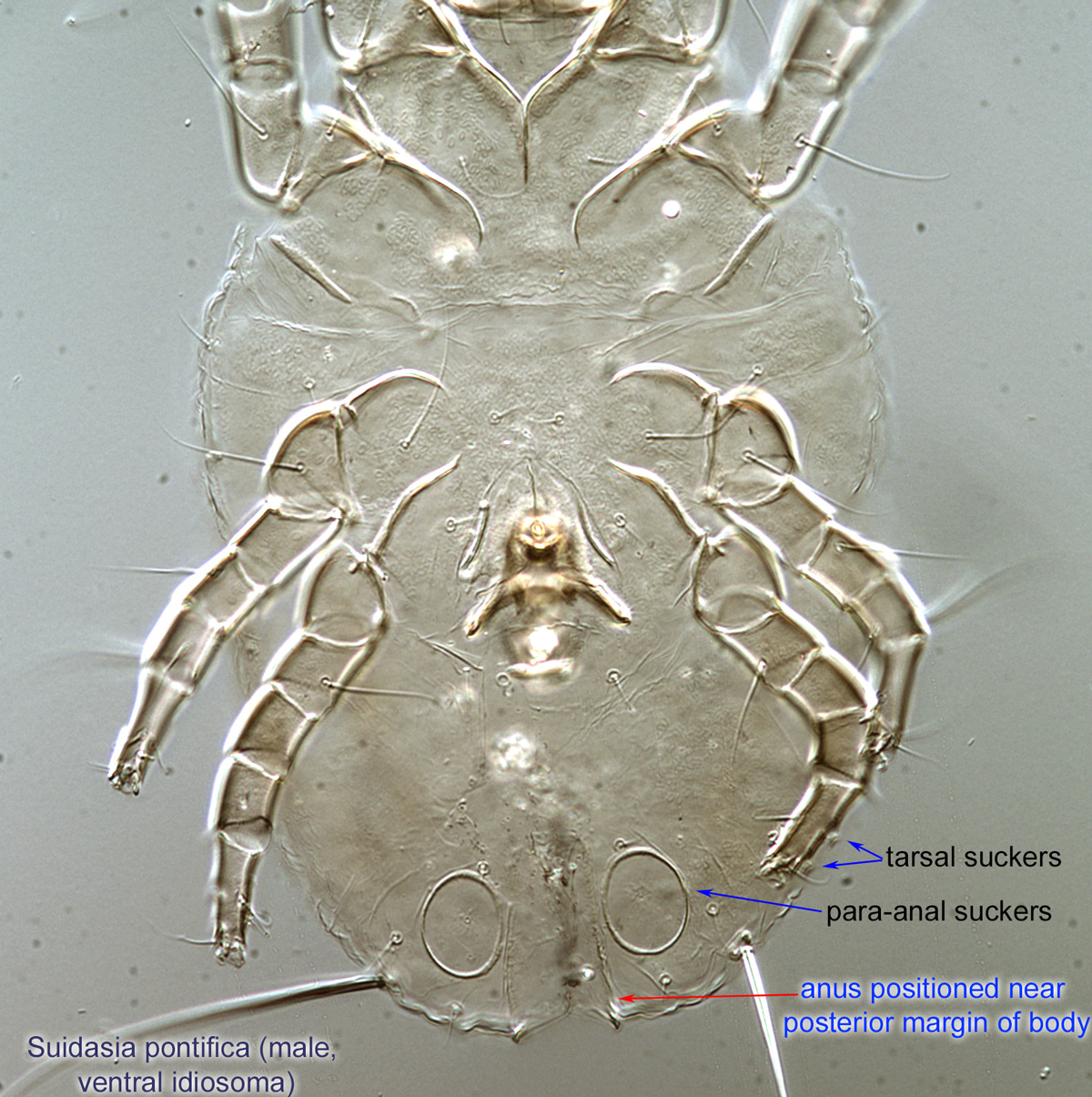
Suidasia pontifica male, ventral view
