= Gnathosoma =

Mouthparts of mites and ticks

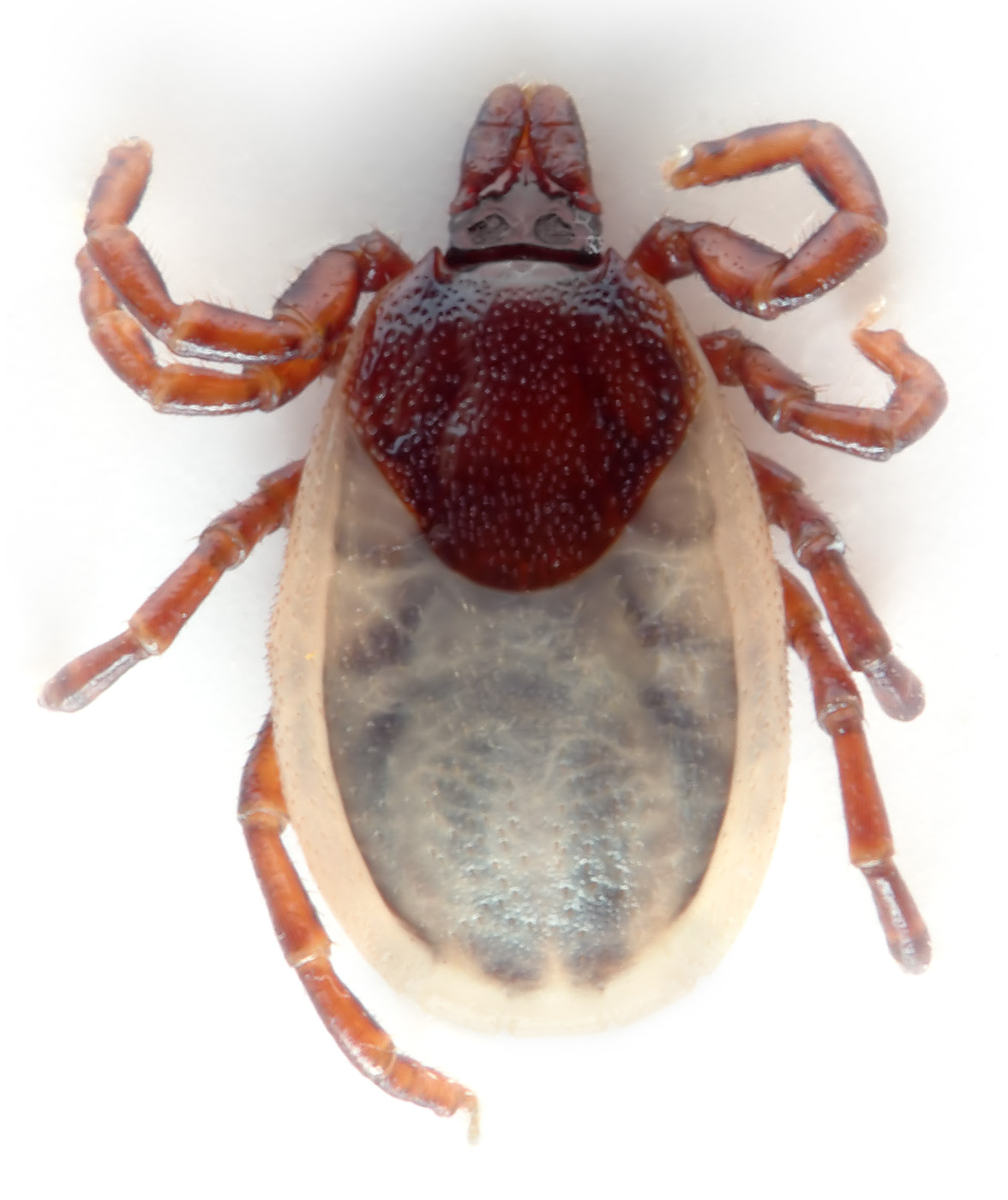
Ixodes hexagonus, a tick.

The gnathosoma (from Greek γνάθος, gnáthos = "jaw" and σώμα, sóma = "body"), also called the capitulum, is the part of the body of the Acari (mites and ticks) comprising the mouth and feeding parts. These are the hypostome, the chelicerae and the pedipalps. It is separated from the main body of the animal (the idiosoma) by a flexible section of the cuticle called the circumcapitular furrow or circumcapitular suture.

== See also ==
- Subcapitulum
