= Evasin =

Family of proteins produced by ticks

Evasin-4

Identifiers
- Organism: Rhipicephalus sanguineus
- Symbol: Eva1
- Orthologs: OMA: entry
- UniProt: P0C8E9
Search for
- Structures: Swiss-model
- Domains: InterPro

Evasins are a family of salivary proteins produced in parasitic ticks which are capable of shutting off the first steps of an immune response brought about by chemokines. These proteins are injected into a tick's host to prevent a painful inflammation that might otherwise alert the host to the tick's presence. As chemokines have been implicated in a number of inflammatory diseases including atherosclerosis, asthma, rheumatoid arthritis, and cancer, chemokine-binding proteins such as evasins are being researched to assess their therapeutic potential as chemokine-targeting antagonists.

The same term is also used to refer to other proteins.

== Tick evasins ==
The brown dog tick evasin-4 binds to CCL5 and CCL11, but appears to neutralize even more chemokines. It has an Ig-fold domain. Other evasins in this organism include Evasin-1 (P0C8E7) and Evasin-3 (P0C8E8).

== Other evasins ==
Evasin is also used to refer to any viral proteins used for the evasion of the immune responses. This usage is rare.

The term is also used to refer to "Endogenous VASopeptidase INhibitors" (Q9PW56), a kind of endogenous brain protein found in snakes.
