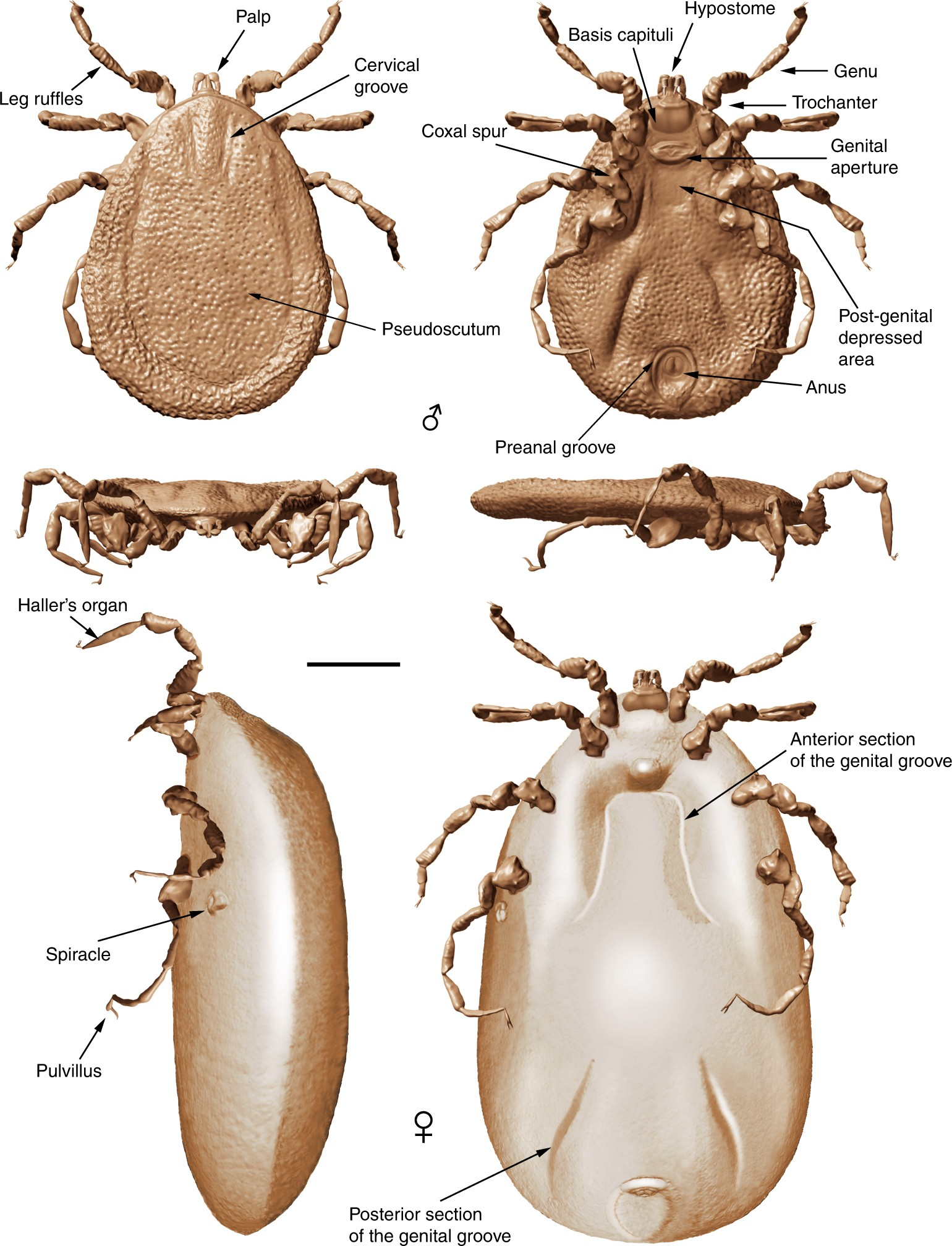
- Views of male (top, mid) and engorged female (bottom) of D. draculi

Scientific classification
- Kingdom: Animalia
- Phylum: Arthropoda
- Subphylum: Chelicerata
- Class: Arachnida
- Order: Ixodida
- Family: Nuttalliellidae
- Genus: †Deinocroton; Peñalver, Arillo, Anderson and Pérez-de la Fuente, 2017

Type species
- Deinocroton draculi

Other species
- Deinocroton draculi Peñalver, Arillo, Anderson and Pérez-de la Fuente, 2017; Deinocroton copia Chitimia-Dobler, Mans and Dunlop, 2022; Deinocroton bicornis Chitimia-Dobler, Dunlop and Mans, 2024; Deinocroton lacrimus Chitimia-Dobler, Dunlop and Mans, 2024

= Deinocroton =

Deinocroton Temporal range: Early Cenomanian 99 Ma

Extinct tick genus

Deinocroton is an extinct genus of tick. It is known from four species found in Burmese amber, dating to the earliest part of the Cenomanian stage of the Late Cretaceous, around 99 million years ago.

== Taxonomy ==
Four species have been named, including the type species D. draculi, D. copia, D. bicornis and D. lacrimus all from Burmese amber, which dates to the late Albian-early Cenomanian stages of the Cretaceous period, around 100 million years ago. The genus is suggested to be more closely related to Nuttalliella than to the two major living families of ticks, which is supported by the anatomy of its leg joints. While originally placed in its own family Deinocrotonidae, a 2024 study suggested that it should be placed into Nuttalliellidae, along with Nuttalliella and the extinct genus Legionaris also known from Burmese amber.

Cladogram after Chitimia‐Dobler et al. 2022 and 2024:

- Ixodida (ticks)
  - Nuttalliellidae
    - Nuttalliella
    - †Deinocroton
    - †Legionaris
  - - †Khimairidae
      †Khimaira
    - Argasidae (soft ticks)
    - Ixodidae (hard ticks)

== Etymology ==
The name of the genus Deinocroton is composed of two words from the ancient Greek "deinos", "terrible", and "krotṓn", "krotṓn", "tick". The name of the species draculi refers to the vampire Count Dracula from the epistolary novel Dracula by British writer Bram Stoker.

== Description ==
Deinocroton is distinguished from other ticks by a suite of characters relating to the structure of its integument, the morphology of the palps, and the preanal groove shape. The surface of the body is densely pitted with deep pits, and eyes are absent.

== Ecology ==
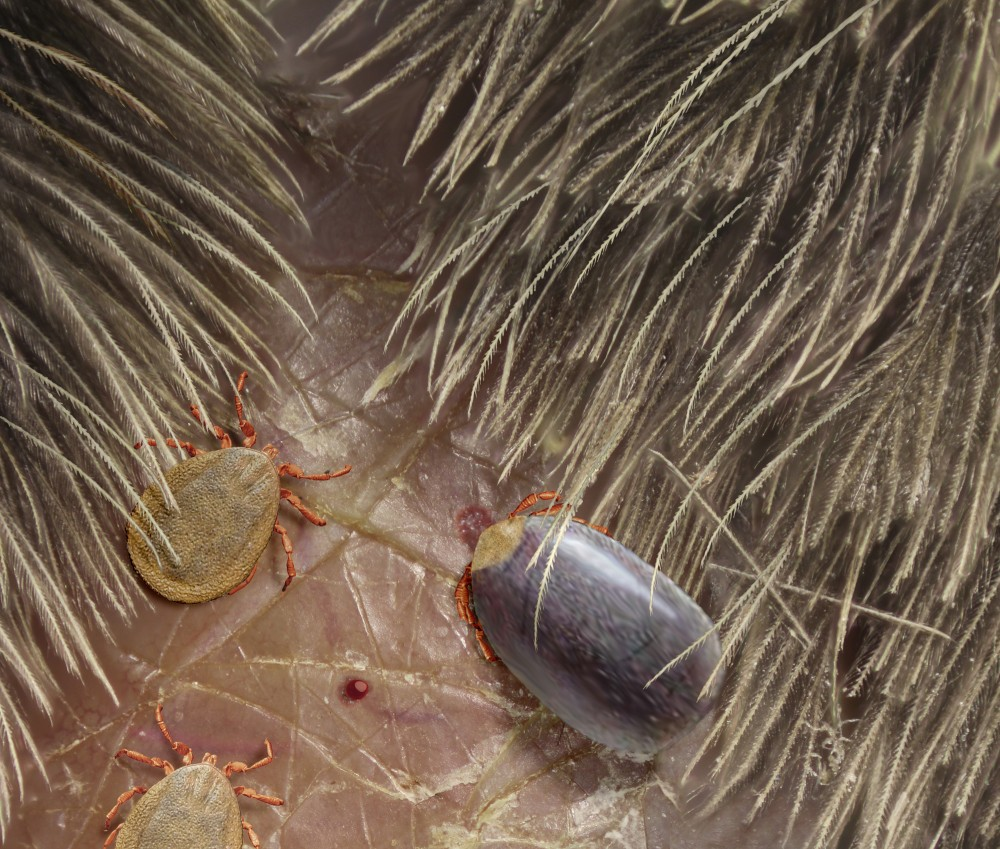
Life restoration

The strongly pitted surface of the body and large volume increase (8.5x) of engorged females suggests that the feeding behaviour was most similar to living soft bodied ticks and Nuttalliella, with a rapid engorgement time (minutes to hours), and multiple gonotrophic cycles. The preferred hosts have been inferred to be feathered dinosaurs, based on the association of known specimens with feathers in amber. The specimens were found associated with hastisetae, specialised hair of dermestid beetle larvae, which suggests that they inhabited nests.
