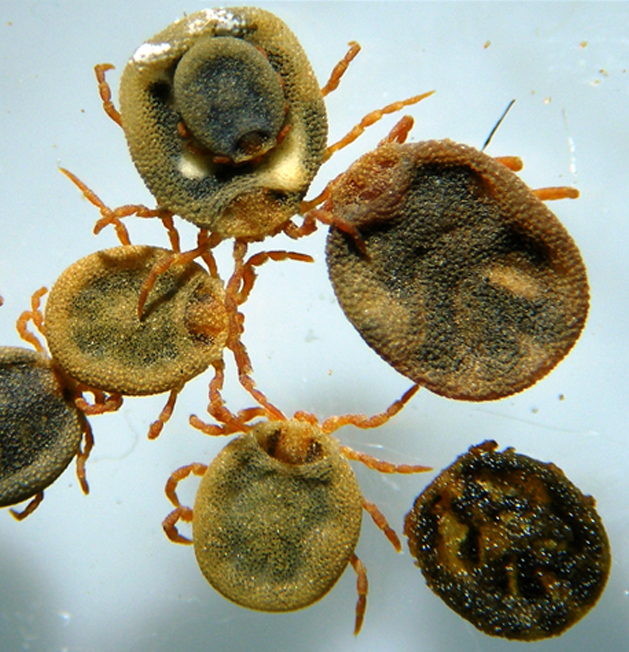

Scientific classification
- Kingdom: Animalia
- Phylum: Arthropoda
- Subphylum: Chelicerata
- Class: Arachnida
- Order: Ixodida
- Family: Nuttalliellidae; Schulze, 1935
- Genus: Nuttalliella; Bedford, 1931

Type species
- Nuttalliella namaqua Bedford, 1931

Fossil species
- Nuttalliella gratae; Nuttalliella tuberculata; Nuttalliella placaventrala; Nuttalliella odyssea; Nuttalliella tropicasylvae

= Nuttalliella =

Nuttalliella Temporal range: Cenomanian–Recent

Genus of ticks

Nuttalliella is genus of tick. It contains a single living species, Nuttalliella namaqua found in southern Africa, having been reported from Tanzania, Namibia and South Africa, with fossil species of the genus having been reported from the mid-Cretaceous (~100 million years ago) Burmese amber of Myanmar. It is the only living member of the family Nuttalliellidae, and the most primitive living lineage of tick. It can be distinguished from ixodid ticks and argasid ticks by a combination of characteristics including the position of the stigmata, lack of setae, strongly corrugated integument, and form of the fenestrated plates.

== History of research ==
The first description by G.A.H. Bedford in 1931 was based upon a single female collected under a stone at Kamieskroon, in Little Namaqualand, by Dr R.F. Lawrence in October 1930. The genus and family honours bacteriologist George Nuttall, a specialist in diseases transmitted by ticks, while the species is named for Little Namaqualand, the origin of the first specimen described. The species was recognised as distinctive enough to warrant its own family in two publications in 1935 and 1936. As of 1980, only eighteen specimens had been collected. In a 2011 study, that number was increased to fifty-one total specimens. They were collected in three locations in South Africa including two new sites: Springbok, Graaff-Reinet, and Heuningvleipan.

Five fossil species of the genus have been described from specimens found in Burmese amber from Myanmar, dating to the mid-Cretaceous (Cenomanian) around 99 million years ago.

== Description and systematics ==
Nuttalliella, and the Nuttalliellidae more broadly, are regarded as the evolutionary 'link' between the hard ticks (Ixodidae) and the soft ticks (Argasidae). Species of Nuttalliella possess a partly sclerotized pseudo-scutum and, albeit short, mouthparts. In adults, the dorsal pseudoscutum appears like that of the Ixodidae, however the cuticle texture is not shell-like as in the hard ticks, rather it is a leathery, wrinkled surface, with elevations and pits as in the Argasidae. N. namaqua larvae possess true scuta, unlike the other life stages of the species; larvae also exhibit a dentate anal plate and pores on the legs, which are not seen in subsequent lifestages or in the Ixodidae or Argasidae. Nuttalliella spp., like the Argasidae, can use their stomach as a storage organ for unmetabolised blood cells and haemoglobin.

The Deinocrotonidae, formerly positioned as a sister family to the Nuttalliellidae, are now considered part of the Nuttalliellidae, as they share many of the unique morphological features of the family. Namely, the shared pseudoscutum and hypostome features, but especially the 'ball-and-socket-like' leg joints common to Nuttalliella, Deinocroton and Legionaris species. As such, there are currently four families in the order Ixodida.

Of modern tick lineages, Nutalliella was historically suggested to be most closely related to the Ixodidae genus Ixodes. This relation was suggested by Bedford in the species' description, who noted the anterior anal groove and character of the pseudoscutum as most similar to Ixodes. However, the nuttalliellids are now considered to be a third primary branch of modern ticks alongside the Ixodidae and Argasidae, with an extinct family Khimairidae more closely related to hard and soft ticks than to Nuttalliellidae.

Cladogram after Chitimia‐Dobler et al. 2022 and 2024:

- Ixodida (ticks)
  - Nuttalliellidae
    - Nuttalliella
    - †Deinocroton
    - †Legionaris
  - - †Khimairidae
      †Khimaira
    - Argasidae (soft ticks)
    - Ixodidae (hard ticks)

Estimates for the age of divergence between the ancestors of Nuttalliellidae including Nuttalliella and the common ancestor of hard and soft ticks ranges from 195 million years ago, during the Early Jurassic, to 270 million years ago, during the Middle Permian.

== Distribution and ecology ==
Nuttalliella namaqua has been observed in southern Africa, including Botswana, Mozambique, Namibia, Tanzania and South Africa, particularly the Karoo. The species' usual habitat is xeric shrubland, often being found in rock crevices or on the ground.

N. namaqua is believed to have generalist host preferences, potentially weighted depending on life-stage The species been collected from mammals, reptiles and birds' nests. Genetic sequencing of blood found in N. namaqua show a wide diversity of lizard hosts. Larvae may feed more commonly on murid rodents, which is common to a number of African ixodid ticks. Nymphs and adults may more readily parasitise lizards, including geckoes, skinks and particularly girdled lizards (Karusasaurus and Cordylus spp.). Resolving the species life-cycle is challenging due to the elusive nature of the tick, in addition to the factor that the females feed rapidly, such that they are rarely found on-host. The species is also known from meerkats, hares and jackals, among others.

Tick host preferences are fundamentally determined by ecological factors, and flexibility in host selection over time is an attribute of most tick lineages. A generalist strategy of parasitism is likely a major driving force in the longevity of the genus.
