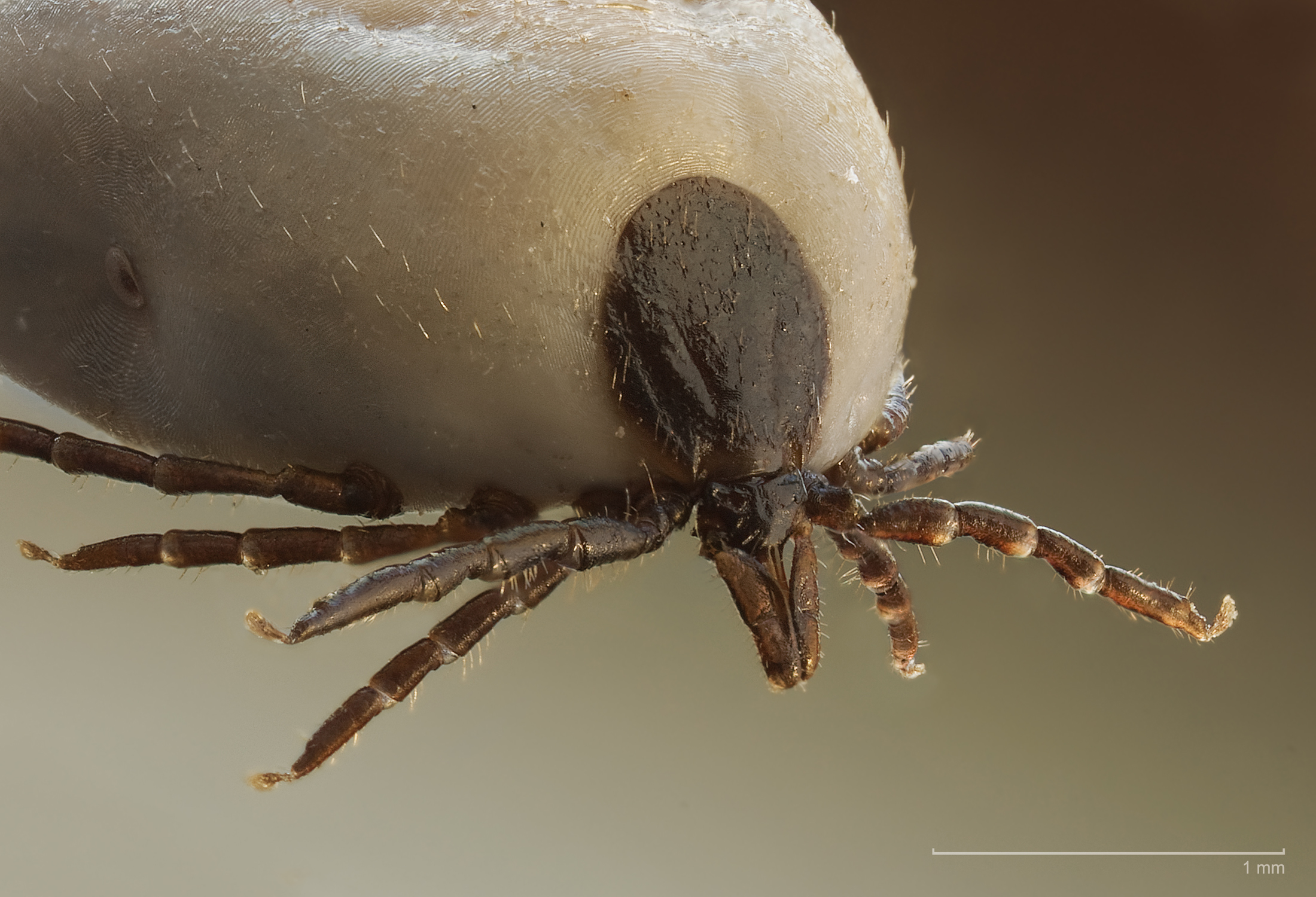
- Ixodes ricinus, a hard tick, engorged

Scientific classification
- Kingdom: Animalia
- Phylum: Arthropoda
- Subphylum: Chelicerata
- Class: Arachnida
- Superorder: Parasitiformes
- Order: Ixodida
- Superfamily: Ixodoidea; Leach, 1815

Families
- Ixodidae – hard ticks; Argasidae – soft ticks; Nuttalliellidae; †Deinocroton; †Legionaris; Nuttalliella; †Khimairidae – monotypic

Diversity
- 37 genera, about 980 species

= Tick =

Tick Temporal range: Albian to present

Order of arachnids in the arthropod phylum

Ticks are parasitic arachnids of the order Ixodida. They are part of the mite superorder Parasitiformes. Adult ticks are approximately 3 to 5 mm in length depending on age, sex, and species, but can become larger when engorged. Ticks are external parasites, living by feeding on the blood of mammals, birds, and sometimes reptiles and amphibians. The timing of the origin of ticks is uncertain, though the oldest known tick fossils are around 100 million years old, and come from the Cretaceous period. Ticks are widely distributed around the world, especially in warm, humid climates.

Ticks belong to two major families: the Ixodidae, or hard ticks, and the Argasidae, or soft ticks. Nuttalliella, a genus of tick from southern Africa, is the only living member of the family Nuttalliellidae, which represents the most primitive living lineage of ticks. Adults have ovoid/pear-shaped bodies (idiosomas) which become engorged with blood when they feed, and eight legs. Their cephalothorax and abdomen are completely fused. In addition to having a hard shield on their dorsal surfaces, known as the scutum, hard ticks have a beak-like structure at the front containing the mouthparts, whereas soft ticks have their mouthparts on the underside of their bodies. Ticks locate potential hosts by sensing odor, body heat, moisture, and/or vibrations in the environment.

Ticks have four stages to their life cycle: egg, larva, nymph, and adult. Ticks belonging to the Ixodidae family undergo either a one-host, two-host, or three-host life cycle. Argasid ticks have up to seven nymphal stages (instars), each one requiring blood ingestion, and as such, Argasid ticks undergo a multihost life cycle. Because of their hematophagous (blood-ingesting) diets, ticks act as vectors of many serious diseases that affect humans and other animals.

== Biology ==
=== Taxonomy and phylogeny ===
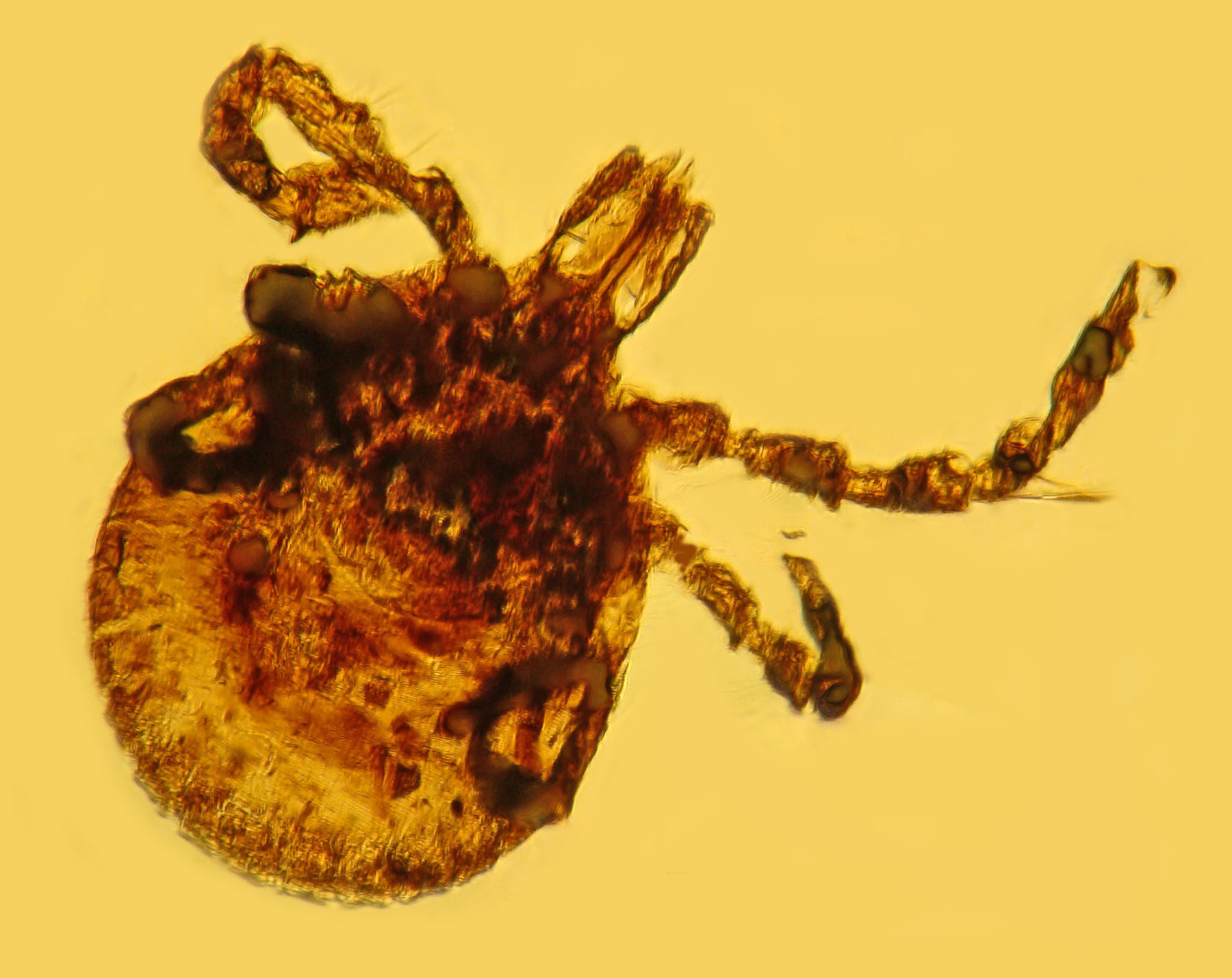
Fossilized tick in Dominican amber

- Parasitiformes
  - Opilioacarida
  - - Mesostigmata
    - - Holothyrida
      - Ixodida (ticks)

Relationships among members of the Parasitiformes, after Klompen, 2010:

- Ixodida
  - Nuttalliellidae
    - Nuttalliella
    - †Deinocroton
    - †Legionaris
  - - †Khimairidae
    - - Ixodidae (hard ticks)
        - Prostriata
        - Metastriata
      - Argasidae (soft ticks)
        - Argasinae
        - Ornithodorinae

Relationships of living and extinct tick families, after Chitimia-Dobler et al. (2022); Chitimia-Dobler et al. (2024).

Ticks belong to the Parasitiformes, a distinctive group of mites that are separate from the main group of mites, the Acariformes. Whether the two groups are more closely related to each other than to other arachnids is uncertain, and studies often resolve them as not closely related. Within the Parasitiformes, ticks are most closely related to the Holothyrida, a small group of free living scavengers with 32 described species confined to the landmasses that formed the supercontinent Gondwana. The phylogeny of the Ixodida within the Acari is shown in the cladogram, based on a 2014 maximum parsimony study of amino acid sequences of 12 mitochondrial proteins. The Argasidae appear monophyletic in this study.

Four families of ticks derive from an ancestral family of all living ticks. The majority of living species belong to the two families Ixodidae (hard ticks) and Argasidae (soft ticks). The third living family is Nuttalliellidae, named for the bacteriologist George Nuttall. It comprises a single extant species, Nuttalliella namaqua, and as such is a monotypic taxon. Nuttalliella namaqua is found in southern Africa ranging from Tanzania to Namibia and South Africa. The fourth is an extinct family, Khimairidae. Its only known species was Khimaira fossus.

Discovery and examination of fossilised ticks have driven understanding of basal Ixodida lineages and the evolutionary history of contemporary taxa. Tick paleobiota have been discovered from the end of the Early Cretaceous onwards, most commonly in amber. The discovery of an argasid bird tick in Late Cretaceous New Jersey amber (Turonian ~94–90 Ma) in 2001 was the first Mesozoic record of Parasitiformes. Burmese amber (Cenomanian ~99 Ma) has produced the oldest fossil records, helping to resolve the Khimairidae and Nuttalliellidae through the discovery of extinct Khimaira, Deinocroton, Legionaris and Nuttalliella species, as well as identifying ancient species of the living ixodid genera Amblyomma, Ixodes, Haemaphysalis, Bothriocroton and Archaeocroton. Tick paleobiota is also known from late Albian amber, (~105 Ma) as well as Baltic (~56–34 Ma) and Dominican amber (~40-20 Ma). A 2019 analysis suggested that the last common ancestor of all living ticks likely lived around 195 million in the Southern Hemisphere, in what was then Gondwana, although another 2018 study put the origin of ticks at closer to ~270 million years ago during the Permian period.

Almost all contemporary taxa fall into one of the two major tick families: the Ixodidae contain 750 species over 18 genera, characterised by a scutum or hard shield, while the Argasidae contain about 220 species over 15 genera. Argasid species have no scutum, and the capitulum (mouth and feeding parts) is concealed beneath the body.

=== Anatomy and physiology ===
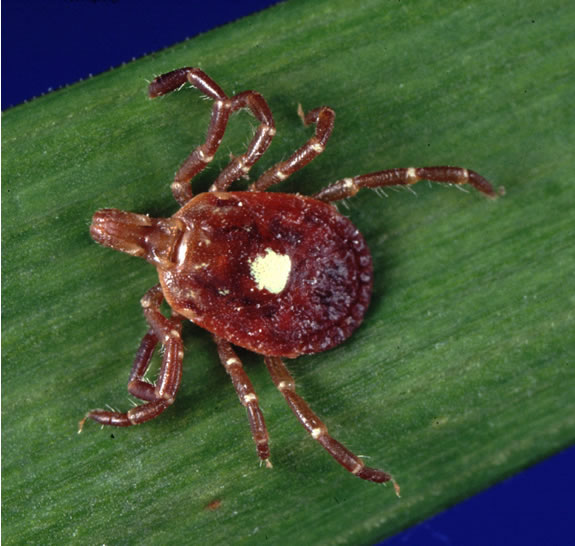
A hard-bodied tick of the family Ixodidae, the lone star tick

Ticks, like mites, belong to the subclass Acari that lack their primary somatic segmentation of the abdomen (or opisthosoma), rather these parasitic arachnids present a subsequent fusion of the abdomen with the cephalothorax (or prosoma). The tagmata typical of other Chelicerata have developed into the gnathosoma (head), which is retractable and contains the mouthparts, and idiosoma (body), which contains the legs, digestive tract, and reproductive organs. The gnathosoma is a feeding structure with mouthparts adapted for piercing skin and sucking blood; it is the front of the head and contains neither the brain nor the eyes. Features of the gnathosoma include two palps, two chelicerae, and hypostome. The hypostome acts as stabilizer and helps to anchor the tick's mouthparts to the host. The chelicerae are specialized appendages used for cutting and piercing into the host's skin while palps are leglike appendages that are sensory in function.

The ventral side of the idiosoma bears sclerites, and the gonopore is located between the fourth pair of legs. In the absence of segmentation, the positioning of the eyes, limbs, and gonopore on the idiosoma provide the only locational guidance.

Larval ticks hatch with six legs, acquiring the other two after a blood meal and molting into the nymph stage. In the nymphal and adult stages, ticks have eight legs, each of which has seven segments and is tipped with a pair of claws. The legs are sometimes ornamented and usually bear sensory or tactile hairs. In addition to being used for locomotion, the tarsus of leg I contains a unique sensory structure, Haller's organ, which can detect odors and chemicals emanating from the host, as well as sensing changes in temperature and air currents. Ticks can also use Haller's organs to perceive infrared light emanating from a host. When stationary, their legs remain tightly folded against the body.

Ticks are extremely resilient animals. They can survive in a near vacuum for as long as half an hour. Their slow metabolism during their dormant periods enables them to go prolonged durations between meals. Even after 18 weeks of starvation, they can endure repeated two-day bouts of dehydration followed by rehydration, but their survivability against dehydration drops rapidly after 36 weeks of starvation. To keep from dehydrating, ticks hide in humid spots on the forest floor or absorb water from subsaturated air by secreting hygroscopic fluid produced by the salivary glands onto the external mouthparts and then reingesting the water-enriched fluid.

Ticks can withstand temperatures just above −18 °C (0 °F) for more than two hours and can survive temperatures between −7 and −2 °C (20 and 29 °F) for at least two weeks. Ticks have even been found in Antarctica, where they feed on penguins.

Most ticks are plain brown or reddish brown. However, the scuta of some species are decorated with white patterns.

==== Ixodidae ====
In nymphs and adults, the capitulum is prominent and projects forwards from the body. The eyes are close to the sides of the scutum and the large spiracles are located just behind the coxae of the fourth pair of legs. The hard protective scutellum, a characteristic of this family, covers nearly the whole dorsal surface in males, but is restricted to a small, shield-like structure behind the capitulum in females and nymphs. When an ixodid attaches to a host the bite is typically painless and generally goes unnoticed. They remain in place until they engorge and are ready to molt; this process may take days or weeks. Some species drop off the host to molt in a safe place, whereas others remain on the same host and only drop off once they are ready to lay their eggs.

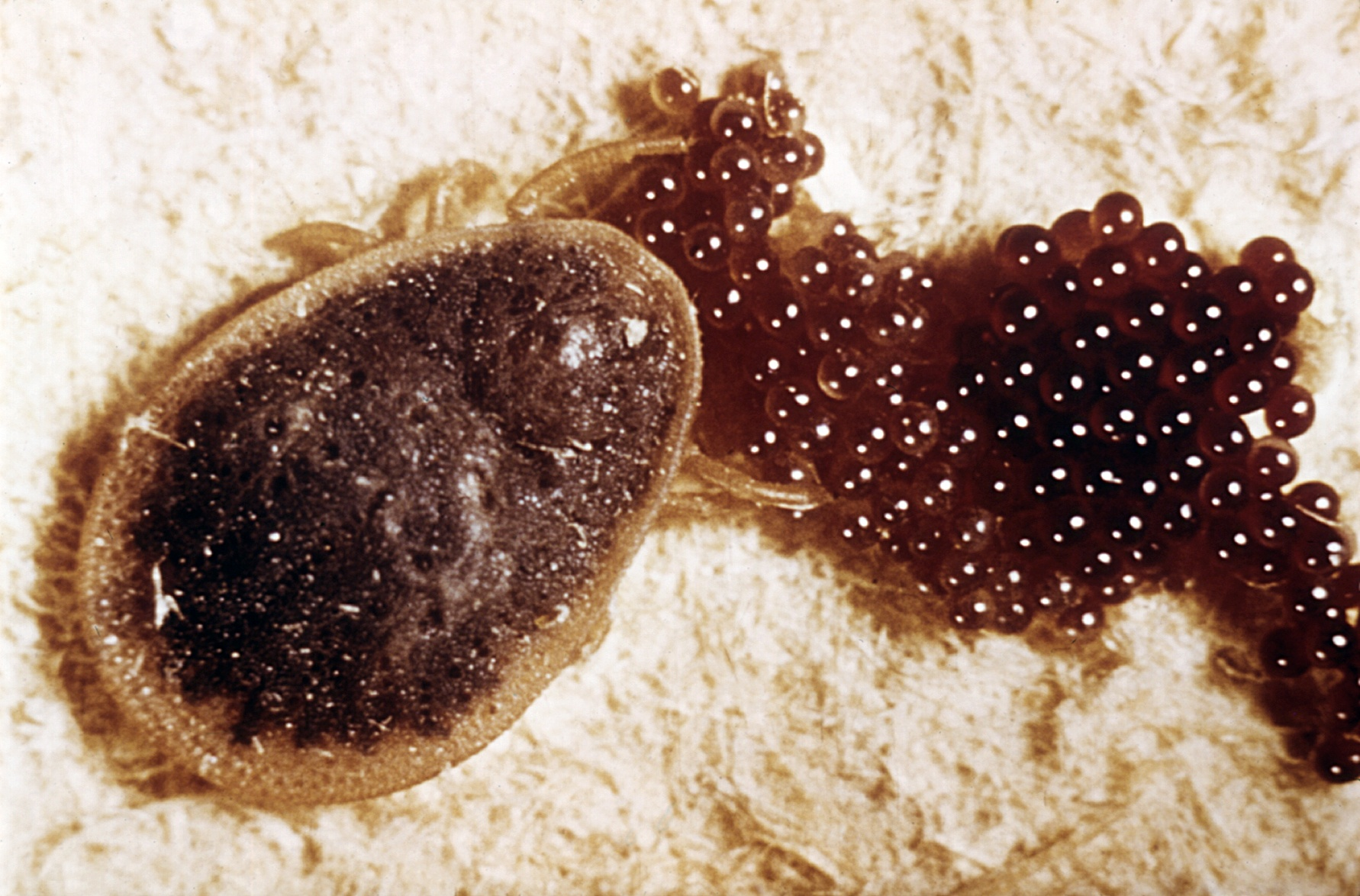
A soft-bodied tick of the family Argasidae, beside eggs it has just laid

==== Argasidae ====
The body of a soft tick is pear-shaped or oval with a rounded anterior portion. The mouthparts cannot be seen from above, as they are on the ventral surface. A centrally positioned dorsal plate with ridges projecting slightly above the surrounding surface, but with no decoration is often present. Soft ticks possess a leathery cuticle as well. A pattern of small, circular depressions expose where muscles are attached to the interior of the integument. The eyes are on the sides of the body, the spiracles open between legs 3 and 4, and males and females only differ in the structure of the genital pore.

==== Nuttalliellidae ====
Nuttalliellidae can be distinguished from both ixodid and argasid ticks by a combination of a projecting gnathosoma and a soft leathery skin. Other distinguishing characteristics include the position of the stigmata, the lack of setae, the strongly corrugated integument, and the form of the fenestrated plates. Nuttalliellidae genera are grouped together with reference to the character of the pseudoscutum and hypostome, but especially the 'ball-and-socket-like' leg joints.

=== Diet and feeding ===
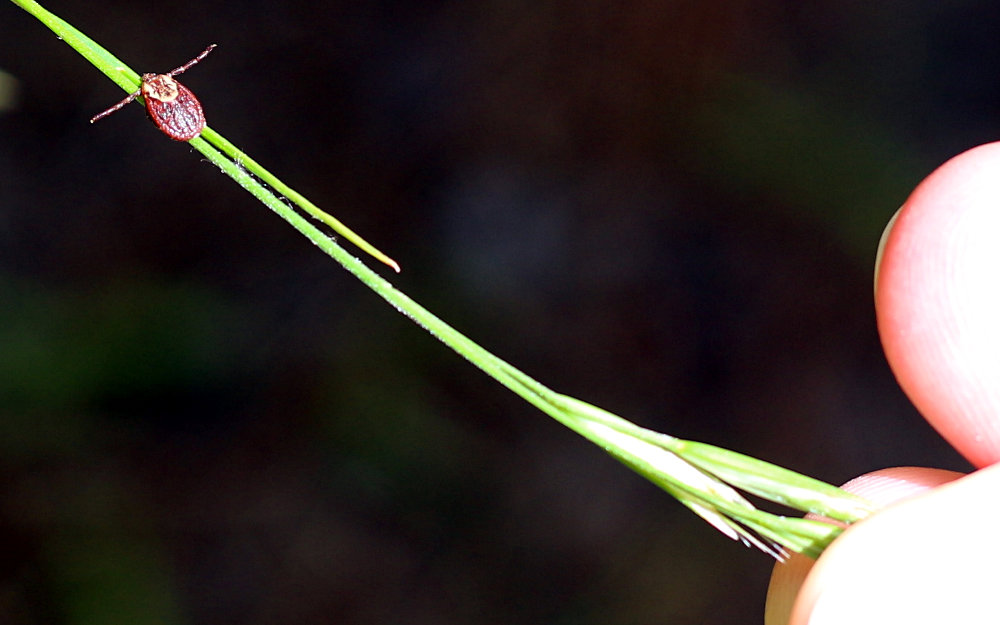
A questing tick, fingers for scale

Ticks are ectoparasites and most species consume blood to satisfy all of their nutritional requirements. They are obligate hematophages, and require blood to survive and move from one stage of life to another. Ticks can fast for long periods of time, but eventually die if unable to find a host. Hematophagy evolved independently at least six times in arthropods living during the late Cretaceous; in ticks it is thought to have evolved 120 million years ago through adaptation to blood-feeding. This behavior evolved independently within the separate tick families as well, with differing host-tick interactions driving the evolutionary change.

Some ticks attach to their host rapidly, while others wander around searching for thinner skin, such as that in the ears of mammals. Depending on the species and life stage, preparing to feed can take from ten minutes to two hours. On locating a suitable feeding spot, the tick grasps the host's skin and cuts into the surface. It extracts blood by cutting a hole in the host's epidermis, into which it inserts its hypostome and prevents the blood from clotting by excreting an anticoagulant or platelet aggregation inhibitor.

Ticks find a host by detecting breath and body odors, body heat, moisture, or vibrations. A common misconception about ticks is they jump onto their host: They are incapable of jumping, although static electricity from their hosts has been shown to be capable of pulling the tick over distances several times their own body length. Many tick species, particularly Ixodidae, lie in wait in a position known as "questing". While questing, ticks cling to leaves and grasses by their third and fourth pairs of legs. They hold the first pair of legs outstretched, waiting to grasp and climb on to any passing host. Tick questing heights tend to be correlated with the size of the desired host; nymphs and small species tend to quest close to the ground, where they may encounter small mammalian or bird hosts; adults climb higher into the vegetation, where larger hosts may be encountered. Some species are hunters and lurk near places where hosts may rest. Upon receiving an olfactory stimulus or other environmental indication, they crawl or run across the intervening surface.

Other ticks, mainly the Argasidae, are nidicolous, finding hosts in their nests, burrows, or caves. They use the same stimuli as non-nidicolous species to identify hosts, with body heat and odors often being the main factors. Many of them feed primarily on birds, though some Ornithodoros species, for example, feed on small mammals. Both groups of soft tick feed rapidly, typically biting painfully and drinking their fill within minutes. Unlike the Ixodidae that have no fixed dwelling place except on the host, they live in sand, in crevices near animal dens or nests, or in human dwellings, where they come out nightly to attack roosting birds or emerge when they detect carbon dioxide in the breath of their hosts. While all species are haematophagous at some point in their lifecycle, a few argasid taxa, such as Antricola delacruzi, only take blood-meals as larvae, subsisting in the nymphal and adult stages by consuming guano.

Ixodidae remain in place until they are completely engorged. Their weight may increase by 200 to 600 times compared to their prefeeding weight. To accommodate this expansion, cell division takes place to facilitate enlargement of the cuticle. In the Argasidae, the tick's cuticle stretches to accommodate the fluid ingested, but does not grow new cells, with the weight of the tick increasing five- to tenfold over the unfed state. The tick then drops off the host and typically remains in the nest or burrow until its host returns to provide its next meal.

Tick saliva contains about 1,500 to 3,000 proteins, depending on the tick species. The proteins with anti-inflammatory properties, called evasins, allow ticks to feed for eight to ten days without being perceived by the host animal. Researchers are studying these evasins with the goal of developing drugs to neutralise the chemokines that cause myocarditis, heart attack, and stroke. The saliva of ticks also contains anticoagulant and antiplatelet proteins (integrin inhibitors), to stop the blood from coagulating while they suck.

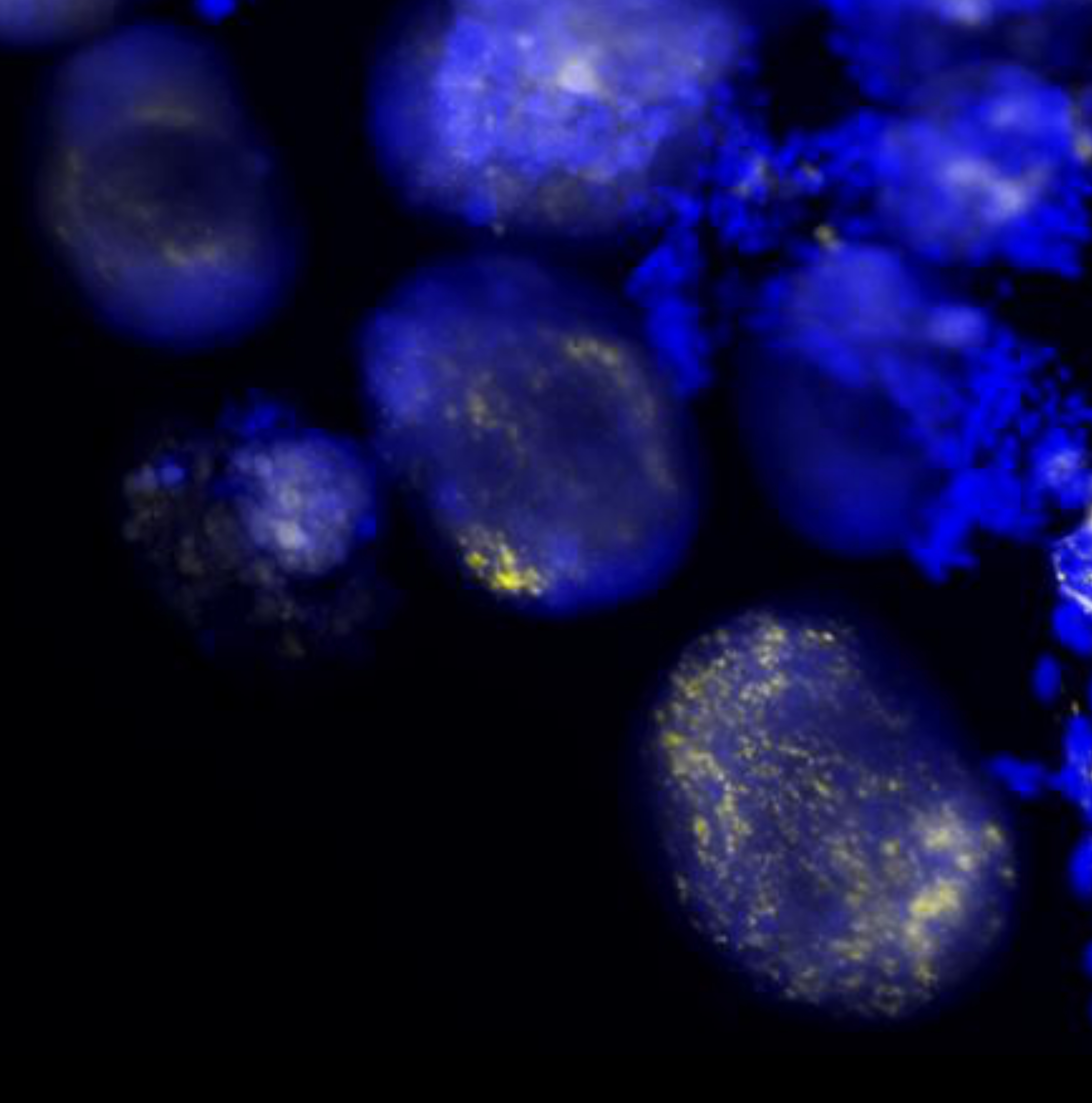
Mature oocysts of the seabird soft tick Ornithodoros maritimus and their Coxiella endosymbionts (labelled in yellow).

Most ticks do not use any other food source than vertebrate blood and therefore ingest high levels of protein, iron and salt, but few carbohydrates, lipids or vitamins. Ticks' genomes have evolved large repertoires of genes related to this nutritional challenge, but they themselves cannot synthesize the essential vitamins that are lacking in blood meal. To overcome these nutritional deficiencies, ticks have evolved obligate interactions with nutritional endosymbionts. The first appearance of ticks and their later diversification were largely conditioned by this nutritional endosymbiosis lasting for millions of years. The most common of these nutritional endosymbionts belong to the Coxiella and Francisella bacterial genera. These intracellular symbiotic microorganisms are specifically associated with ticks and use transovarial transmission to ensure their persistence. Although Coxiella and Francisella endosymbionts are distantly related bacteria, they have converged towards an analogous B vitamin-based nutritional mutualism with ticks. Their experimental elimination typically results in decreased tick survival, molting, fecundity and egg viability, as well as in physical abnormalities, which all are fully restored with an oral supplement of B vitamins. The genome sequencing of Coxiella and Francisella endosymbionts confirmed that they consistently produce three B vitamin types, biotin (vitamin B_{7}), riboflavin (B_{2}) and folate (B_{9}). As they are required for tick life cycle, these obligate endosymbionts are present in all individuals of the tick species they infect, at least at early stages of development since they may be secondarily lost in males during nymphal development. Since Coxiella and Francisella endosymbionts are closely related to pathogens, there is a substantial risk of misidentification between endosymbionts and pathogens, leading to an overestimation of infection risks associated with ticks.

=== Range and habitat ===
Tick species are widely distributed around the world. They tend to flourish more in warm, humid climates, because they require a certain amount of moisture in the air to undergo metamorphosis, and low temperatures inhibit their development of eggs to larvae. The occurrence of ticks and tick-borne illnesses in humans is increasing. Tick populations are spreading into new areas, due in part to the warming temperatures of climate change.

Tick parasitism is widely distributed among host taxa, including marsupial and placental mammals, birds, reptiles (snakes, iguanas, and lizards), and amphibians. Ticks of domestic animals cause considerable harm to livestock through pathogenic transmission, causing anemia through blood loss, and damaging wool and hides. The Tropical Bont tick wreaks havoc on livestock and wildlife in Africa, the Caribbean, and several other countries through the spread of disease, specifically heartwater disease. The spinose ear tick has a worldwide distribution, the young feed inside the ears of cattle and various wildlife.

A habitat preferred by ticks is the interface where a lawn meets the forest, or more generally, the ecotone, which is unmaintained transitional edge habitat between woodlands and open areas. Therefore, one tick management strategy is to remove leaf litter, brush, and weeds at the edge of the woods. Ticks like shady, moist leaf litter with an overstory of trees or shrubs and, in the spring, they deposit their eggs into such places allowing larvae to emerge in the fall and crawl into low-lying vegetation. The 3 meter boundary closest to the lawn's edge are a tick migration zone, where 82% of tick nymphs in lawns are found.

=== Predators ===
Ticks are commonly eaten by a variety of birds, mammals, spiders, amphibians and reptiles. Raccoons, rodents, and opossums may eat ticks they find while grooming.

=== Ecology ===
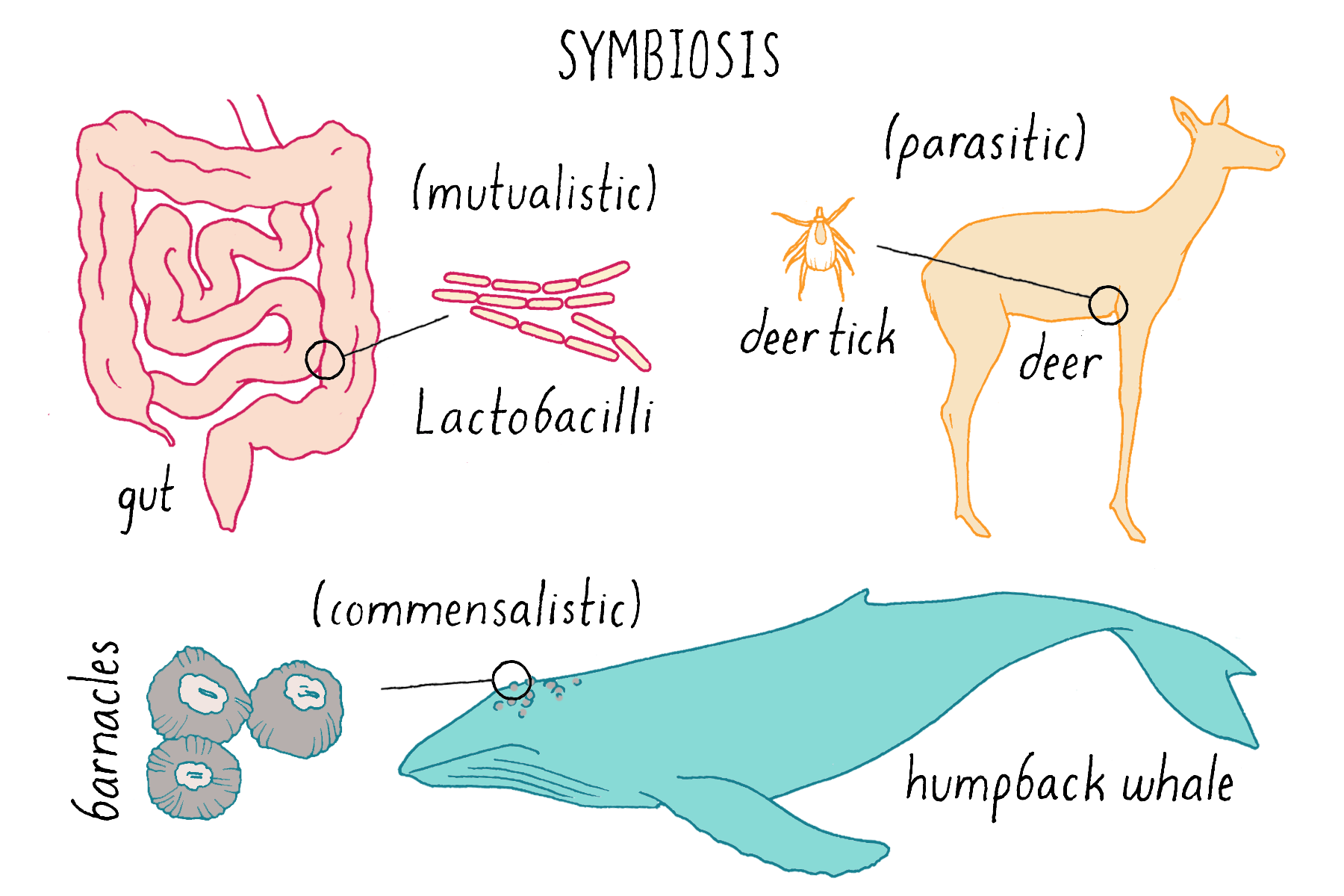
A parasitic form of symbiosis does harm to one organism while benefitting the other, such as with ticks and deer.

In general, ticks are found wherever their host species occur. Migrating birds carry ticks with them on through their migrations; a study of migratory birds passing through Egypt discovered more than half the bird species examined were carrying ticks. It was also observed the tick species varied depending on the season of migration, in this study it is spring and autumn migrations, this is thought to occur due to the seasonal periodicities of the different species.

For an ecosystem to support ticks, it must satisfy two requirements; the population density of host species in the area must be great enough and it must be humid enough for ticks to remain hydrated. Due to their role in transmitting Lyme disease, Ixodid ticks, particularly the North American I. scapularis, have been studied using geographic information systems to develop predictive models for ideal tick habitats. According to these studies, certain features of a given microclimate – such as sandy soil, hardwood trees, rivers, and the presence of deer – were determined to be good predictors of dense tick populations.

Mites and nematodes feed on ticks, which are also a minor nutritional resource for birds. More importantly, ticks act as a disease vector and behave as the primary hosts of many different pathogens such as spirochaetes. Ticks carry various debilitating diseases therefore, ticks may assist in controlling animal populations and preventing overgrazing.

Ticks can transmit an array of infectious diseases that affect humans and other animals. Ticks that carry zoonotic pathogens often tend to have a wide host range. The infective agents can be present not only in the adult tick, but also in the eggs produced plentifully by the females. Many tick species have extended their ranges as a result of the movements of people, domesticated pets, and livestock. With increasing participation in outdoor activities such as wilderness hikes, more people and their dogs may find themselves exposed to ticks.

=== Life cycle ===
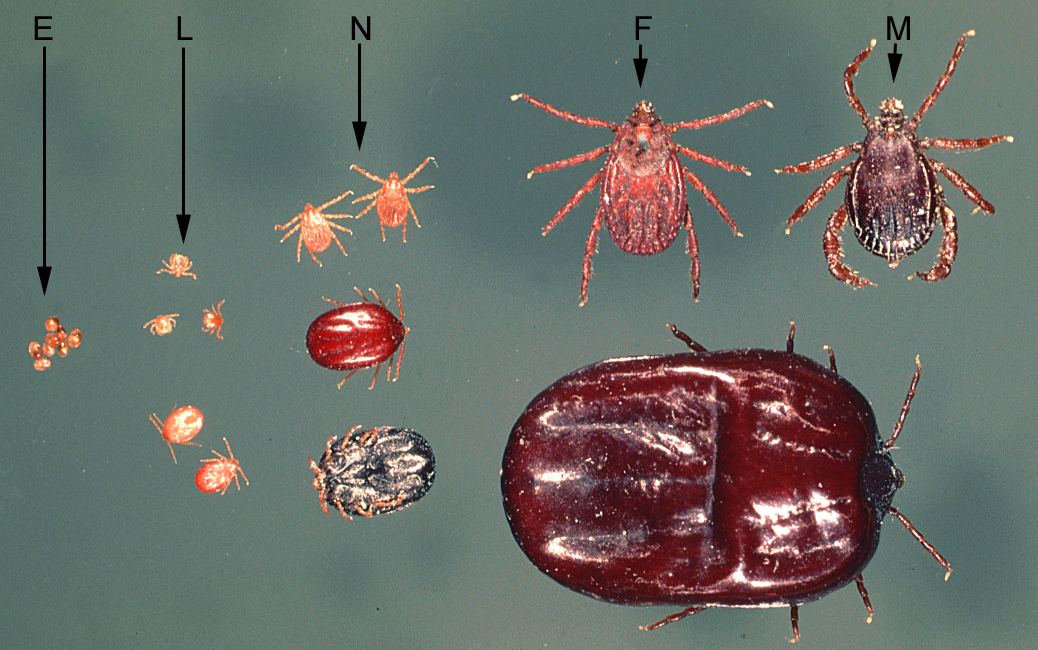
Life-cycle of an ixodid tick (Rhipicephalus appendiculatus, all to same scale); E=eggs, L=larvae, N=nymphs, F=adult female, M=adult male; upper row are unfed ticks, lower row are fully engorged larvae, nymphs, and a female.

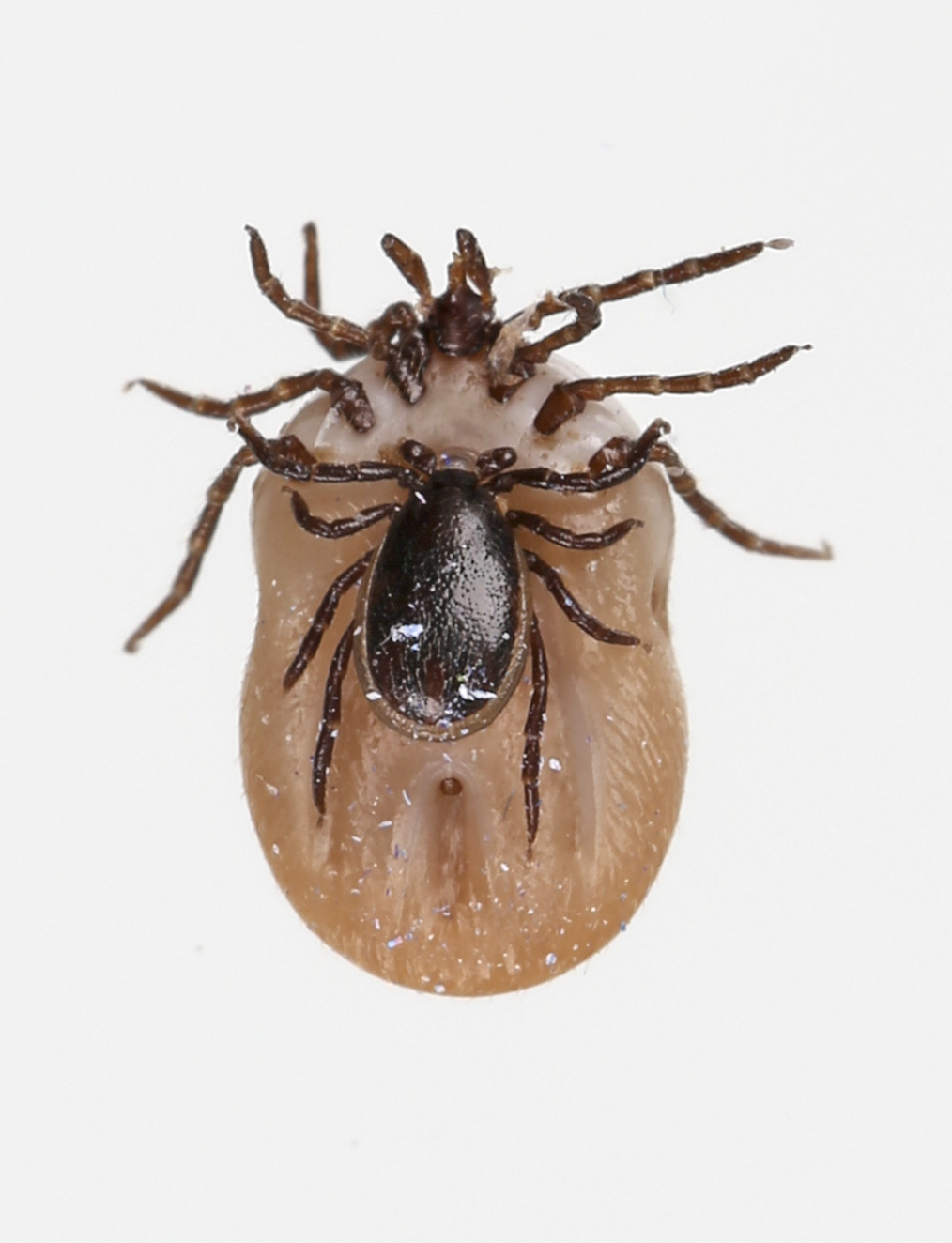
Two ticks mating. The smaller tick is the adult male. The larger is the adult female, who is engorged after feeding.

All three tick families ticks have four life cycle stages: egg, larva, nymph, and adult.

==== Ixodidae ====
Ixodidae ticks have three different life cycles. Depending on the species, Ixodids can either possess a one-host life cycle, two-host life cycle, or three-host life cycle.

===== One-host ticks =====
In one-host ticks the tick remains on the host through the larval, nymphal, and adult stages, only to leave the host to lay eggs. Eggs laid in the environment hatch into larvae, which immediately seek out a host in which to attach and feed. Fed larvae molt into unfed nymphs that remain on the host. After engorging on the host's blood, the nymphs molt into sexually mature adults that remain on the host in order to feed and mate. Once a female is both fed and ready to lay eggs, only then does she leave the host in search of a suitable area to deposit her eggs. Ticks that follow this life cycle are called one-host ticks. The winter tick Dermacentor albipictus and the cattle tick Rhipicephalus microplus are examples of one-host ticks.

===== Two-host ticks =====
The life cycle of a two-host tick often spans two years. During fall the pregnant female tick will drop off her second host and lay her eggs. The eggs hatch during winter, the following spring the larvae emerge and attach to their first host. Newly hatched larvae attach to a host in order to obtain a blood meal. They remain on the host then develop into nymphs. Once engorged, they drop off the host and find a safe area in the natural environment in which to molt into adults, this typically occurs during the winter. Both male and female adults seek out a host on which to attach, which may be the same body that served as host during their early development but is often a larger mammal. Once attached, they feed and mate. Gravid females drop from the host to oviposit in the environment. Ticks that complete their life cycle in this manner, such as Hyalomma anatolicum excavatum, are called two-host ticks.

===== Three-host ticks =====
Most ixodid ticks require three hosts, and their life cycles typically span three years. The female tick drops off its host, often in the fall, and lays thousands of eggs. The larvae hatch in the winter and emerge in the spring. When the larvae emerge, they attach and feed primarily on small mammals and birds. During the summer the larvae become engorged and drop off the first host to molt and become nymphs, this often occurs during the fall. The following spring the nymphs emerge and seek out another host, often a small rodent. The nymphs become engorged and drop off the host in the fall to molt and become adults. The following spring the adult ticks emerge and seek out a larger host, often a large mammal such as cattle or even humans. Females will mate on their third host. Female adults then engorge on blood and prepare to drop off to lay her eggs on the ground, while males feed very little and remain on the host in order to continue mating with other females.

==== Argasidae ====
Argasid ticks, unlike ixodid ticks, may go through up to seven nymphal stages (instars), requiring a meal of blood each time. Often, egg laying and mating occurs detached from the host in a safe environment. The eggs hatch and the larvae feed on a nearby host for anywhere from a few hours to several days, this depends on the species of tick. After they feed the larvae drop and molt into their first nymphal instars, then the nymph seeks out and feeds on its second host, often this is the same as the first host, within an hour. This process occurs repeatedly and until the last nymphal instar occurs, thus allowing the tick to molt into an adult. Once an adult these ticks feed rapidly and periodically their entire life cycle. In some species an adult female may lay eggs after each feeding. Their life cycles range from months to years. The adult female argasid tick can lay a few hundred to over a thousand eggs over the course of her lifetime. Both male and female adults feed on blood, and they mate off the host. During feeding, any excess fluid is excreted by the coxal glands, a process that is unique to argasid ticks.

==== Nuttalliellidae ====
Nuttalliellidae is an elusive monotypic family of tick, that is, possesses a single species, Nuttalliella namaqua. There is little to nothing known about the life cycle and feeding habits of N. namaqua but it is speculated this species of tick has multiple different hosts.

== Relationship with humans ==
=== Tick-borne disease ===
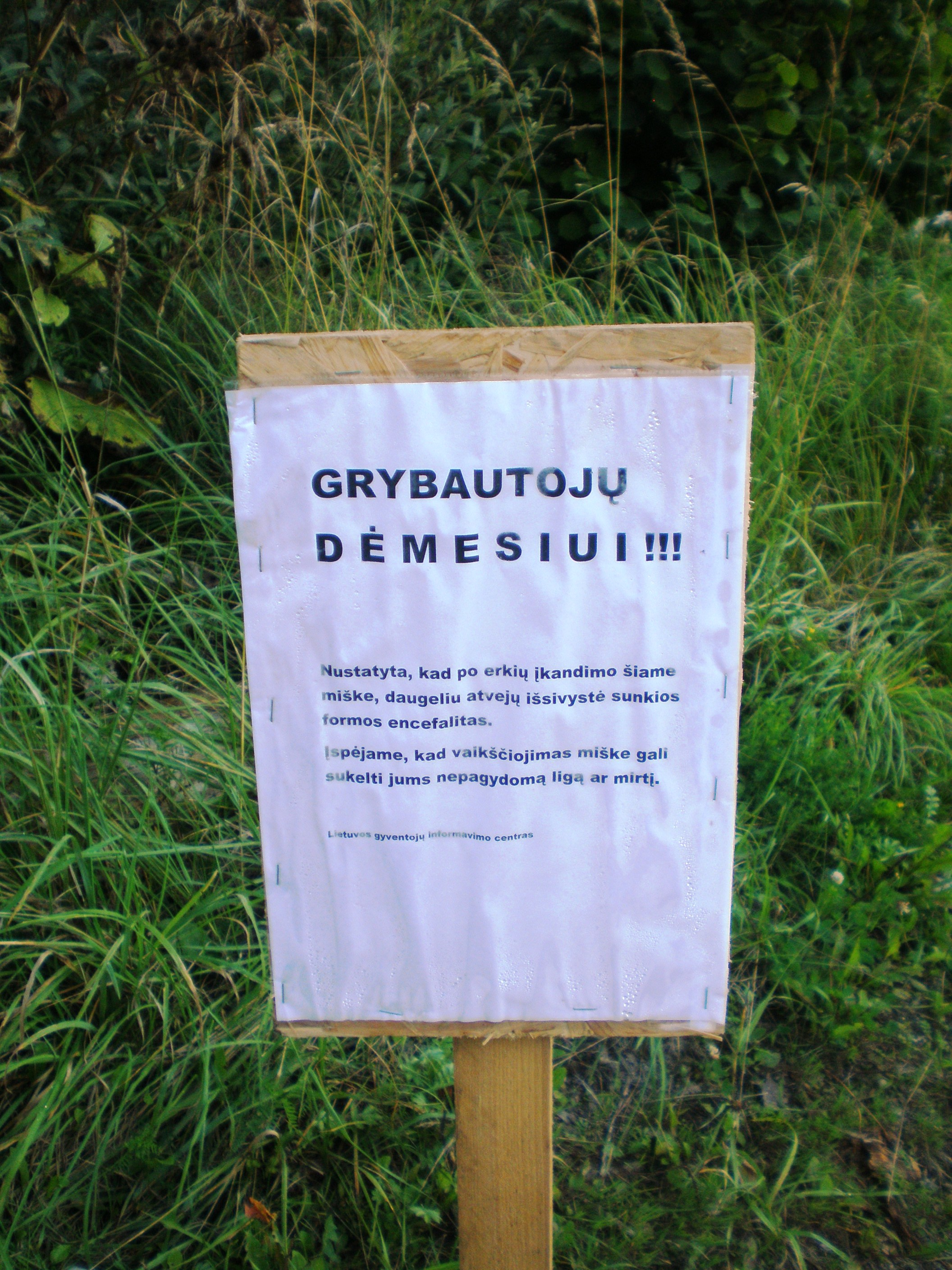
A sign in a Lithuanian forest warning of high risk of tick-borne encephalitis infection

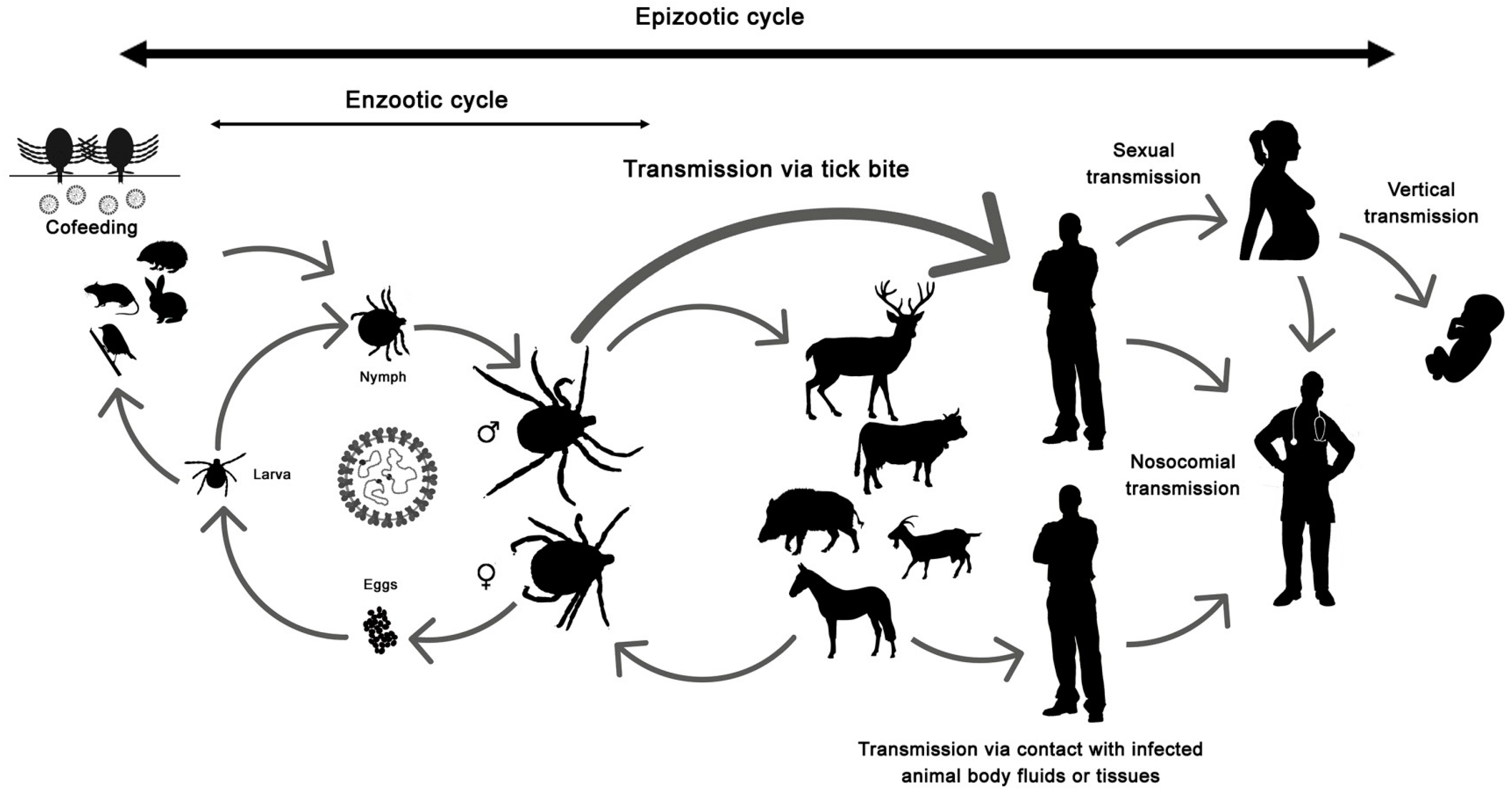
Crimean-Congo hemorrhagic fever virus (CCHFV) cycle and its routes of transmission. CCHF is the most widely distributed tick-borne viral disease in the world.

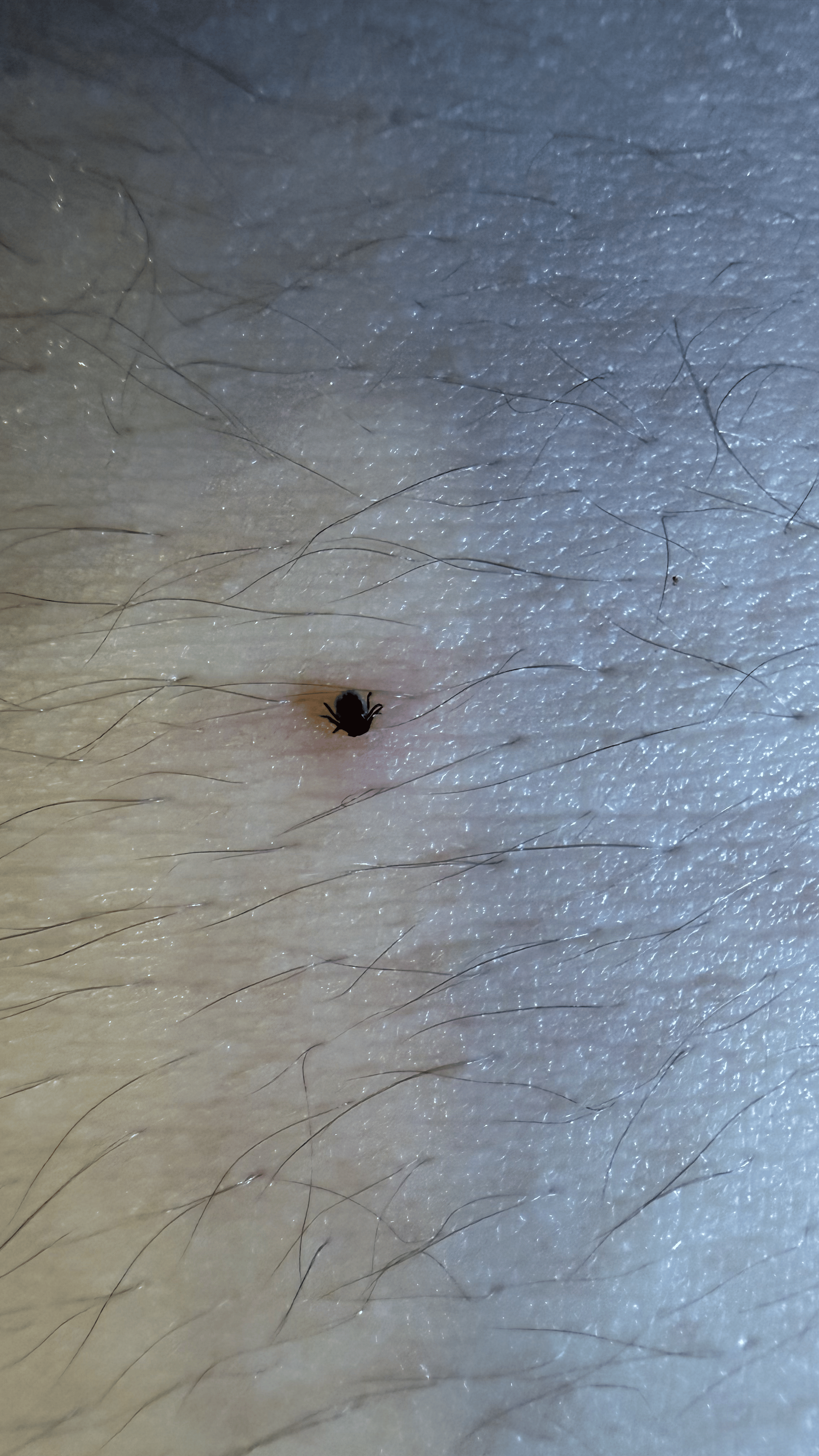
A tick embedded in skin

Ticks can transmit many kinds of pathogens, such as bacteria, viruses, and protozoa, that infect ticks' hosts. A tick can harbor more than one type of pathogen, making diagnosis more difficult. Species of the bacterial genus Rickettsia are responsible for typhus, rickettsialpox, boutonneuse fever, African tick bite fever, Rocky Mountain spotted fever, Flinders Island spotted fever, and Queensland tick typhus (Australian tick typhus). Other tick-borne diseases include Lyme disease and Q fever, Colorado tick fever, Crimean–Congo hemorrhagic fever, tularemia, tick-borne relapsing fever, babesiosis, ehrlichiosis, Bourbon virus, and tick-borne meningoencephalitis, as well as bovine anaplasmosis and the Heartland virus. In the United States, Lyme disease is the most commonly reported vector-borne disease in the country.

Some species, notably the Australian paralysis tick, are also intrinsically venomous and can cause tick paralysis. Eggs can become infected with pathogens inside a female tick's ovaries, in which case the larval ticks are infectious immediately at hatching, before feeding on their first host. Tropical bont ticks transmit the heartwater, which can be particularly devastating in cattle. The ticks carried by migratory birds act as reservoirs and vectors of foreign infectious diseases. In the Egyptian migratory bird study, over 20 strains of pathogenic viruses were detected within the tick sample from autumn.

Not all ticks in an infective area are infected with transmittable pathogens, and both attachment of the tick and a long feeding session are necessary for diseases to be transmitted. Consequently, tick bites often do not lead to infection, especially if the ticks are removed within 36 hours. Adult ticks can be removed with fine-tipped tweezers or proprietary tick removal tools, before then disinfecting the wound. In Australia and New Zealand, where tick-borne infections are less common than tick reactions, the Australasian Society of Clinical Immunology and Allergy recommends seeking medical assistance or killing ticks in-situ by freezing and then leaving them to fall out to prevent allergic/anaphylactic reactions. Professor Sheryl van Nunen, whose research in 2007 identified tick-induced mammalian meat allergy, famously said "tweezers are tick squeezers", referring to the tick toxins squeezed into people attempting to remove ticks with tweezers. Ticks can be disposed of by flushing them down the toilet, placing them in a container of soapy water or alcohol, or sticking them to tape that can then be folded over and thrown away.

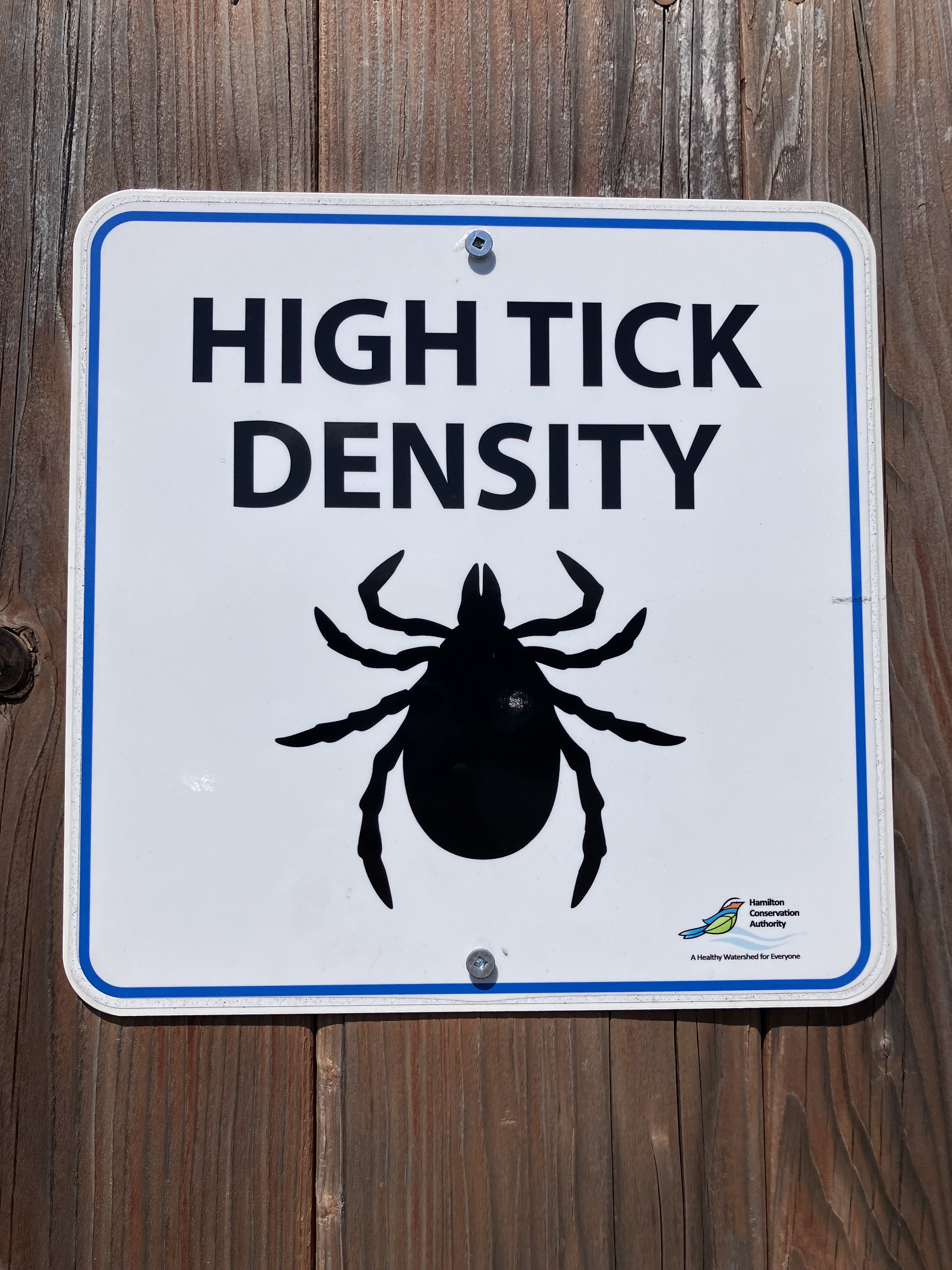
A sign in Ontario warning of the high risk for tick exposure

Bifenthrin and permethrin, both pyrethroids, are sometimes used as tick-control measures, although they have the disadvantage of being carcinogenic and able to attack the nervous systems of other species besides ticks. Those who walk through tick-infested areas can make it harder for ticks to latch onto them by tucking their trousers into boots made of smooth rubber, which ticks have trouble climbing.

Research since 2008 has documented red-meat allergies (mammalian meat allergy and Alpha-gal allergy) in the US due to lone star tick bites. The range of the problem has been expanding with the range of the tick. Other species of ticks are known for being responsible for meat allergies in other countries, including Sweden, Germany, and Australia.

Many tick-transmitted viruses, such as Crimean–Congo hemorrhagic fever virus, Kyasanur Forest disease virus, Alkhumra hemorrhagic fever virus, and Omsk hemorrhagic fever virus, are classified as dangerous enough to require biosafety level 4 precautions in laboratory environments. This includes five levels of containment, viz., storage vials within humidified desiccators, within environmental chambers, within a tick suite, within a BSL4 laboratory. Precautions such as glove boxes, sticky pads, Vaseline barriers, safety suits, gloves, sticky tape, silicone vacuum grease, sticky trap paste, and micro mesh are used to safely contain ticks and prevent them from escaping.

=== Population control measures ===
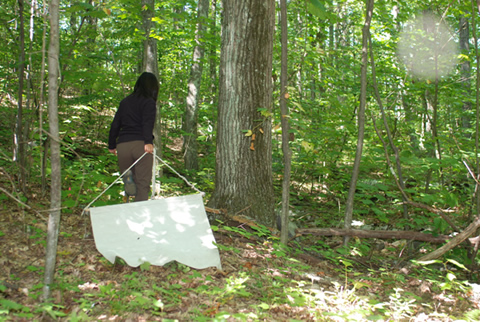
Researcher collecting ticks using the "tick dragging" method

With the possible exception of widespread DDT use in the Soviet Union, attempts to limit the population or distribution of disease-causing ticks have been quite unsuccessful. The parasitoid encyrtid wasp Ixodiphagus hookeri has been investigated for its potential to control tick populations. It lays its eggs in ticks; (Note: Micrographs of the wasp laying eggs into a tick, and the hole by which the young wasps emerge from the tick's dead body, are available in Plantard et al 2012.) the hatching wasps kill their hosts.

Predators and competitors of tick hosts can indirectly reduce the density of infected nymphs, thereby lowering tick-borne disease risk by lowering the density and/or tick burden of reservoir-competent hosts. A study in the Netherlands found that the number of larval ticks on bank voles and wood mice was lower at sites with significant red fox (Vulpes vulpes) and stone marten (Martes foina) activity.

This supports the results of a study from the northeastern United States, in which the incidence of Lyme borreliosis was negatively correlated with the density of red fox, possibly because foxes decrease the density of white-footed mice (Peromyscus leucopus), the most important reservoir-competent host for Borrelia burgdorferi.

Another natural form of control for ticks is the helmeted guineafowl, a bird species that consumes mass quantities of ticks. Opossums groom themselves, swallowing many ticks; they are net destroyers of ticks, killing around ninety percent of the ticks that attempt to feed on them. More generally, high animal diversity has a strongly protective effect against tick-borne disease.

Topical tick medicines may be toxic to animals and humans. The synthetic pyrethroid insecticide phenothrin in combination with the hormone analogue methoprene was a popular topical flea and tick therapy for felines. Phenothrin kills adult ticks, while methoprene kills eggs. Some cat products were withdrawn in the US due to adverse reactions, and others are known to cause adverse reactions.

== In the arts ==
In 2020, the world's first monument to a tick was erected in the Russian city of Ufa on a stone base from the Ural Mountains with the inscription: "I just want to live, just like you!".

The Tick is a parody superhero created by cartoonist Ben Edlund in 1986.

== See also ==
- Arachnids in medicine
- Parasitology
- Tick-borne disease
- Ticks of domestic animals
