= Subcapitulum =

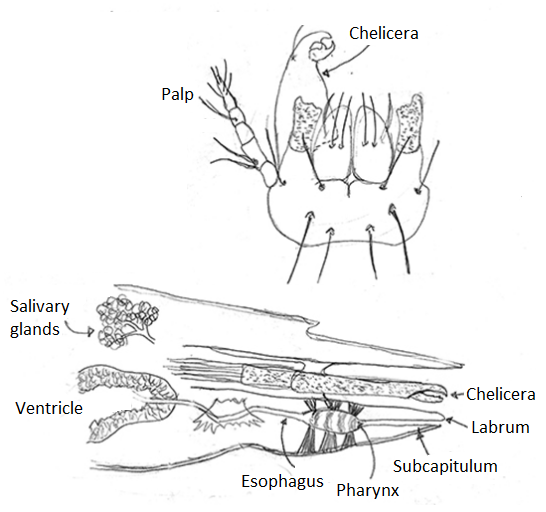
Illustration of the gnathosoma of an acarine, showing the subcapitulum

The subcapitulum (from Latin sub, "under", and capitulum, "small head"), also known as infracapitulum, hypognathum or hipognatum, refers to the ventral part of the gnathosoma (the part of the body comprising the mouth and feeding parts) or the fusion of the palpal (of the pedipalps, the second pair of appendages) coxae (the point of union of the appendages with the body) and the labrum (the upper mouthpart) complex present in some arthropods on which the mouth, pedipalps, mouthparts and pharynx are generally located. It is delimited by the subcapitular apodeme (an ingrowth of the exoskeleton for muscle attachment), which separates it from the cheliceral (of the chelicerae, the first pair of appendages) frame.

== Acari ==
The function or morphology of the subcapitulum can vary within acarines. In its central part, the hypostomal (of the hypostome, a harpoon-like appendage near the mouth) gutter in which the pincers are transformed into a serrated pricking system is formed. The anterolateral parts of the subcapitulum might be equipped with cornicula (horn-like processes) or rutella (hypertrophied setae on the hypostome). At the base of the hypostome, there can be sternal apophyses, that is, an outgrowth or process in the sternum (lower half of the body segment). In Mesostigmata, this happens in the third segment. The frontal edge of the subcapitulum can be provided with paralaciniae (a pair of small processes). In Oribatida, its basal section forms a mentum ("chin"). In some acariforms, the dorsal part forms a "neck". In some cheyletoids and myobiids, the subcapitulum merges with the stylophores (chelicerae formed of fused cheliceral bases) to form a gnathosomal capsule. In some prostigmates, the subcapitulum or the whole capsule is referred to as rostrum.

== Other arthropods ==
The subcapitulum is also present in other arthropod clades. In Ricinulei, an arachnid order related to acarines, the subcapitulum can also be found. In these organisms, the subcapitulum had a subcapitular apodeme and a crescent-shaped mouth, and lacked lateral lips. In comparison with other arachnids, the ricinuleid subcapitulum may result primitive, but it presents a specialization unique of the order; the coxal regions of the pedipalp are enlarged.

Another example would be Necrogammarus, an extinct genus of chelicerate eurypterid only known by its subcapitulum and attached pedipalp. In this genus, this structure adopts the form of a discrete plate.
