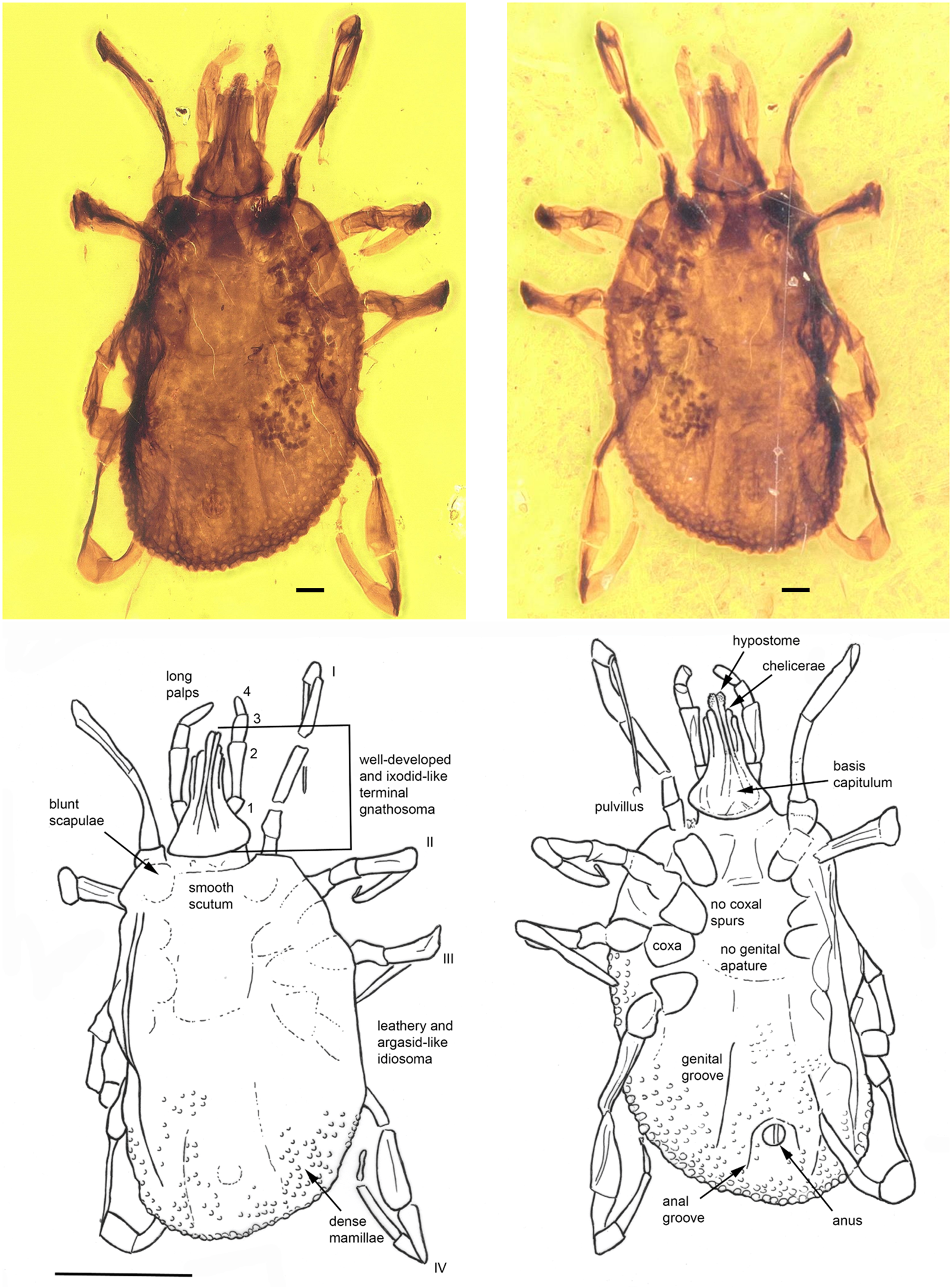

Scientific classification
- Kingdom: Animalia
- Phylum: Arthropoda
- Subphylum: Chelicerata
- Class: Arachnida
- Order: Ixodida
- Family: †Khimairidae; Chitimia-Dobler, Mans and Dunlop, 2022
- Genus: †Khimaira; Chitimia-Dobler, Mans and Dunlop, 2022
- Species: †K. fossus

Binomial name
- †Khimaira fossus Chitimia-Dobler et al., 2022

= Khimaira fossus =

Khimaira fossus Temporal range: mid-Cretaceous 100 Ma

Extinct genus of tick

Khimaira is an extinct genus of Cretaceous tick found in Burmese amber from Myanmar, and the only member of the family Khimairidae. The monotypic genus is represented by only one species, Khimaira fossus.

K. fossus is one of a number of paleobiota tick taxa identified in Burmese amber (Cenomanian, ~ 100 Ma), including from other basal Ixodida lineages such as Deinocroton, Legionaris and Nuttalliella. The Ixodida likely originated in Gondwana, with basal lineages such as Khimairidae, Nuttalliellidae and Bothriocrotoninae developing before the formation of the Incertus Arc at 155 Ma. The specimens identified in Burmese amber are the result of the dispersal and occupation of the Burma terrane by these lineages over the arc from Australian land.

The genus Khimaira is named for the chimera, a creature in Greek mythology made up of incongruous animal parts. The species, which is known from a juvenile (nymph) specimen, mirrors this chimerism, combining a soft body similar to those of argasid ticks with mouthparts and a true scutum more similar to those of hard-bodied ixodid ticks. This appearance led researchers to suggest the genus could represent a possible missing link between soft and hard bodied ticks.

However, the genus, as preserved, is mid-Cretaceous in age (~ 100 Ma), which neither predates the estimated Ixodidae/Argasidae split (~270 Ma), nor the Prostriata/Metastriata split. More importantly, the presence of fossils assignable to contemporary Ixodidae genera in the same amber formation indicate that K. fossus existed contemporaneously with these later lineages. As such, this specimen cannot represent the most recent common ancestor of the two main families.

Rather than being a directly ancestral lineage, the Khimairidae likely represent an early branch (Permian/Triassic) in the lineage that would go on to form modern tick families, with K. fossus being a late surivor of this earlier radiation. Similar instances of basal taxa with conserved plesiomorphic characters are a feature of mid-Cretaceous Burmese amber. As such, K. fossus represents the closest image we have of the precursor lineage to the Ixodidae and Argasidae.

- Ixodida
  - Nuttalliellidae
    - Nuttalliella
    - †Deinocroton
    - †Legionaris
  - - †Khimairidae
    - - Ixodidae (hard ticks)
        - Prostriata
        - Metastriata
      - Argasidae (soft ticks)
        - Argasinae
        - Ornithodorinae

Relationships of living and extinct tick families, after Chitimia-Dobler et al. (2022); Chitimia-Dobler et al. (2024).
