= Suidasiidae =

Scientific classification
- Kingdom: Animalia
- Phylum: Arthropoda
- Subphylum: Chelicerata
- Class: Arachnida
- Order: Sarcoptiformes
- Family: Suidasiidae

Family of arthropods

Suidasiidae is a family of mites belonging to the order Sarcoptiformes.

== Genera ==
The family consists of the following genera:

- Aphelinia
- Donnadieuia Zachvatkin, 1941
- Lemanniella Mahunka, 1977
- Namibacarus Fain, Coineau & André, 1993
- Sapracarus Fain & Philips, 1978
- Suidasia Oudemans, 1904
- Tortonia Oudemans, 1911
