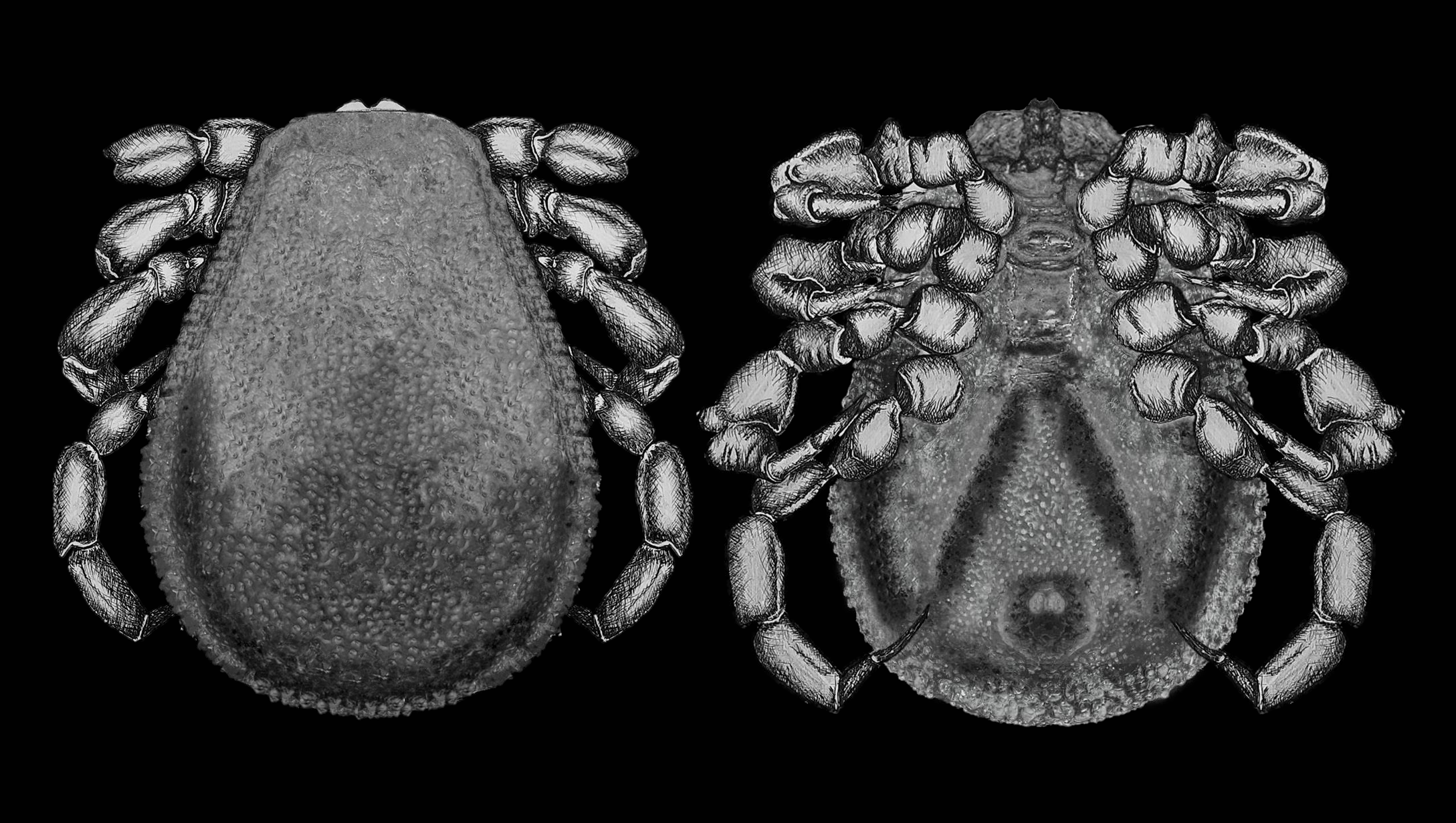
- Legionaris robustus, male, artist's rendering.

Scientific classification
- Kingdom: Animalia
- Phylum: Arthropoda
- Subphylum: Chelicerata
- Class: Arachnida
- Order: Ixodida
- Family: Nuttalliellidae
- Genus: †Legionaris; Chitimia-Dobler, Dunlop & Mans, 2024

Type species
- †Legionaris robustus Chitimia-Dobler, Dunlop & Mans, 2024

= Legionaris =

Legionaris Temporal range: Cenomanian–present

Genus of ticks

Legionaris is an extinct genus of ticks in the family Nuttalliellidae. The genus is currently monotypic, being represented only by the fossil species Legionaris robustus.

== Systematics ==
Legionaris was described alongside a growing number of basal tick fossil species. The genus name, Legionaris, refers to the "ever-expanding list of genera and species that belong to the larger Nuttalliellidae family". The description of the genus was a compelling factor in collapsing other similar fossil species, including the Deinocrotonidae, into the Nuttalliellidae. Legionaris is now one of three genera placed in the Nuttalliellidae, alongside Nuttalliella and Deinocroton. The shared characters circumscribing the family are:

"a pseudo-scutum/pseudo-conscutum, convoluted structure of the integument, sub-terminal mouthparts with arising of segments II–IV from the anterior segment and leg joints that extend deep into the preceding cavity, either as ball-and-socket (Nuttalliella, Legionaris) or approximating a socket joint (Deinocroton)".

As such, the Nuttalliellidae are distinguished from the Khimairidae, which are most notably characterised by an integumented body together with a true scutum. Cladogram after Chitimia‐Dobler et al. 2022 and 2024

- Ixodida (ticks)
  - Nuttalliellidae
    - Nuttalliella
    - †Deinocroton
    - †Legionaris
  - - †Khimairidae
      †Khimaira
    - Argasidae (soft ticks)
    - Ixodidae (hard ticks)

== Description ==
Legionaris robustus is most clearly characterised with reference to its legs, which are highly robust, with enlarged segmentation, hence the species name. Leg joints are condylar, with ovoid distal regions at articulation site. The basis capitulum is not visible dorsally, palpal article I is greatly enlarged, with palpal articles II-IV arising from the anterior segments. The genital aperture is laterally elongate and bipartite.
