= Arachnids in medicine =

Like plants and insects, arachnids have been used for thousands of years in traditional medical practices. Recent scientific research in natural bioactive factors has increased, leading to a renewed interest in venom components in many animals. In 1993 Margatoxin was synthesized from the venom of the Centruroides margaritatus the Central American bark scorpion. It is a peptide that selectively inhibits voltage-dependent potassium channels. Patented by Merck, it can potentially prevent neointimal hyperplasia, a common cause of bypass graft failure.

In addition to medical uses of arachnid defense compounds, a great amount of research has recently been directed toward synthesizing and using spider silk as a scaffolding for ligament generation. Spider silk is ideal for synthesizing medical skin grafts or ligament implants because it is one of the strongest known natural fibers and triggers little immune response in animals. Spider silk may also make fine sutures for stitching nerves or eyes to heal with little scarring. Medical uses of spider silk have been introduced previously. Spider silks have been used for centuries to fight infection and heal wounds. Efforts to produce industrial quantities and qualities of spider silk in transgenic goat milk are underway.

== Psychoactive scorpions ==
Recent news reports claim that use of scorpions for psychoactive purposes is gaining in popularity in Asia. Heroin addicts in Afghanistan are purported to smoke dried scorpions or use scorpion stings to get high when heroin is unavailable. Using scorpions as a psychoactive drug reportedly gives an instant high as strong or stronger than heroin. However, there is little information on the long-term effects of using scorpion toxins. The 'scorpion sting craze' has also increased in India with decreasing availability of other drugs and alcohol available to youth. Young people are reportedly flocking to highway sides where they can purchase scorpion stings that after several minutes of intense pain, supposedly produce a six- to eight-hour feeling of wellbeing.

== Tick saliva ==
Modern medical research has only recently begun investigating the drug development potential of blood-feeding insect saliva. These compounds in the saliva of blood-feeding insects can increase the ease of blood feeding by preventing the coagulation of platelets around the wound and providing protection against the host's immune response. Over 1280 different protein families have been associated with the saliva of blood-feeding organisms. This diverse range of compounds may include inhibitors of platelet aggregation, ADP, arachidonic acid, thrombin, and PAF; anticoagulants; vasodilators and vasoconstrictors; antihistamines; anaesthetics, and other functional substances.

Currently, some preliminary progress has been made with the investigation of the therapeutic properties of tick anticoagulant peptide (TAP) and Ixolaris, a novel recombinant tissue factor pathway inhibitor (TFPI) from the salivary gland of the tick, Ixodes scapularis. Additionally, Ixolaris, a tissue factor inhibitor, has been shown to block primary tumor growth and angiogenesis in a glioblastoma model. No modern medicines developed from the saliva of blood-sucking insects are currently on the market.
