= Hypostome (tick) =

Mouthparts of some parasitic arthropods

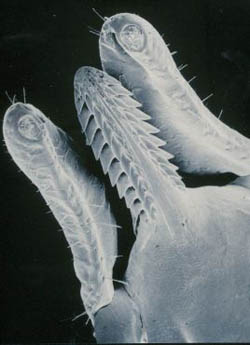
Barbed hypostome (center) of Ixodes holocyclus flanked by paired palps.

The hypostome (also called the maxilla, radula, or labium) is a calcified harpoon-like structure near the mouth area of certain parasitic arthropods including ticks, that allows them to anchor themselves firmly in place on a host vertebrate while sucking blood. The hypostome being present in almost all tick families suggests that hematophagy is the ancestral condition, as is the fact that life stages that do not feed on blood lack the organ.

Some ticks of the Ixodidae family (hard ticks) secrete a cement to strengthen the attachment.

== See also ==
- Mandible (arthropod)
