= 2024 in arthropod paleontology =

2024 in arthropod paleontology is a list of new arthropod fossil taxa, including arachnids, crustaceans, trilobites, and other arthropods (except insects, which have their own list) that were announced or described, as well as other significant arthropod paleontological discoveries and events which occurred in 2024.

== Chelicerates ==
=== Arachnids ===
==== Araneae ====
Name	Novelty	Status	Authors	Age	Type locality	Country	Notes	Images
Acanthomacrothele	Gen. et 3 sp. nov		Wang et al.	Cretaceous	Burmese amber	Myanmar	A member of the family Macrothelidae. Genus includes new species A. pauciverrucae, A. geminata and A. longicaudata.	
Anameta tertia	Sp. nov	Valid	Wunderlich	Eocene	Baltic amber	Europe (Baltic Sea region)	A possible long-jawed orb weaver.	
?Bararaneus rotundus	Sp. nov	Valid	Wunderlich	Eocene	Baltic amber	Europe (Baltic Sea region)	An orb-weaver spider. The spelling ?Baltaraneus rotundus is used in the paper naming it, but the discussion of its relationships tentatively refers it to the genus Bararaneus.	
Breviscauda	Gen. et sp. nov	Valid	Wunderlich	Cretaceous	Burmese amber	Myanmar	A tree trunk spider. The type species is B. translucens.	
Lineaburmops longiantepes	Sp. nov		Guo, Selden & Ren in Guo et al.	Late Cretaceous (Cenomanian)	Burmese amber	Myanmar	A spider belonging to the family Lagonomegopidae.	
Lineaburmops rhombus	Sp. nov		Guo et al.	Late Cretaceous (Cenomanian)	Burmese amber	Myanmar	A spider belonging to the family Lagonomegopidae.	
Longissipalpus albistriatus	Sp. nov	Valid	Hou et al.	Cretaceous	Burmese amber	Myanmar	A spider belonging to the family Pholcochyroceridae.	
Mengesilia	Gen. et sp. nov	Valid	Wunderlich	Eocene	Rovno amber	Ukraine	A tree trunk spider. The type species is M. rovnoensis.	
Myrmarachne colombiana	Sp.nov		Poinar	Quaternary	Colombian Amber	Colombia	An ant-mimick spider. Originally described as a species of Myrmarachne; Perger (2024) transferred it to the genus Myrmecium.	
Parvosegestria elegans	Sp. nov	Valid	Wunderlich	Cretaceous	Burmese amber	Myanmar	A possible tube-dwelling spider.	
Pedipalparaneus protumidus	Sp. nov	Valid	Hou et al.	Cretaceous	Burmese amber	Myanmar	A spider belonging to the family Pholcochyroceridae.	
Pholcophora gregorioi	Sp. nov		García-Villafuerte, Carbot-Chanona & Gómez-Pérez	Miocene	Mexican amber	Mexico	A species of Pholcophora.	

===== Araneological research =====
- Córdova-Tabares et al. (2024) describe a sac spider specimen from the Mexican amber preserved with an ant belonging to the genus Azteca, providing evidence of a fossil spider showing trapping and feeding behavior seen also in its extant relatives.

==== Ixodida ====
Name	Novelty	Status	Authors	Age	Type locality	Country	Notes	Images
Deinocroton bicornis	Sp. nov	Valid	Chitimia-Dobler, Dunlop & Mans in Chitimia-Dobler et al.	Cretaceous	Burmese amber	Myanmar	A tick belonging to the family Nuttalliellidae.	
Deinocroton lacrimus	Sp. nov	Valid	Chitimia-Dobler, Dunlop & Mans in Chitimia-Dobler et al.	Cretaceous	Burmese amber	Myanmar	A tick belonging to the family Nuttalliellidae.	
Legionaris	Gen. et sp. nov	Valid	Chitimia-Dobler, Dunlop & Mans in Chitimia-Dobler et al.	Cretaceous	Burmese amber	Myanmar	A tick belonging to the family Nuttalliellidae. The type species is L. robustus.	
Nuttalliella gratae	Sp. nov	Valid	Chitimia-Dobler, Dunlop & Mans in Chitimia-Dobler et al.	Cretaceous	Burmese amber	Myanmar	A species of Nuttalliella.	
Nuttalliella odyssea	Sp. nov	Valid	Chitimia-Dobler, Dunlop & Mans in Chitimia-Dobler et al.	Cretaceous	Burmese amber	Myanmar	A species of Nuttalliella.	
Nuttalliella placaventrala	Sp. nov	Valid	Chitimia-Dobler, Dunlop & Mans in Chitimia-Dobler et al.	Cretaceous	Burmese amber	Myanmar	A species of Nuttalliella.	
Nuttalliella tropicasylvae	Sp. nov	Valid	Chitimia-Dobler, Dunlop & Mans in Chitimia-Dobler et al.	Cretaceous	Burmese amber	Myanmar	A species of Nuttalliella.	
Nuttalliella tuberculata	Sp. nov	Valid	Chitimia-Dobler, Dunlop & Mans in Chitimia-Dobler et al.	Cretaceous	Burmese amber	Myanmar	A species of Nuttalliella.	

==== Opiliones ====
Name	Novelty	Status	Authors	Age	Type locality	Country	Notes	Images
?Leiobunum messelense	Sp. nov	Valid	Bartel, Dunlop & Wedmann	Eocene	Messel pit	Germany	Possibly a species of Leiobunum.	
?Leiobunum schaali	Sp. nov	Valid	Bartel, Dunlop & Wedmann	Eocene	Messel pit	Germany	Possibly a species of Leiobunum.	

===== Opiliones research =====
- Gainett et al. (2024) report that extant daddy longlegs have six eyes, including four vestigial ones, and reevaluate the affinities of fossil members of Opiliones with four eyes, resulting in older estimated ages of harvestman diversification.

==== Pseudoscorpiones ====
Name	Novelty	Status	Authors	Age	Type locality	Country	Notes	Images
Cretogarypinus	Gen. et sp. nov	Valid	Sánchez-García et al.	Early Cretaceous (Albian)	Escucha Formation	Spain	A member of the family Garypinidae. The type species is C. zaragozai.	
Geogaranya	Gen. et sp. nov	Valid	Agnihotri et al.	Eocene	Cambay Basin	India	A member of the family Geogarypidae. The type species is G. valiyaensis.	
Hya fynni	Sp. nov	Valid	Röschmann et al.	Late Cretaceous (Cenomanian)	Burmese amber	Myanmar	A member of the family Hyidae.	
Hysterochelifer manpauch	Sp. nov		Córdova-Tabares et al.	Miocene	Mexican amber	Mexico	A member of the family Cheliferidae.	
Ithioreolpium	Gen. et sp. nov	Valid	Sánchez-García et al.	Early Cretaceous (Albian)	Escucha Formation	Spain	A member of the family Garypinidae. The type species is I. alavensis.	

==== Sarcoptiformes ====
Name	Novelty	Status	Authors	Age	Type locality	Country	Notes	Images
Collohmannia albertii	Sp. nov	Valid	Kolesnikov, Vorontsov & Sidorchuk	Eocene	Baltic amber	Europe (Baltic Sea region)	A member of Oribatida belonging to the family Collohmanniidae.	
Collohmannia clavata	Sp. nov	Valid	Kolesnikov, Vorontsov & Sidorchuk	Eocene	Baltic amber	Europe (Baltic Sea region)	A member of Oribatida belonging to the family Collohmanniidae.	
Collohmannia groehni	Sp. nov	Valid	Kolesnikov, Vorontsov & Sidorchuk	Eocene	Baltic amber	Europe (Baltic Sea region)	A member of Oribatida belonging to the family Collohmanniidae.	
Collohmannia kerneggeri	Sp. nov	Valid	Kolesnikov, Vorontsov & Sidorchuk	Eocene	Baltic amber	Europe (Baltic Sea region)	A member of Oribatida belonging to the family Collohmanniidae.	
Collohmannia nortoni	Sp. nov	Valid	Kolesnikov, Vorontsov & Sidorchuk	Eocene	Baltic amber	Europe (Baltic Sea region)	A member of Oribatida belonging to the family Collohmanniidae.	
Collohmannia sellnicki	Sp. nov	Valid	Kolesnikov, Vorontsov & Sidorchuk	Eocene	Baltic amber	Europe (Baltic Sea region)	A member of Oribatida belonging to the family Collohmanniidae.	
Collohmannia weiterschani	Sp. nov	Valid	Kolesnikov, Vorontsov & Sidorchuk	Eocene	Baltic amber	Europe (Baltic Sea region)	A member of Oribatida belonging to the family Collohmanniidae.	

==== Schizomida ====
===== Schizomid research =====
- A study on changes of body size and shape diversity of male flagella in Schizomida throughout their evolutionary history is published by Belojević et al. (2024).

==== Scorpiones ====
Name	Novelty	Status	Authors	Age	Type locality	Country	Notes	Images
Betaburmesebuthus thomasvelteni	Sp. nov	Valid	Lourenço in Lourenço & Velten	Cretaceous	Burmese amber	Myanmar	A member of Buthoidea belonging to the family Palaeoburmesebuthidae	
Burmesescorpiops velteni	Sp. nov	Valid	Lourenço	Cretaceous	Burmese amber	Myanmar	A member of the family Palaeoeuscorpiidae.	
Chaerilobuthus petersi	Sp. nov	Valid	Lourenço in Lourenço & Velten	Cretaceous	Burmese amber	Myanmar	A member of the family Chaerilobuthidae or Pseudochactidae.	
Chaerilobuthus staxi	Sp. nov	Valid	Lourenço in Lourenço & Velten	Cretaceous	Burmese amber	Myanmar	A member of the family Chaerilobuthidae or Pseudochactidae.	
Paranotaburmesebuthus	Gen. et sp. nov	Valid	Lourenço in Lourenço & Velten	Cretaceous	Burmese amber	Myanmar	A member of Buthoidea belonging to the family Palaeoburmesebuthidae. The type species is P. schmidti.	
Serratochaerilobuthus	Gen. et sp. nov	Disputed	Lourenço in Lourenço & Velten	Cretaceous	Burmese amber	Myanmar	A member of the family Chaerilobuthidae or Pseudochactidae. The type species is S. schmidti. Xuan et al. (2025) considered the genus Serratochaerilobuthus to be a junior synonym of the genus Chaerilobuthus, though the authors maintained S. schmidti as a distinct species within the latter genus.	

===== Scorpion research =====
- Review of the higher classification of fossil scorpions is published by Dunlop & Garwood (2024) .
- Lourenço & Velten (2024) report the discovery of pro-juvenile specimens of Betaburmesebuthus kobberti trapped together in a piece of Burmese amber, and interpret this finding as possible evidence that Cretaceous palaeoburmesebuthid scorpions produced litters with reduced number of offspring but including large pro-juveniles.

==== Trombidiformes ====
Name	Novelty	Status	Authors	Age	Type locality	Country	Notes	Images
Pararesinacarus krczali	Sp. nov	Valid	Khaustov et al.	Eocene	Rovno amber	Ukraine	A mite belonging to the family Resinacaridae.	
Resinacarus longipilis	Sp. nov	Valid	Khaustov et al.	Eocene	Rovno amber	Ukraine	A mite belonging to the family Resinacaridae.	
Resinacarus striatus	Sp. nov	Valid	Khaustov et al.	Eocene	Rovno amber	Ukraine	A mite belonging to the family Resinacaridae.	
Resinacarus vitzthumi	Sp. nov	Valid	Khaustov et al.	Eocene	Rovno amber	Ukraine	A mite belonging to the family Resinacaridae.	
Rhombometridium	Gen. et sp. nov	Valid	Khaustov, Vorontsov & Lindquist	Cretaceous	Burmese amber	Myanmar	A mite belonging to the family Trochometridiidae. The type species is R. pankowskiorum.	

===== Trombidiform research =====
- Larvae of mites belonging to the group Erythraeoidea parasitising gall midges (providing evidence of an association unknown in extant fauna) are reported from the Cretaceous amber from Myanmar by Arce et al. (2024), who interpret this finding as indicative of shift of the host range of the studied mites after the Cretaceous.

==== Uropygi ====
Name	Novelty	Status	Authors	Age	Type locality	Country	Notes	Images
Mesoproctus rayoli	Sp. nov	Valid	Santana et al.	Early Cretaceous (Aptian—Albian)	Crato Formation	Brazil	A whip scorpion belonging to the family Thelyphonidae.	

==== Other arachnids ====
Name	Novelty	Status	Authors	Age	Type locality	Country	Notes	Images
Douglassarachne	Gen. et sp. nov	Valid	Selden & Dunlop	Carboniferous (Pennsylvanian)	Mazon Creek fossil beds	United States (Illinois)	A member of Pantetrapulmonata of uncertain affinities. The type species is D. acanthopoda.	

===== Other arachnid research =====
- A study on the mouthparts of members of the genus Palaeocharinus from the Rhynie chert (United Kingdom), providing evidence of the presence of a sophisticated mechanism for liquid feeding comparable to the filtration mechanisms of extant arachnids, is published by Long et al. (2024).
- A study on the structure of cuticles of Palaeocharinus, providing evidence of possible adaptations to terrestrial life, is published by Long et al. (2024).

=== Eurypterids ===
Name	Novelty	Status	Authors	Age	Type locality	Country	Notes	Images
Qujingopterus	Gen. et sp. nov		Ma et al.	Devonian	Xitun Formation	China	A member of the family Stylonuridae. The type species is Q. spineus.	

==== Eurypterid research ====
- A study on the evolution of eurypterid body size is published by Ruebenstahl et al. (2024), who find that giant size evolved independently in different eurypterid lineages, without clear relation to habitat or environmental drivers.
- Bicknell et al. (2024) describe new fossil material of Silurian and Devonian eurypterids from the Wallace Shale and Merrimerriwa Formation (Australia), extending known geographical range of Jaekelopterus into Gondwana.
- A diverse assemblage of eurypterid remains, including isolated setae and cuticular sheets with attached setae, is described from the Devonian Ora Formation (Iraq) by Makled et al. (2024).
- Braddy (2024) studies the life mode of carcinosomatoid eurypterids, interpreting them as slow-swimming ambush predators and mud grubbers, and interprets megalograptids as likely more basal than carcinosomatids and mixopterids.
- Bicknell, Gaines & Hopkins (2024) describe a carcinosomatid specimen from the Ordovician strata from the Beecher's Trilobite Bed (New York, United States) preserving the first evidence for mesosomal musculature in eurypterids, and providing evidence that eurypterid musculature can be preserved in pyrite.
- Poschmann & Tollerton (2024) describe a new specimen of Eysyslopterus patteni from the Silurian Rootsiküla/Saaremaa Lagerstätte (Estonia), providing information on the morphology of the metastoma of the studied eurypterid.
- Description of genital appendages of Acutiramus macrophthalmus is published by Cheng & Briggs (2024).

=== Xiphosurans ===
==== Xiphosuran research ====
- A specimen of Tachypleus syriacus preserved with intestinal contents transitioning into a coprolite is described from the Cenomanian Hjoula Lagerstätte (Lebanon) by Bicknell et al. (2024).

=== Other chelicerates ===
Name	Novelty	Status	Authors	Age	Type locality	Country	Notes	Images
Titanoprosoma	Gen. et sp. nov	Valid	Bicknell et al.	Carboniferous (Serpukhovian)	Bear Gulch Limestone	United States (Montana)	A member of Euchelicerata of uncertain affinities. The type species is T. edgecombei.	
Setapedites	Gen. et sp. nov	Valid	Lustri et al.	Lower Ordovician	Fezouata Formation	Morocco	A member of Euchelicerata recovered as an offacolid synziphosurine. The type species is S. abundantis.	

==== Other chelicerate research ====
- Lustri et al. (2024) describe new fossil material of Bunaia woodwardi from the Silurian (Přídolí) Williamsville Formation of the Bertie Group (Ontario, Canada), and interpret B. woodwardi as a member of the family Offacolidae.
- Revision of the taxonomy, morphology and stratigraphical distribution of members of the genus Limuloides is published by Howard (2024).
- Sabroux et al. (2024) revise the fossil material of Devonian sea spiders from the Hunsrück Slate (Germany), providing new information on their anatomy and affinities, and find no compelling evidence of Pantopoda in the Devonian.

== Crustaceans ==
=== Malacostracans ===
Name	Novelty	Status	Authors	Age	Type locality	Country	Notes	Images
Aguadites	Gen. et sp. nov		Vega, Garassino, Nyborg & Pasini in Vega et al.	Late Cretaceous		Cuba	A raninoid crab. The type species is A. hexagranula.	
Binkhorstia desaegheri	Sp. nov	Valid	Van Bakel et al.	Late Cretaceous (Santonian)	Vaals Formation	Belgium	A crab belonging to the superfamily Retroplumoidea and the family Binkhorstiidae.	
Bournelyreidus grahamae	Sp. nov	Valid	Nyborg et al.	Late Cretaceous (Campanian)	Northumberland Formation	Canada (British Columbia)	A raninoid crab.	
Calverteca	Gen. et sp. nov	Valid	Godfrey, Feldmann & Schweitzer	Miocene	Calvert Formation	United States (Virginia)	An isopod belonging to the family Cymothoidae. The type species is C. osbornei.	
Carcinoplax jonica	Sp. nov	Valid	Garassino & Pasini in Girone et al.	Pleistocene		Italy	A crab belonging to the family Goneplacidae.	
Cretagourretia	Gen. et sp. nov	Valid	Ossó, Charbonnier, Hyžný, van Bakel & Devillez in Ossó et al.	Early Cretaceous (Albian)	Escucha Formation	Spain	A member of the family Ctenochelidae. The type species is C. salasi.	
Distefania buerai	Sp. nov	Valid	Ossó et al.	Late Cretaceous (Cenomanian)	Picofrentes Formation	Spain	A crab belonging to the family Dromiidae and the subfamily Goniodromitinae.	
Dugastella nitida	Comb. nov	Valid	(Milne-Edwards)	Oligocene (Chattian)		France	A shrimp belonging to the family Atyidae; moved from Caridina nitida Milne-Edwards (1879).	
Eoactinotocarcinus	Gen. et comb. nov	Valid	Ferratges	Eocene	Roda Formation	Spain	A crab belonging to the subfamily Actinotocarcininae. The type species is "Periacanthus" tetracornis Ferratges et al. (2014)	
Eogmelina	Gen. et 2 sp. nov	Valid	Copilaş-Ciocianu & Ionesi	Miocene		Romania	An amphipod belonging to the family Gammaridae. The type species is E. moldavica; genus also includes E. prisca.	
Faksecarcinus prealpinus	Sp. nov	Valid	De Angeli & Lovato	Eocene		Italy	A crab belonging to the group Portunoidea.	
Halicarcinus popeius	Sp. nov	Valid	Gašparič et al.	Oligocene (Chattian)	Trbovlje Formation	Slovenia	A crab belonging to the family Hymenosomatidae.	
Icriocarcinus aldersonorum	Sp. nov	Valid	Nyborg & Garassino	Late Cretaceous (Campanian)	Tuna Canyon Formation	United States (California)	A crab belonging to the family Lithophylacidae.	
Ixoides miocenicus	Sp. nov		Garassino, Pasini, Mirzaie Ataabadi & Nyborg in Garassino et al.	Miocene (Tortonian)		Iran	A crab belonging to the family Leucosiidae and the subfamily Ebaliinae.	
Joeranina tausi	Sp. nov	Valid	Ossó, Charbonnier, Hyžný, van Bakel & Devillez in Ossó et al.	Early Cretaceous (Albian)	Escucha Formation	Spain	A crab belonging to the family Palaeocorystidae.	
Lucascinus trifailensis	Sp. nov	Valid	Gašparič et al.	Oligocene (Chattian)	Trbovlje Formation	Slovenia	A crab belonging to the family Hymenosomatidae.	
Makrokylindrus itoi	Sp. nov	Valid	Luque & Gerken	Plio-Pleistocene	Hijikata Formation	Japan	A member of the family Diastylidae.	
Minohellenus grolaensis	Sp. nov	Valid	De Angeli & Lovato	Eocene		Italy	A crab belonging to the group Portunoidea.	
Necrocarcinus sibiricus	Sp. nov		Kočová Veselská et al.	Late Cretaceous		Russia (Krasnoyarsk Krai)	A crab belonging to the family Necrocarcinidae.	
Neogoneplax bradanica	Sp. nov	Valid	Garassino & Pasini in Girone et al.	Pleistocene		Italy	A crab belonging to the family Goneplacidae.	
Noetlingocarcinus minutus	Sp. nov	Valid	De Angeli, Ceccon & Caporiondo	Oligocene		Italy	A crab belonging to the superfamily Dromioidea and the family Basinotopidae.	
Palaeobresilia	Gen. et sp. nov	Valid	Winkler et al.	Late Jurassic		Germany	A shrimp belonging to the superfamily Bresilioidea. The type species is P. kurthetriegeri.	
Parahyas	Gen. et comb. nov	Valid	Charbonnier et al.	Miocene (Messinian)		Algeria	A crab belonging to the superfamily Majoidea and the family Oregoniidae. The type species is "Hyas" oranensis Van Straelen (1937).	
Paranecrocarcinus xivertensis	Sp. nov	Valid	Ossó, Charbonnier, Hyžný, van Bakel & Devillez in Ossó et al.	Early Cretaceous (Aptian)	Benassal Formation	Spain	A crab belonging to the family Necrocarcinidae.	
Persianus	Gen. et sp. nov		Garassino, Pasini, Mirzaie Ataabadi & Nyborg in Garassino et al.	Miocene (Tortonian)		Iran	A crab belonging to the family Portunidae. The type species is P. arcuatus.	
Pilumnus pianetensis	Sp. nov	Valid	De Angeli, Ceccon & Caporiondo	Oligocene		Italy	A species of Pilumnus.	
Portunus bericensis	Sp. nov	Valid	De Angeli & Bellin	Eocene		Italy	A species of Portunus.	
Portunus planargiaensis	Sp. nov	Valid	Pasini & Garassino	Miocene		Italy	A species of Portunus.	
Pseudocarcinus karlraubenheimeri	Sp. nov	Valid	Van Bakel & Ossó	Miocene (Tongaporutuan)	Urenui Formation	New Zealand	A relative of the Tasmanian giant crab.	
Pyrenicola	Gen. et comb. nov	Valid	Artal & Ossó	Paleocene and Eocene		France; Spain; United States (California)	A crab belonging to the family Geryonidae. The type species is "Xanthilites" macrodactylus Van Straelen (1924); genus also includes "Coeloma" martinezensis Rathbun (1926) and "Xanthilites macrodactylus" pyrenaicus Artal & Vía (1989), raised to the rank of the species Pyrenicola pyrenaica.	
Raninoides granulofrons	Sp. nov		Vega, Garassino, Nyborg & Pasini in Vega et al.	Late Cretaceous		Cuba	A raninoid crab.	
Rhinopterocaris fordycei	Sp. nov	Valid	Liu et al.	Ordovician	Preservation Formation	New Zealand	A member of Phyllocarida belonging to the family Caryocarididae.	
Rodanina	Gen. et sp. nov		Vega, Garassino, Nyborg & Pasini in Vega et al.	Late Cretaceous		Cuba	A raninoid crab. The type species is R. monosensis.	
Schramocaris robusta	Comb. nov		(Peach)	Carboniferous (Tournaisian)	Ballagan Formation	United Kingdom	A member of the family Tealliocarididae. Moved from Tealliocaris robusta Peach (1908).	
Silvacarcinus cisuralicus	Sp. nov	Valid	Mychko, Schweitzer & Feldmann	Late Cretaceous (Campanian)		Russia (Orenburg Oblast)	A crab belonging to the family Orithopsidae.	
Solteria	Gen. et sp. nov	Valid	Garassino et al.	Eocene		Italy	A member of Caridea. Genus includes new species S. spinosa.	
Tealliocaris briggsi	Sp. nov		Clark & Ross	Carboniferous (Tournaisian)	Ballagan Formation	United Kingdom	A member of the family Tealliocarididae.	
Tealliocaris elliotti	Sp. nov		Clark	Carboniferous (Bashkirian)		United Kingdom	A member of the family Tealliocarididae.	
Tealliocaris weegie	Sp. nov		Clark & Ross	Carboniferous (Mississippian)		United Kingdom	A member of the family Tealliocarididae.	
Trentastacus	Gen. et sp. nov	Valid	Garassino et al.	Eocene		Italy	A member of Astacida. Genus includes new species T. levis.	
Tumulosternum ortegai	Sp. nov	Valid	Ferratges	Eocene	Roda Formation	Spain	A crab belonging to the family Majidae.	
Uncina ultima	Sp. nov	Valid	Charbonnier et al.	Late Jurassic (Tithonian)		Germany	An uncinid lobster.	
Venzia	Gen. et sp. nov	Valid	Garassino et al.	Eocene		Italy	A member of Caridea. Genus includes new species V. ypresiana.	
Vincentdromia	Gen. et comb. nov	Valid	Schweitzer	Eocene (Ypresian)	Vincentown Formation	United States (New Jersey)	A crab belonging to the family Dromiidae. The type species is "Dromiopsis" americana Roberts (1956).	
Wahrania	Gen. et comb. nov	Valid	Charbonnier et al.	Miocene (Messinian)		Algeria	A crab belonging to the superfamily Majoidea and the family Epialtidae. The type species is "Maia" arambourgi Van Straelen (1937).	

==== Malacostracan research ====
- A study on the hydrodynamic performance of carapaces of caryocaridid archaeostracans, providing evidence that the carapace shapes facilitated the pelagic mode of life of caryocaridids, is published by Pates & Xue (2024).
- A study on carapaces of specimens of the caryocaridid species Soomicaris cedarbergensis from the Ordovician Xinertai Formation (China), providing probable evidence of adaptations to the pelagic lifestyle, is published by Liu et al. (2024).
- Bicknell et al. (2024) describe fossil material of mantis shrimps belonging to the group Archaeostomatopodea and possibly to the genus Tyrannophontes from the Carboniferous Wea Shale Member of the Cherryvale Shale (Nebraska, United States), preserving the oldest evidence of the presence of biramous gilled appendages in mantis shrimps reported to date.
- Redescription of Kellnerius jamacaruensis is published by Barros, Oliveira & Saraiva (2024), who reaffirm the inclusion of this shrimp within the family Palaemonidae.
- Charbonnier et al. (2024) present the first reconstruction of the internal anatomy of Eryma ventrosum, based on data from a well-preserved female and male specimens from the La Voulte-sur-Rhône Lagerstätte (France).
- Purported crushing teeth of teleosts or Lepidotes from the Upper Cretaceous Allen, Los Alamitos, La Colonia, Loncoche and Chorrillo formations (Argentina) are reinterpreted as bio-gastroliths (temporary structures within the lateral walls of the stomach, serving as reservoirs of calcium carbonate before molting) of members of Astacidea by Panzeri et al. (2024).
- Luque et al. (2024) provide fossil node calibration points for the studies of the phylogenetic relationships of crabs, and reassess the earliest occurrences of members of several crab groups.
- Redescription of "Dromiopsis" oscari is published by LaBonte, Schweitzer & Feldmann (2024) who transfer this crab from the family Dynomenidae to the family Goniodromitidae and to the genus Sabellidromites.
- A study on the diversity and distribution of crabs belonging to the group Homoloida throughout their evolutionary history is published by Shaffer & Schweitzer (2024).

=== Ostracods ===
Name	Novelty	Status	Authors	Age	Type locality	Country	Notes	Images
Adeditia tkachovae	Sp. nov		Sobolev	Devonian-Carboniferous transition		Russia	A member of the family Editiidae.	
Aleisocythereis? picnus	Sp. nov		Ceolin et al.	Cretaceous–Palaeogene transition		Argentina		
Ampuloides thungsamedensis	Sp. nov		Promduang & Chitnarin	Late Silurian -Early Devonian	Kuan Tung Formation	Thailand	A member of Podocopida belonging to the family Pachydomellidae.	
Aurila hokkaidoensis	Sp. nov		Mukai & Tanaka	Miocene	Kaigarabashi Formation	Japan		
Batecypris	Gen. et sp. nov	Valid	Almeida-Lima et al.	Early Cretaceous (Aptian)	Crato Formation	Brazil	Genus includes new species B. reticularis.	
Bathoniella	Gen. et comb. et 3 sp. nov	Valid	Tesakova	Middle Jurassic (Bathonian and Callovian)		Belarus; Germany; Russia; Ukraine	A member of Podocopida belonging to the family Progonocytheridae. The type species is "Palaeocytheridea" milanovskyi Lyubimova (1955); genus also includes new species B. prima, B. paenultima and B. ultima.	
Blumeditia	Gen. et 3 sp. nov		Sobolev	Devonian-Carboniferous transition		Russia	A member of the family Editiidae. Genus includes new species B. eleganta, B. auctus and B. pretzella.	
Callistocythere imaganensis	Sp. nov		Mukai & Tanaka	Miocene	Kaigarabashi Formation	Japan		
Cloughtonella brauni	Sp. nov	Valid	Franz	Middle Jurassic		Germany	A member of the family Progonocytheridae.	
Cuspicypris	Nom. nov	Valid	Guillam	Early Cretaceous	Orós Formation	Brazil	A member of Cypridoidea; a replacement name for Hastacypris Filho, Fauth & Sames.	
Cyprideis goeldiensis	Sp. nov		Ferreira & Ramos	Neogene	Solimões Formation	Brazil		
Cyprideis javariensis	Sp. nov		Ferreira & Ramos	Neogene	Solimões Formation	Brazil		
Cytheropterina ainsworthi	Sp. nov	Valid	Cabral, Lord & Pinto in Cabral et al.	Early Jurassic (Toarcian)	Póvoa da Lomba Formation	Portugal	A member of the family Cytheruridae.	
Derima	Gen. et sp. nov		Siveter et al.	Silurian	Herefordshire Lagerstätte	United Kingdom	A member of Beyrichicopida belonging to the group Binodicopina and the family Bolliidae. The type species is D. paparme.	
Eucytherura alvaiazerensis	Sp. nov	Valid	Cabral, Lord & Pinto in Cabral et al.	Early Jurassic (Toarcian)	Póvoa da Lomba Formation	Portugal	A member of the family Cytheruridae.	
Eucytherura nodosalata	Sp. nov	Valid	Franz	Middle Jurassic		Germany	A member of the family Cytheruridae.	
Hemiparacytheridea condilomata	Sp. nov		Ceolin et al.	Cretaceous–Palaeogene transition		Argentina		
Hysterocythereis acuminata	Sp. nov		Ceolin et al.	Cretaceous–Palaeogene transition		Argentina		
Macunhaella	Gen. et sp. nov	Valid	Almeida-Lima et al.	Early Cretaceous (Aptian)	Crato Formation	Brazil	Genus includes new species M. posteroaltis.	
Neonesidea chapminuta	Sp. nov		McDonald, Weldon & Warne	Pliocene (Zanclean)	Jemmys Point Formation	Australia	A member of the family Bairdiidae.	
Oculocytheropteron jemmyensis	Sp. nov		McDonald, Weldon & Warne	Pliocene (Zanclean)	Jemmys Point Formation	Australia	A member of the family Cytheruridae.	
Ophektycythere	Gen. et 3 sp. nov	Valid	Cabral & Lord in Cabral et al.	Jurassic (Toarcian and Aalenian)	São Gião Formation	Portugal; United Kingdom	A member of the family Protocytheridae. The type species is O. herrrigi; genus also includes O. mataensis and possibly also O.? sicoensis.	
Otocythere iberobritannica	Sp. nov	Valid	Cabral & Lord in Cabral et al.	Early Jurassic (Toarcian)	Póvoa da Lomba Formation	Portugal; United Kingdom	A member of the family Cytheruridae.	
Parabathoniella	Gen. et comb. nov	Valid	Tesakova	Middle Jurassic (Bathonian)		United Kingdom	A member of Podocopida belonging to the family Progonocytheridae. The type species is "Acanthocythere" elongata Wakefield (1994).	
Paramunseyella stictus	Sp. nov		Ceolin et al.	Cretaceous–Palaeogene transition		Argentina		
Philoneptunus plutonis	Sp. nov		McDonald, Weldon & Warne	Pliocene (Zanclean)	Jemmys Point Formation	Australia	A member of the family Trachyleberididae.	
Procytherura praecoquum	Sp. nov		Forel et al.	Late Jurassic (Oxfordian)	Terres Noires Formation	France		
Procytherura ursheimensis	Sp. nov	Valid	Franz	Middle Jurassic		Germany	A member of the family Cytheruridae.	
Procytherura variecostata	Sp. nov	Valid	Franz	Middle Jurassic		Germany	A member of the family Cytheruridae.	
Proeditia auriculata dimorpha	Ssp. nov		Sobolev	Devonian-Carboniferous transition		Russia	A member of the family Editiidae.	
Pseudonotacythere	Gen. et 2 sp. nov	Valid	Franz	Middle Jurassic		Germany	A member of the family Cytheruridae. The type species is P. cittadella; genus also includes P. mediocostata.	
Rozhdestvenskayella	Nom. nov	Valid	Guillam	Devonian (Frasnian)		Russia	A replacement name for Ornatella Rozhdestvenskaya in Chibrikova & Rozhdestvenskaya (1959).	
Rudolfestatscaphium	Nom. nov		Li	Silurian		Germany	A member of the family Bythocytheridae; a replacement name for Scaphium Jordan (1964). Published online in 2024, but the issue date is listed as December 2023.	
Tasmanocypris salaputia	Sp. nov		McDonald, Weldon & Warne	Pliocene (Zanclean)	Jemmys Point Formation	Australia	A member of the family Candonidae.	
Theriosynoecum favus	Sp. nov	Valid	Almeida-Lima et al.	Early Cretaceous (Aptian)	Crato Formation	Brazil		
Timiriasevia aratra	Sp. nov	Valid	Almeida-Lima et al.	Early Cretaceous (Aptian)	Crato Formation	Brazil		
Wangshangkia jiwozhaiensis	Sp. nov		Song in Song et al.	Devonian (Givetian)	Dushan Formation	China	A member of Podocopida belonging to the superfamily Bairdiocypridoidea and the family Bairdiocyprididae.	
Wolburgiopsis magnafossa	Sp. nov	Valid	Almeida-Lima et al.	Early Cretaceous (Aptian)	Ipubi Formation	Brazil		

==== Ostracod research ====
- A study on pores and associated canals in extant and Triassic ornate bairdiids, providing new morphological data interpret as supporting the interpretation of the Triassic genera Mirabairdia and Nodobairdia as distinct from the extant genus Triebelina, is published by Forel et al. (2024).
- Taxonomic revision of ostracods from the Lower Cretaceous Codó Formation (Brazil) is published by Coimbra & Petró (2024).
- A study on changes of the diversity of ostracods from the Indo-Australian Archipelago region throughout the Cenozoic, aiming to determine factors responsible for recorded changes, is published by Tian et al. (2024), who argue that the studied region became the richest marine biodiversity hotspot mostly as a result of immunity to major extinction events during the Cenozoic, shift towards colder climate and the increase in habitat size (shelf area).

=== Thecostracans ===
Name	Novelty	Status	Authors	Age	Type locality	Country	Notes	Images
Eolepas moorei	Sp. nov	Valid	Gale	Late Triassic (Rhaetian)	Westbury Formation	United Kingdom	A barnacle belonging to the family Eolepadidae.	
Icenilepas norvicensis	Sp. nov	Valid	Gale	Late Cretaceous (Campanian)		United Kingdom	A barnacle.	
Leweslepas cultellum	Sp. nov	Valid	Gale	Late Cretaceous (Coniacian or Santonian)		United Kingdom	A barnacle.	
Nitidalepas	Gen. et comb. et sp. nov	Valid	Gale	Cretaceous		United Kingdom	A barnacle. The type species is "Arcoscalpellum" transversum Withers (1935); genus also includes new species N. dibleyi.	
Parastramentum cenomanense	Sp. nov	Valid	Gale	Late Cretaceous (Cenomanian)	Zig Zag Chalk Formation	United Kingdom	A barnacle.	
Subsecolepas dubrisiensis	Sp. nov	Valid	Gale	Late Cretaceous (Cenomanian)	Zig Zag Chalk Formation	United Kingdom	A barnacle.	
Subsecolepas paulsgrovensis	Sp. nov	Valid	Gale	Late Cretaceous (Campanian)	Newhaven Formation	United Kingdom	A barnacle.	
Zeugmatolepas capelensis	Sp. nov	Valid	Gale	Early Cretaceous (Hauterivian)	Weald Clay	United Kingdom	A barnacle.	
Zeugmatolepas eocenica	Sp. nov	Valid	Gale	Eocene (Lutetian)	Selsey Formation	United Kingdom	A barnacle.	
Zeugmatolepas gaultinum	Sp. nov	Valid	Gale	Early Cretaceous (Albian)	Gault Clay	United Kingdom	A barnacle.	
Zeugmatolepas vectensis	Sp. nov	Valid	Gale	Early Cretaceous (Aptian)	Vectis Formation	United Kingdom	A barnacle.	

=== Other crustaceans ===
Name	Novelty	Status	Authors	Age	Type locality	Country	Notes	Images
Cornia wasvilrensis	Sp. nov	Valid	Poschmann et al.	Devonian	Klerf Formation	Germany	A clam shrimp.	
Eicheleaia	Gen. et sp. nov	Valid	Poschmann et al.	Devonian	Klerf Formation	Germany	A clam shrimp. The type species is E. wenndorfi.	
Grauvogelocaris	Gen. et sp. nov	Valid	Geyer, Hegna & Kelber	Triassic (Anisian)	Grès à Voltzia	France	A member of the stem lineage of Diplostraca. The type species is G. alsatica.	
Jurapingquania	Nom. nov	Valid	Ceccolini & Cianferoni	Late Jurassic	Tuchengzi Formation	China	A member of the family Eosestheriidae; a replacement name for Pingquania Wang in Wang & Li (2008). Published online in 2024, but the issue date is listed as December 2023.	
Olesenocaris	Gen. et sp. nov	Valid	Geyer, Hegna & Kelber	Triassic (Anisian)	Grès à Voltzia	France	A non-calmanostracan phyllopod, possibly belonging to the stem lineage of Diplostraca. The type species is O. galli.	
Palaeolimnadiopsis frankeorum	Sp. nov	Valid	Poschmann et al.	Devonian		Germany	A clam shrimp.	
Punctatestheria yaojieensis	Sp. nov	Valid	Xue & Li	Middle–Late Jurassic	Yaojie Formation	China	A clam shrimp.	
Shipingia luchangensis	Comb. nov		(Chen)	Late Triassic (Rhaetian)		China	A clam shrimp. Originally described as Euestheria? luchangensis Chen (1974).	
Triglypta hebeiensis	Sp. nov	Valid	Liao & Huang in Liao et al.	Middle Jurassic (Callovian)	Longmen Formation	China	A clam shrimp belonging to the superfamily Eosestherioidea and the family Triglyptidae.	

==== Other crustacean research ====
- Alarcón et al. (2024) report the discovery of new clam shrimp assemblages from the Upper Triassic (Norian) Bocas and Montebel formations (Colombia), providing evidence of a similar composition of Norian clamp shrimp assemblages from northwestern Gondwana and rift basins of central Pangea (but different from those from southern Gondwana).

== Radiodonts ==
Name	Novelty	Status	Authors	Age	Type locality	Country	Notes	Images
Shucaris ankylosskelos	Gen. et sp. nov	Valid	Wu et al.	Cambrian Stage 3	Maotianshan Shales	China	A radiodont of uncertain phylogenetic placement. The type species is S. ankylosskelos.	
Stanleycaris qingjiangensis	Sp. nov	Valid	Wu et al.	Cambrian Stage 3	Qingjiang Lagerstätte	China	A radiodont of the hurdiidae (peytoiidae) family. Another species, S. hirpex is known from North America.	

== Trilobites ==
Name	Novelty	Status	Authors	Age	Type locality	Country	Notes	Images
Alatacastava	Gen. et comb. nov	Valid	Van Viersen & Müller	Devonian (Pragian–Emsian transition)	Abadía Formation	France; Luxembourg; Spain	A member of the family Acastidae. The type species is "Pelitlina" corbachoi Basse & Müller (2016); genus also includes "Pelitlina" smeenki Lieberman & Kloc (1997) and "Acastava" faberi Basse & Franke (2006).	
Andalusiana palaciosi	Sp. nov	Valid	Sepúlveda et al.	Cambrian Stage 4	Soleras Formation	Spain	A member of Redlichiida belonging to the group Olenellina.	
Arduennella janseni	Sp. nov	Valid	Van Viersen & Müller	Devonian (Emsian)		Luxembourg	A member of the family Homalonotidae.	
Bienvillia eurekensis	Sp. nov	Valid	Taylor, Loch & Repetski	Cambrian (Furongian)	Windfall Formation	United States (Nevada)	A member of the family Olenidae.	
Bailiella marginalis	Sp. nov	Valid	Geyer	Cambrian (Drumian)	Lippertsgrün Formation	Germany	A member of the family Conocoryphidae.	
Bailiella niuxinshanensis	Sp. nov	Valid	Geyer	Cambrian	Changia Formation	China	A member of the family Conocoryphidae.	
Balticoglaucus	Gen. et comb. nov	Disputed	Geyer	Cambrian	Alum Shale Formation	Sweden	A member of the family Solenopleuridae. The type species is "Liostracus" linnarssoni Brøgger (1878); genus also includes "Parasolenopleura" spinigera Westergård (1953) and possibly "Lonchocephalus" peregrinus Wallerius (1930). Westrop & Landing (2025) did not consider the genus to be demonstrably monophyletic, and considered it to be a possible synonym of Balticomerope.	
Balticomerope	Gen. et comb. et sp. nov	Disputed	Geyer	Cambrian	Alum Shale Formation	Denmark; Russia; Sweden	A member of the family Solenopleuridae. The type species is "Parasolenopleura" scanica Westergård (1953); genus also includes "Parasolenopleura linnarssoni" brevicauda Westergård (1953), "Solenopleura" flerovae Lermontova in Chernysheva (1953) and "Solenopleura" djainensis Lermontova in Chernysheva (1953) as well as new species B. bornholmensis. Westrop & Landing (2025) did not consider the genus to be demonstrably monophyletic, and considered it to be a possible synonym of Balticoglaucus.	
Branikarges? nodifrons	Sp. nov	Valid	Alberti	Devonian	Rupbach Shale	Germany	A member of the family Lichidae.	
Bromella utahensis	Sp. nov	Valid	Sundberg, Cothren & Dehler	Cambrian	Nounan Formation	United States (Utah)	A member of the family Aphelaspididae.	
Bruthansovaspis	Gen. et comb. nov	Valid	Van Viersen	Silurian	Motol Formation	Czech Republic	A member of the family Odontopleuridae. The type species is "Acidaspis" roemeri Barrande (1852); genus also includes "Odontopleura" dormitzeri Hawle & Corda (1847) and "Odontopleura" dumortieri Hawle & Corda (1847).	
Cambrodaimona	Gen. et sp. nov	Valid	Geyer	Cambrian (Wuliuan)	Tannenknock Formation	Germany	A member of Ptychopariida belonging to the group Ptychopariacea. The type species is C. parablepta.	
Cambrophatictor meieri	Sp. nov	Valid	Geyer	Cambrian (Wuliuan)	Tannenknock Formation	Germany	A member of Ptychopariida belonging to the group Ptychopariacea.	
Ceratocephala horrida	Sp. nov	Valid	Alberti	Devonian	Rupbach Shale	Germany	A member of the family Odontopleuridae.	
Charybdaspis steinsbergensis	Sp. nov	Valid	Alberti	Devonian	Rupbach Shale	Germany	A member of the family Odontopleuridae.	
Courtessolia	Gen. et comb. et sp. nov	Valid	Geyer	Cambrian	Coulouma Formation	France; Morocco; Spain	A member of the family Conocoryphidae. The type species is "Conocoryphe" levyi Munier-Chalmas & Bergeron in Bergeron (1889); genus also includes "Bailiella levyi" bondoni Termier & Termier (1950), "Bailiella" griffei Courtessole (1967), "Bailiella" meridiana Sdzuy (1958), "Bailiella" seguieri Courtessole (1973), "Bailiella" sepulcra Álvaro & Vizcaïno (2018), "Bailiella" souchoni Courtessole (1967), as well as new species C. lemdadensis.	
Dawsonia densiserrata	Sp. nov	Valid	Geyer	Cambrian (Wuliuan)	Tannenknock Formation	Germany	A member of the family Eodiscidae, placed by Geyer (2024) within Trilobita rather than Agnostida.	
Emarginobailiella	Gen. et comb. nov	Valid	Geyer	Cambrian	Alum Shale Formation	Denmark; Sweden; United Kingdom	A member of the family Conocoryphidae. The type species is "Conocoryphe" emarginata Linnarsson (1877); genus also includes "Bailiella" cobboldi Resser (1936), "Bailiella" comleyensis Resser (1936), "Bailiella" froeensis Westergård (1950), "Conocoryphe" impressa Linnarsson (1879), "Conocoryphe emarginata" var. longifrons Cobbold (1911), "Conocoryphe" lyelli Hicks (1871) and "Conocoryphe" tenuicincta Linnarsson (1879).	
Eskoharpes sicarius	Sp. nov	Valid	Johnson	Devonian	Achguig Group	Morocco	A member of Harpetida belonging to the family Harpetidae.	
Exapinepiphania	Nom. et comb. et sp. nov	Valid	Geyer	Cambrian		Canada; China; Czech Republic; Germany; Morocco; Sweden	A member of the family Solenopleuridae; a replacement name for Herse Hawle & Corda (1847). The type species is "Herse" neubergi Hawle & Corda (1847); genus also includes "Parasolenopleura" parabolica Geyer (2017), "Parasolenopleura" wurmi Geyer (2017), "Parasolenopleura" lemdadensis Geyer (1998), "Solenopleura" cristata Linnarsson (1877), "Bathyurus" gregarius Billings (1865) and "Solenopleura" pauperata Walcott (1906), as well as new species E. marionae.	
Flexicalymene trentonensis	Sp. nov	Valid	Hopkins & Martin	Ordovician	Neuville Formation	Canada (Quebec); United States (New York)		
Fritchaspis edgecombei	Sp. nov	Valid	Johnson	Devonian	Er Remlia Formation	Morocco	A member of Harpetida belonging to the family Harpetidae.	
Globampyx sexsegmentatus	Sp. nov	Valid	Fortey, Vargas-Parra & Droser	Ordovician	Al Rose Formation	United States (California)	A member of the family Raphiophoridae.	
Harpes boudibensis	Sp. nov	Valid	Johnson	Devonian	El Otfal Formation	Morocco	A member of Harpetida belonging to the family Harpetidae.	
Harpes lahceni	Sp. nov	Valid	Johnson	Devonian	El Otfal Formation	Morocco	A member of Harpetida belonging to the family Harpetidae.	
Harpes lentigo	Sp. nov	Valid	Johnson	Devonian	Tazoulait Formation	Morocco	A member of Harpetida belonging to the family Harpetidae.	
Harpes oudris	Sp. nov	Valid	Johnson	Devonian	El Otfal Formation	Morocco	A member of Harpetida belonging to the family Harpetidae.	
Harpes prescheri	Sp. nov	Valid	Johnson	Devonian	Er Remlia Formation	Morocco	A member of Harpetida belonging to the family Harpetidae.	
Harpes sphenocephalus	Sp. nov	Valid	Johnson	Devonian	Er Remlia Formation	Morocco	A member of Harpetida belonging to the family Harpetidae.	
Harpes supercilium	Sp. nov	Valid	Johnson	Devonian	El Otfal Formation	Morocco	A member of Harpetida belonging to the family Harpetidae.	
Helioharpes aougili	Sp. nov	Valid	Johnson	Devonian		Morocco	A member of Harpetida belonging to the family Harpetidae.	
Isoprusia? monikae	Sp. nov	Valid	Alberti	Devonian	Rupbach Shale	Germany	A member of the family Odontopleuridae.	
Kettneraspis freitagi	Sp. nov	Valid	Van Viersen	Devonian		Morocco	A member of the family Odontopleuridae.	
Kielania tumula	Sp. nov	Valid	Johnson	Devonian	Ihandar Formation	Morocco	A member of Harpetida belonging to the family Harpetidae.	
Kingaspidoides epimetheus	Sp. nov	Valid	Geyer	Cambrian	Tannenknock Formation	Germany	A member of the family Ellipsocephalidae.	
Kingaspidoides wildensteinensis	Sp. nov	Valid	Geyer	Cambrian (Wuliuan)	Tannenknock Formation	Germany	A member of the family Ellipsocephalidae.	
Kingaspis dolosus	Sp. nov	Valid	Geyer	Cambrian (Wuliuan)	Tannenknock Formation	Germany	A member of the family Ellipsocephalidae.	
Kingstonia smithfieldensis	Sp. nov	Valid	Sundberg, Cothren & Dehler	Cambrian	Nounan Formation	United States (Utah)	A member of the family Kingstoniidae.	
Koneprusia dieterottoi	Sp. nov	Valid	Alberti	Devonian	Rupbach Shale	Germany	A member of the family Odontopleuridae.	
Latikingaspis tenuis	Sp. nov	Valid	Geyer	Cambrian (Wuliuan)	Tannenknock Formation	Germany	A member of the family Ellipsocephalidae.	
Linguaphillipsia buchuensis	Sp. nov		Tang et al.	Carboniferous		Malaysia		
Lioharpes ammari	Sp. nov	Valid	Johnson	Devonian	Tazoulait Formation	Morocco	A member of Harpetida belonging to the family Harpetidae.	
Lioharpes galea	Sp. nov	Valid	Johnson	Devonian	Ihandar Formation	Morocco	A member of Harpetida belonging to the family Harpetidae.	
Lioharpes morocconensis	Sp. nov	Valid	Johnson	Devonian	Boutiskaouine Formation	Morocco	A member of Harpetida belonging to the family Harpetidae.	
Lioharpes saredra	Sp. nov	Valid	Johnson	Devonian	Probably Boutiskaouine Formation	Morocco	A member of Harpetida belonging to the family Harpetidae.	
Lioharpes scopulum	Sp. nov	Valid	Johnson	Devonian	Probably Ihandar Formation	Morocco	A member of Harpetida belonging to the family Harpetidae.	
Macropyge (Promacropyge) sahensis	Sp. nov	Valid	Ghobadi Pour, Popov & Kebria-ee Zadeh	Cambrian (Furongian)	Mila Formation	Iran	A member of Asaphida belonging to the family Ceratopygidae.	
Maghroharpes	Gen. et 9 sp. et comb. nov	Valid	Johnson	Devonian (Pragian to Emsian)	Ihandar Formation	Czech Republic; France; Morocco	A member of Harpetida belonging to the family Harpetidae. The types species is M. hammii; genus also includes new species M. azmamarensis, M. forteyi, M. ihmadii, M. laatchanensis, M. minutipunctus, M. oufatenensis, M. terridus and M. zguidensis, as well as "Harpes" rouvillei Frech (1887) and "Harpes" sculptus Hawle & Corda (1847).	
Niobella darvarensis	Sp. nov	Valid	Ghobadi Pour, Popov & Kebria-ee Zadeh	Cambrian (Furongian)	Mila Formation	Iran	A member of Asaphida belonging to the family Asaphidae.	
Olenellus santuccii	Sp. nov	Valid	Webster in Webster & Caron	Cambrian Stage 4	Eager Formation	Canada (British Columbia)	A member of the family Olenellidae.	
Otarion (Otarion) bucculentum	Sp. nov	Valid	Flick & Flick	Devonian		Germany	A member of Proetida belonging to the family Aulacopleuridae.	
Otarionella givetica	Sp. nov	Valid	Flick & Flick	Devonian		Germany	A member of Proetida belonging to the family Aulacopleuridae.	
Paraaulacopleura beyrichi greifensteinensis	Ssp. nov	Valid	Flick	Devonian		Germany	A member of Proetida belonging to the family Aulacopleuridae.	
Paraaulacopleura desculpens	Sp. nov	Valid	Flick	Devonian		Germany	A member of Proetida belonging to the family Aulacopleuridae.	
Perunaspis angulatospina	Sp. nov	Valid	Alberti	Devonian	Rupbach Shale	Germany	A member of the family Lichidae.	
Pinnuloharpes	Gen. et 8 sp. et comb. nov	Valid	Johnson	Devonian (Emsian to Eifelian)	El Otfal Formation	Morocco; Germany?	A member of Harpetida belonging to the family Harpetidae. The types species is P. segaouii; genus also includes new species P. apteros, P. chaperon, P. hannabouensis, P. haustrum, P. igaouii, P. merzaneensis and P. torquis, as well as "Harpes" hamarlaghdadensis Crônier et al. (2018) and probably also "Harpes" fornicatus Novák (1890) and "Harpes" pygmaeus Lütke (1965).	
Prioscutarius	Gen. et comb. et 2 sp. nov	Valid	Geyer	Cambrian	Jbel Wawrmast Formation	Germany; Morocco	A member of the family Conocoryphidae. The type species is "Bailiella" dilatata Geyer (1998); genus also includes new species P. max and P. moritz.	
Protolenus undulatus	Sp. nov	Valid	Geyer	Cambrian (Wuliuan)	Tannenknock Formation	Germany	A member of the family Ellipsocephalidae.	
Protopresbynileus divergens	Sp. nov	Valid	Fortey, Vargas-Parra & Droser	Ordovician	Al Rose Formation	United States (California)	A member of the family Nileidae.	
Solenopleura westergaardi	Nom. nov	Valid	Geyer	Cambrian	Andrarum Limestone Bed	Sweden	A member of the family Solenopleuridae; a replacement name for Solenopleura conifrons Westergård (1953).	
Staurocephalus oliveae	Sp. nov	Valid	Leidi et al.	Ordovician (Katian)	Sholeshook Limestone	United Kingdom	A member of the family Encrinuridae.	
Stoloharpes	Gen. et 4 sp. et comb. nov	Valid	Johnson	Devonian (Lochkovian to Eifelian)		Czech Republic; Morocco	A member of Harpetida belonging to the family Harpetidae. The types species is S. rissaniensis; genus also includes new species S. calceolus, S. capricornus and S. retiarius, as well as "Kielania" obuti Pribyl & Vanek (1986) and "Harpes" convexus Hawle & Corda (1847).	
Termierella totanesensis	Sp. nov	Valid	Sepúlveda et al.	Cambrian Stage 4	Soleras Formation	Spain	A member of Redlichiida belonging to the group Ellipsocephaloidea and the family Ellipsocephalidae.	
Timsaloproetus xenos	Sp. nov	Valid	Van Viersen & Müller	Devonian (Emsian)		Luxembourg	A member of the family Proetidae.	
Triarthrus novoaustralis	Sp. nov	Valid	Smith et al.	Ordovician (Katian)	Malachis Hill Formation	Australia	A member of Ptychopariida belonging to the family Olenidae	
Ulugtella? biformis	Sp. nov	Valid	Pereira, Rábano & Gutiérrez-Marco	Ordovician (Katian)		Morocco		
Wanneria cranbrookense	Sp. nov	Valid	Webster in Webster & Caron	Cambrian Stage 4	Eager Formation	Canada (British Columbia)	A member of Olenelloidea belonging to the family Wanneriidae.	
Waukeshaaspis	Gen. et sp. nov	Valid	Randolfe & Gass	Silurian (Telychian)	Brandon Bridge Formation	United States (Wisconsin)	A member of the family Dalmanitidae. The type species is W. eatonae.	

=== Trilobite research ===
- Drage (2024) finds evidence of only minor differences in morphometry between trilobites displaying different modes of moulting.
- Trilobite fossil material from the Tiout section in Morocco, representing the first occurrence of trilobites in West Gondwana and some of the oldest trilobite fossils in general, is determined to be approximately 519.62-million-years-old by Sinnesael, Millard & Smith (2024).
- El Albani et al. (2024) report the discovery of exceptionally preserved trilobite specimens from the Cambrian Tatelt Formation (Morocco) fossilized through rapid ash burial caused by underwater pyroclastic flow, providing new information on the trilobite anatomy.
- A study on the growth and development of Sahtuia carcajouensis and Mackenzieaspis parallelispinosa from the Cambrian Mount Cap Formation (Canada) is published by Handkamer & Pratt (2024), who report evidence of decrease in the number of episodes of segment release in both taxa, possibly as a result of local environmental conditions.
- Singla et al. (2024) demarcate the stratigraphic thickness of the Oryctocephalus salteri biozone in the Cambrian (Wuliuan) Parahio Member of the Kunzam La Formation in the Spiti region, preserving diverse trilobite fossils, and correlate the O. salteri biozone of the Kunzam La Formation with the Tonkinella-Hundwarella bearing level of the Nutunus Formation in the Kashmir region.
- Evidence interpreted as indicative of a direct link between the spread of low-oxygen conditions in shallow-water settings and the turnover of trilobites from the North China Platform during the Steptoean positive carbon isotope excursion is presented by Yang et al. (2024).
- A study on the affinities of harpetid and trinucleioid trilobites is published by Beech, Bottjer & Smith (2024), who argue that the body plan with a wide, flattened cephalic brim or fringe evolved independently in the two groups, and interpret trinucleids as likely specialized asaphids.
- Evidence from the study of soft-bodied specimens of Olenoides serratus and Triarthrus eatoni, interpreted as indicating that trilobites had five pairs of cephalic appendages, is presented by Hou & Hopkins (2024).
- Hopkins, Gutiérrez-Marco & Di Silvestro (2024) describe fossil material of Leptoplastides salteri from the Fezouata Formation (Morocco), extending known range of this species from Avalonia into Gondwana.
- Losso & Ortega-Hernández (2024) describe the appendages of Ceraurus pleurexanthemus and Flexicalymene senaria from the Walcott–Rust quarry (New York, United States) and report close morphological similarity of the exopodite structure in C. pleurexanthemus and Anacheirurus adserai in spite of the two species living in different environments and being separated by 20 million years.
- Specimens of Dalmanitina socialis preserved with remains of the alimentary tract are described from the Ordovician Letná Formation (Czech Republic) by Fatka, Budil & Mikuláš (2024).
- Bicknell et al. (2024) describe a specimen of Toxochasmops vormsiensis from the Katian Kõrgessaare Formation (Estonia) preserved molted within the body chamber of a nautiloid cephalopod Gorbyoceras textumaraneum, representing the first known record of cryptic molting of pterygometopid trilobites.
- Evidence indicating that two peaks of in trilobite cephalic shape diversity in the Ordovician and the Devonian were caused by different underlying mechanisms is presented by Drage & Pates (2024).
- A study on the biogeography of Cheirurina during the Ordovician is published by Pérez-Peris, Adrain & Daley (2024).
- Bicknell, Smith & Miller-Camp (2024) and Bicknell, Smith & Hopkins (2024) revise the record of trilobite specimens with malformations from the collections of the Indiana University and the American Museum of Natural History.
- A study on the phylogenetic relationships of cheirurine, deiphonine and "cyrtometopine" cheirurids is published by Pérez-Peris, Adrain & Daley (2024).

== Other arthropods ==
Name	Novelty	Status	Authors	Age	Type locality	Country	Notes	Images
Ankitokazocaris lariensis	Sp. nov	Valid	Ji & Tintori	Middle Triassic (Ladinian)	Buchenstein Formation	Italy	A thylacocephalan.	
Atropicaris lintveri	Sp. nov	Valid	Laville et al.	Middle Triassic (Anisian)	Lower Serla Dolomite Formation	Slovenia	A thylacocephalan.	
Heterochordeuma liae	Sp. nov	Valid	Su, Cai & Huang	Cretaceous (Albian-Cenomanian)	Burmese amber	Myanmar	A millipede belonging to the family Heterochordeumatidae.	
Kamnikaris	Gen. et sp. nov	Valid	Laville et al.	Middle Triassic (Anisian)	Strelovec Formation	Slovenia	A thylacocephalan. The type species is K. cemazevkaensis.	
Lomankus	Gen. et sp. nov	Valid	Pary et al.	Upper Ordovician (Katian)	Beecher’s Trilobite Beds	United States (New York)	A late surviving member of the Megacheira belonging to the family Leanchoiliidae. The type species is L. edgecombei.	
Lotagnostus clarki	Sp. nov	Valid	Taylor, Loch & Repetski	Cambrian (Furongian)	Windfall Formation	United States (Nevada)	A member of Agnostida belonging to the family Agnostidae.	
Lotagnostus morrisoni	Sp. nov	Valid	Taylor, Loch & Repetski	Cambrian (Furongian)	Windfall Formation	United States (Nevada)	A member of Agnostida belonging to the family Agnostidae.	
Lotagnostus nolani	Sp. nov	Valid	Taylor, Loch & Repetski	Cambrian (Furongian)	Windfall Formation	United States (Nevada)	A member of Agnostida belonging to the family Agnostidae.	
Lotagnostus rushtoni	Sp. nov	Valid	Taylor, Loch & Repetski	Cambrian (Furongian)	Windfall Formation	United States (Nevada)	A member of Agnostida belonging to the family Agnostidae.	
Microcaris ajdovskae	Sp. nov	Valid	Laville et al.	Late Triassic (Carnian)	Martuljek Limestone Formation	Slovenia	A thylacocephalan.	
Neoagnostus parki	Sp. nov	Valid	Taylor, Loch & Repetski	Cambrian (Furongian)	Windfall Formation	United States (Nevada)	A member of Agnostida belonging to the family Diplagnostidae.	
Paracalodiscus	Gen. et comb. nov	Valid	Korovnikov & Bushuev	Cambrian	Brigus Formation	Canada; Russia	A member of Agnostida belonging to the family Weymouthiidae. The type species is "Microdiscus" helena Walcott (1889); genus also includes "Calodiscus" granulosus Egorova & Shabanov (1972).	
Paraostenia striata	Comb. nov	Valid	(Glaessner)	Late Triassic (Carnian)	Polzberg Lagerstätte	Austria	A thylacocephalan; moved from Austriocaris striata Glaessner (1931).	
Parisicaris naoyai	Sp. nov	Valid	Ehiro & Kano	Early Triassic (Olenekian)	Osawa Formation	Japan	A thylacocephalan belonging to the family Microcarididae.	
Pectocaris paraspatiosa	Sp. nov	Valid	Jin et al.	Cambrian Stage 3	Hongjingshao Formation	China	A hymenocarine belonging to the pectocarididae family.	
Siphonorhinus globosus	Sp. nov	Valid	Su, Cai & Huang	Cretaceous (Albian to Cenomanian)	Burmese amber	Myanmar	A millipede belonging to the family Siphonorhinidae.	
Siphonorhinus peculiaris	Sp. nov	Valid	Su, Cai & Huang	Cretaceous (Albian to Cenomanian)	Burmese amber	Myanmar	A millipede belonging to the family Siphonorhinidae.	
Stoppanicaris	Gen. et sp. nov	Valid	Ji & Tintori	Middle Triassic (Ladinian)	Buchenstein Formation	Italy	A thylacocephalan. The type species is S. grignaensis.	
Tomagnostella tullbergi	Sp. nov	Valid	Weidner, Nielsen & Ebbestad	Cambrian (Guzhangian)		Norway; Sweden	A member of Agnostida.	
Youti	Gen. et sp. nov	Valid	Smith et al.	Cambrian Stage 3	Yu'anshan Formation	China	A member of the lower stem group of Euarthropoda. The type species is Y. yuanshi.	

- A study on the morphological diversity of carapaces of bradoriids is published by Cox & Pates (2024).
- O'Flynn et al. (2024) describe new fossil material of Bushizheia yangi from the Cambrian Chengjiang Lagerstätte (China), providing new information on its head morphology, and interpret the studied specimens as supporting the interpretation of a six-segmented head as an ancestral state for Deuteropoda.
- Redescription and a study on the affinities of Urokodia aequalis is published by Liu et al. (2024), who interpret this arthropod as a basal member of Artiopoda, and interpret its body plan as likely similar to the ancestral body plan for Artiopoda.
- Lin et al. (2024) describe new fossil material of Retifacies abnormalis from the Cambrian Helinpu Formation (Yunnan, China) including large specimens with a carapace ornamentation different from what was previously known, and interpret the reported differences as developing during ontogeny, but don't consider them to indicate sexual dimorphs.
- Li et al. (2024) report evidence of repeated decline of morphological diversity of eodiscids and agnostoids associated with Cambrian extinction events and with the Great Ordovician Biodiversification Event.
- Izquierdo-López & Caron (2024) describe new fossil material of Odaraia alata from the Burgess Shale (Canada), including well-preserved mandibles that can be homologized with those of Cambrian fuxianhuiids and extant mandibulates.
- Braddy (2024) reviews diversity, ichnology, ecology and evolution of euthycarcinoids, and names a new family Apankuridae.
- A study on the anatomy of heads of juvenile specimens of Arthropleura from the Carboniferous Montceau-les-Mines Lagerstätte (France) is published by Lhéritier et al. (2024), who report evidence of the presence of millipede-like trunk tagmosis and centipede-like head characters in Arthropleura, and argue that Arthropleura might be a member of Pectinopoda more closely related to millipedes than to centipedes.
- Le Cadre et al. (2024) describe new centipede specimens from the Cretaceous amber from Myanmar, including a henicopid representing the oldest unambiguous member of the family in the fossil record reported to date.
- Review of the fossil record of millipedes is published by Álvarez-Rodríguez et al. (2024).

== General research ==
- Turner, McLoughlin & Mays (2024) review the known record of plant–arthropod interactions on Early and Middle Triassic fossil leaves from Gondwana, reevaluate known record of the studied interactions in the Australian Middle Triassic Benolong Flora, and argue that concerted investigations can greatly increase the number of plant–arthropod interactions in the studied fossil assemblages.
- Loewen et al. (2024) describe a diverse amber deposit from the Maastrichtian strata from the Big Muddy Badlands (Canada), preserving fossils of representatives of seven arthropod orders and at least 11 insect families, and interpret the studied assemblage as providing evidence of a faunal turnover among insects prior to the Cretaceous–Paleogene extinction event.
