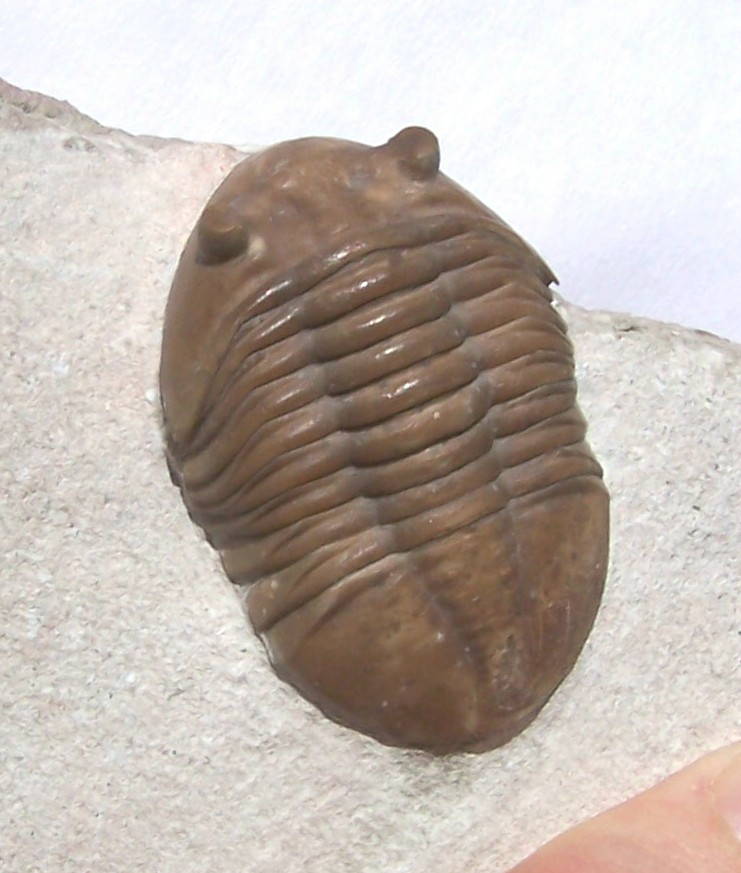
- Asaphus lepidurus

Scientific classification
- Kingdom: Animalia
- Phylum: Arthropoda
- Clade: †Artiopoda
- Class: †Trilobita
- Subclass: †Librostoma; Fortey, 1990

Orders
- †Asaphida; †Harpetida; †Phacopida? (Note: Two primitive calymenines, (Pharostomina and Bavarilla), had natant hypostomes, suggesting that the Cambrian sister taxon is likely also natant, making them Librostomes.); †Proetida; †Ptychopariida; †Trinucleida?(proposed)

= Librostoma =

Librostoma Temporal range: Cambrian series 2–Lopingian

Extinct subclass of trilobites

Librostoma is a subclass of trilobites defined by having a natant hypostome, which is a hypostome (mineralized trilobite mouthpart) that is free from the anterior doublure and aligned with the anterior of the glabella, this is unlike a conterminant hypostome, which is attached to the exoskeleton.

They are a large and long lasting group, with some of the candidates for the first trilobites being librostomes in the order Ptychopariida; and all post-Devonian (Note: Arguably all Post-Frasnian triobites as phacopids are cladistically included) trilobites being in the order Proetida, who are librostomes.

== Taxonomy ==
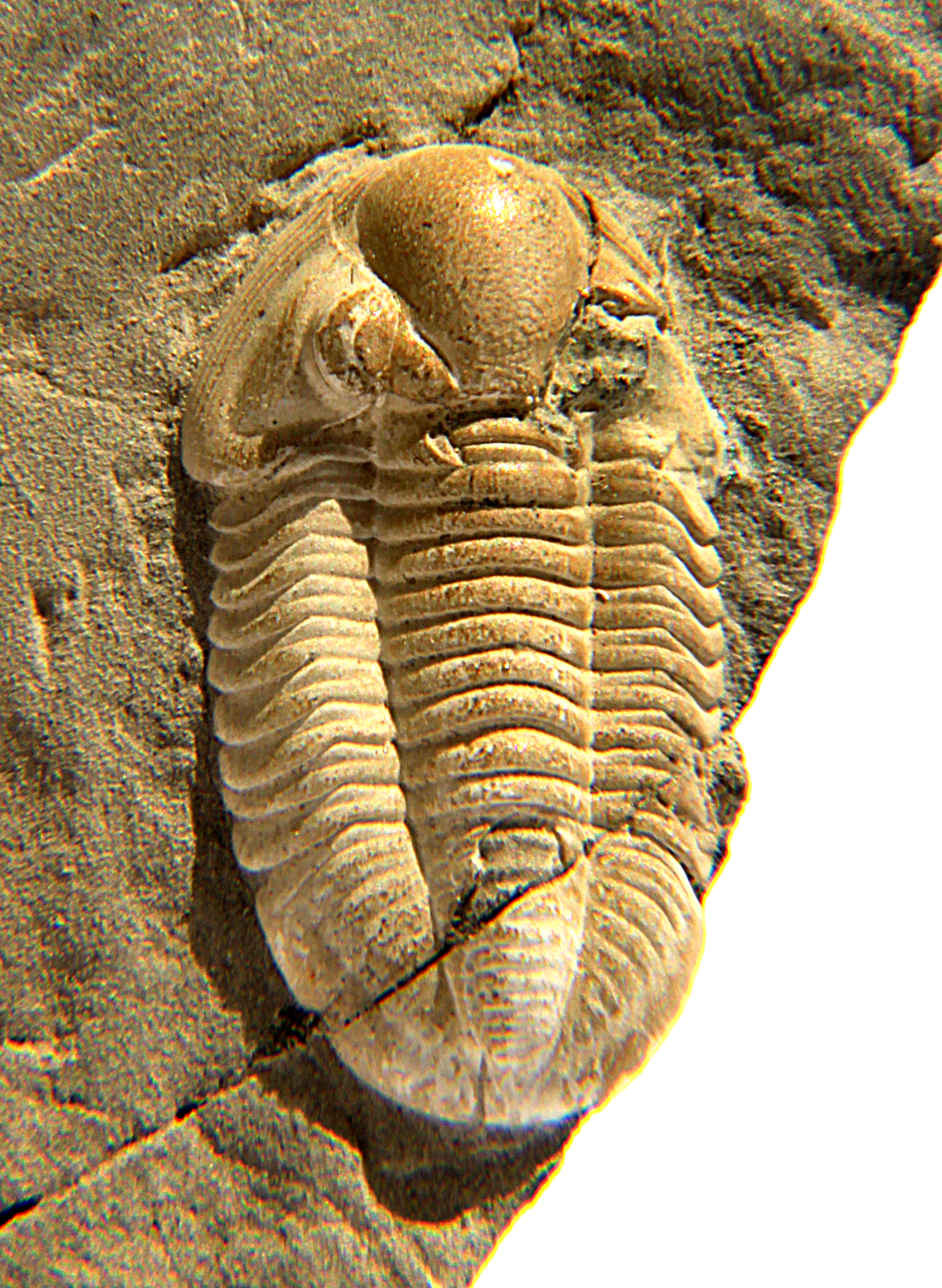
Cummingella belisama, a Phillipsiid Proetid from the Carboniferous.

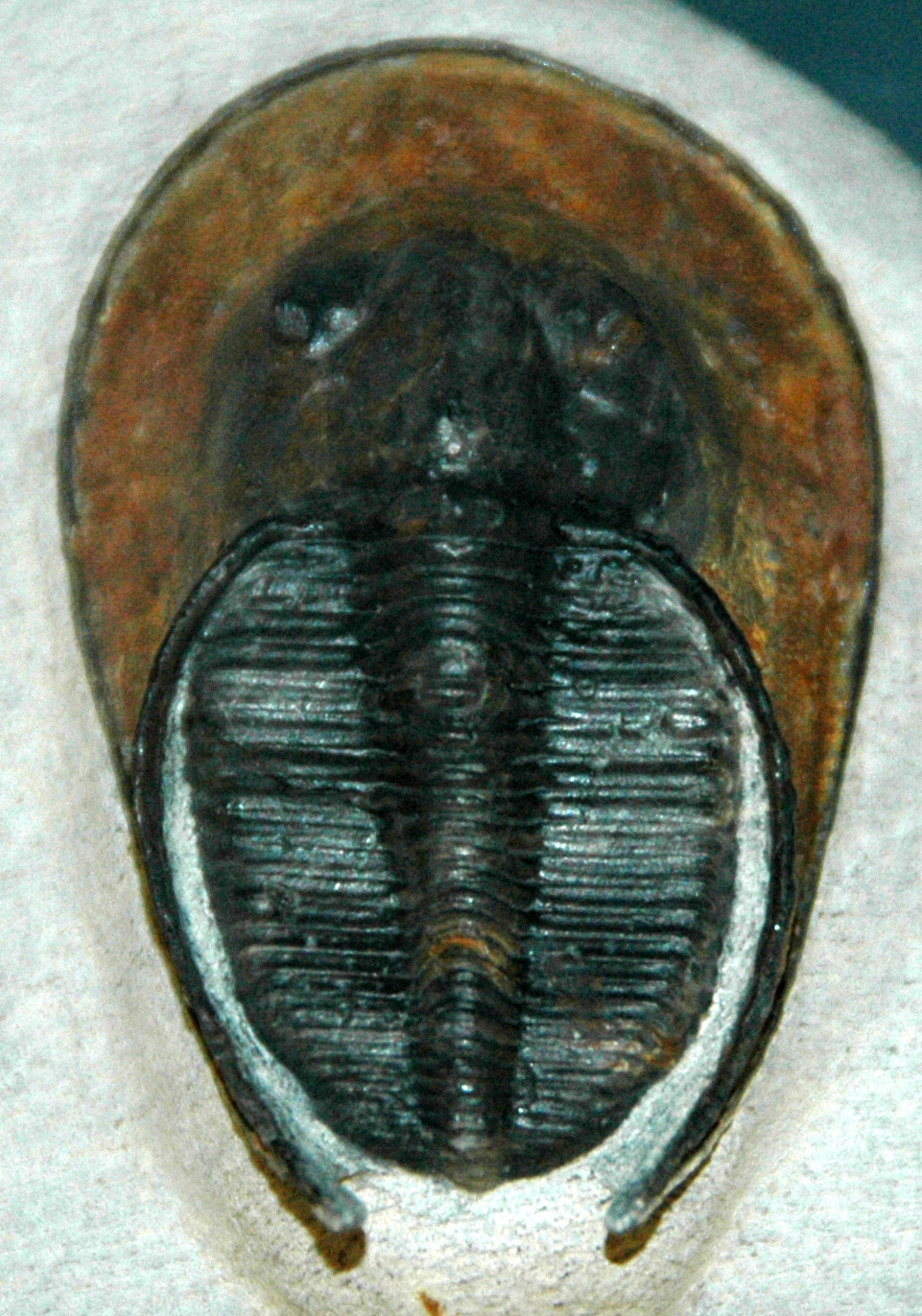
Harpes perridatus, a Harpetid from the Devonian of Morocco.

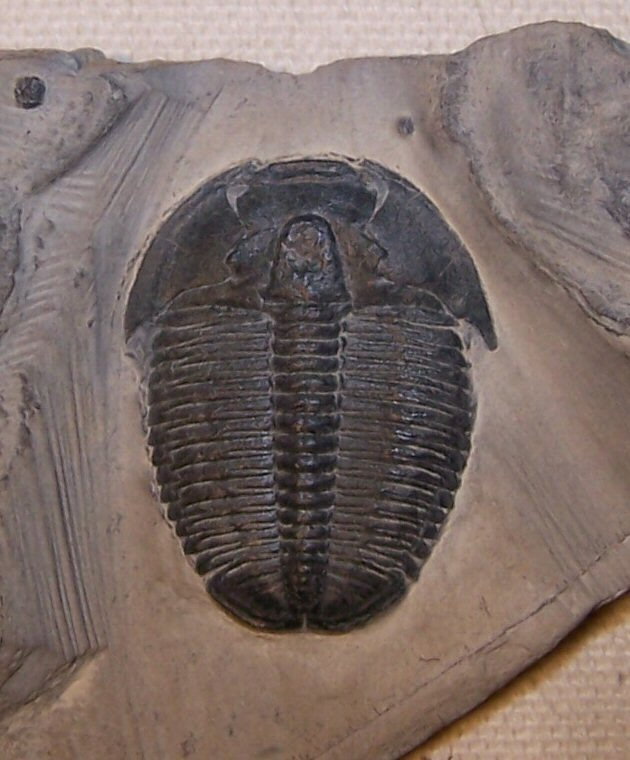
Elrathia kingii, a ptychopariid from the Middle cambrian

Librostomes make up a large component of the Trilobita. Traditionally, four orders are placed in the Librostoma; they are the: Asaphida, Harpetida, Proetida, and Ptychopariida; however, two primitive phacopids (Pharostomina and Bavarilla) have natant hypostomes, indicating that the phacopids are also librostomes. In more recent publications, the asaphid superfamily Trinucleioidea is placed in its own order, Trinucleida, however, even some more recent studies recover them as asaphids.

Some librostomes may not even be within the group, with Whittington (2003) placing some genera (Hemibarrandia, Lakaspis, Peraspis and Symphysurina) of the asaphid family Nileidae in the order Corynexochida.

== Evolution ==
=== Origins ===
The first librostomes were ellipsocephaloid ptychopariids in the family Bigotinidae from the early Cambrian. This group was once thought to be in the order Redlichiida, but are now considered primitive Ptychopariida.

=== Evolutionary history ===
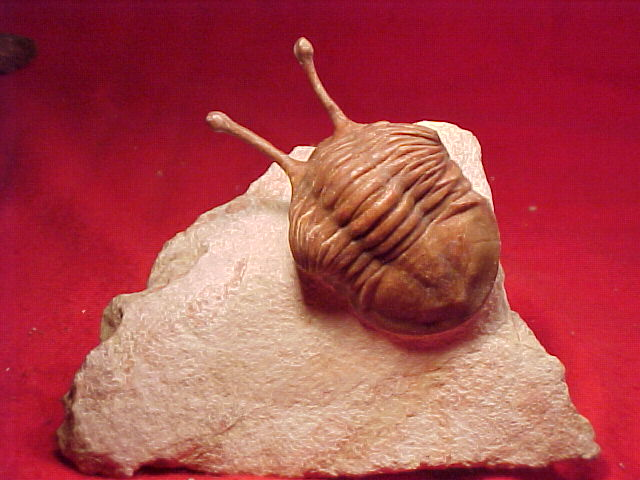
Asaphus kowalewskii from the Ordovician of Russia.

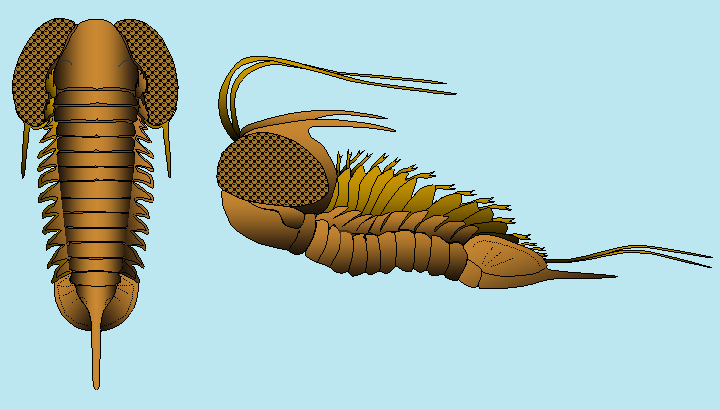
Opipueterella is a genus of swimming trilobite in the family Telephinidae; order Proetida.

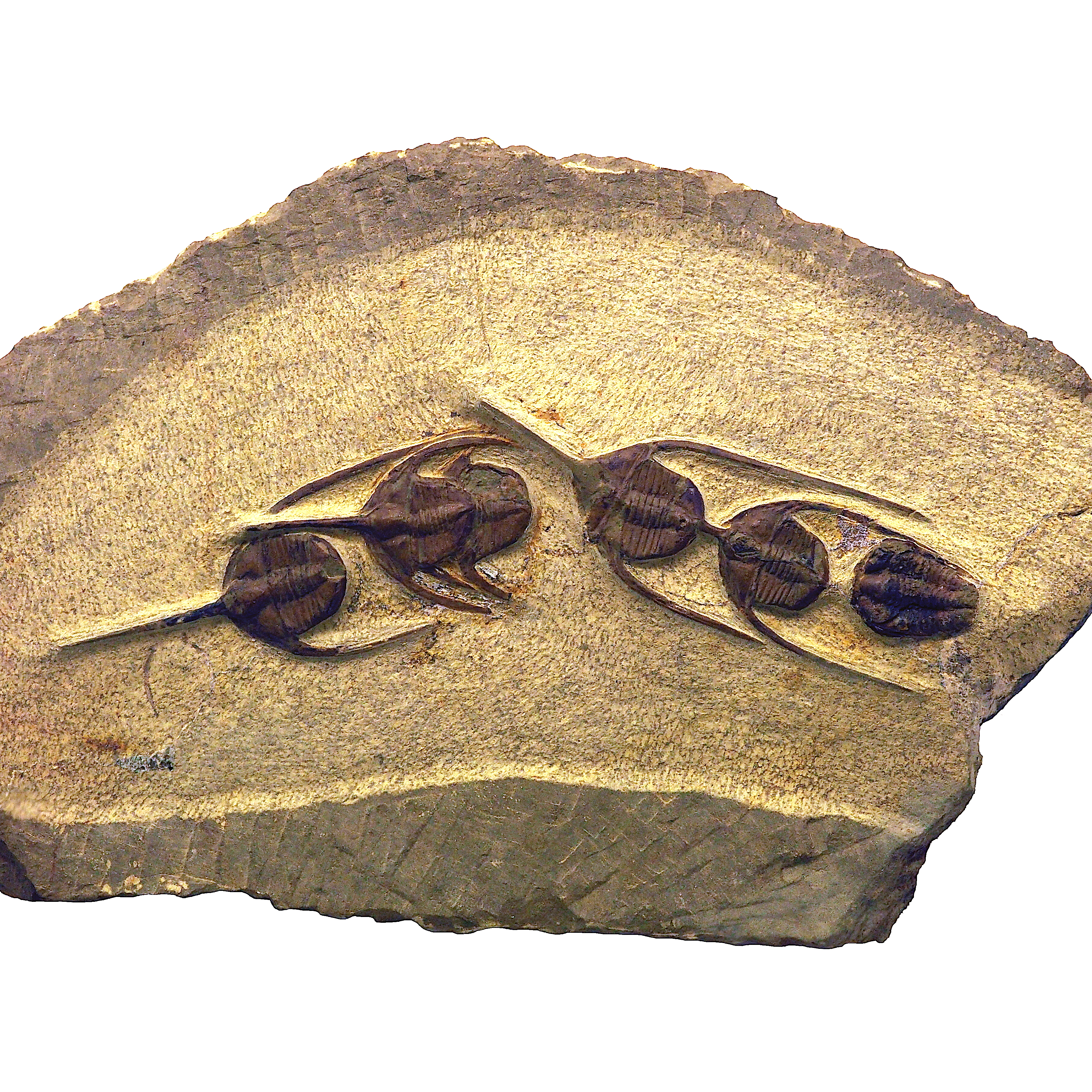
Ampyx, An Ordovician trinucleioid. these trilobites may have gone in single-file lines from deeper water to shallow water at night, mirroring modern Spiny lobsters.

During the Middle Cambrian, the Ptychopariida became the dominant trilobites. Around that time, the Asaphida and Trinucleida would first appear.

The first Harpetida would appear in the Late Cambrian with the primitive genera Baikadamaspis and Entomaspis of the family Entomaspididae.

The first Proetida appeared during the Cambrian-Ordovician transition. Since the earliest Phacopida (which are most likely librostomes) appeared during the early ordovician, it is assumed that a late cambrian sister taxon was present.

During the Ordovician, the Ptychopariida declined. After the decline of the Ptychopariida, the order Asaphida rose to prominence, becoming the dominant order of trilobites by the end of the mid-ordovician.

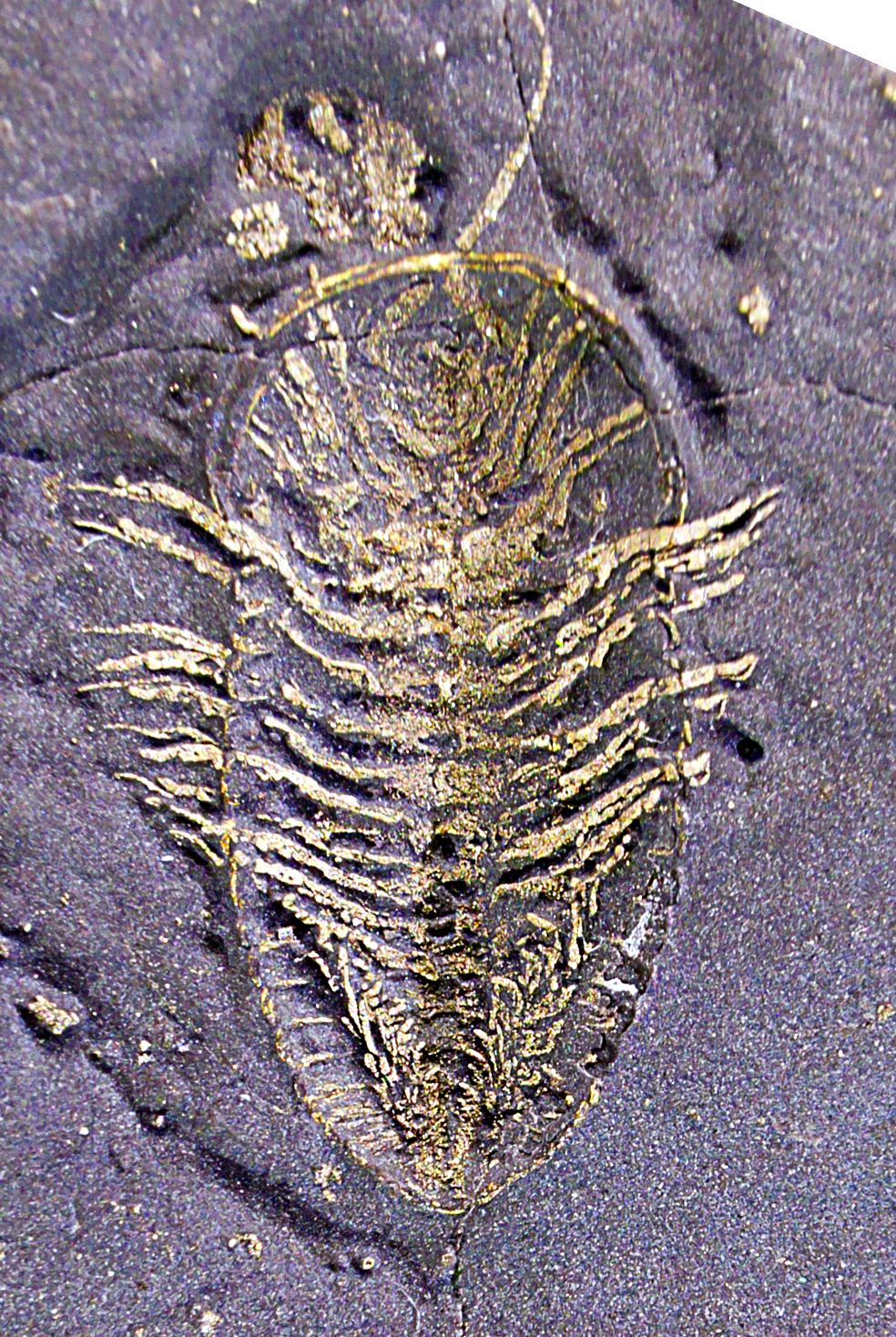
Triarthrus eatoni, one of the last ptychopariids.

The End-Ordovician extinction event would drastically reduce trilobite diversity, with librostomes included. The already endangered Ptychopariida would go extinct. All trilobites with planktonic or nektonic life stages would go extinct, which included the swimming Proetida family Telephinidae, and all asaphids & trinucleids except for the raphiophorid Raphiophorus, which would go extinct shortly after in the Silurian.

== Diversity ==
Librostomes occupied many niches, sizes, and ecologies. Both some of the largest (Ordovician asaphids Isotelus rex, and Hungioides) and smallest trilobites (Ordovician ptychopariid Acanthopleurella stipulae) are librostomes. Many trilobites in the group had some ability to stay above the sea floor, such as asaphids in the superfamilies Cyclopygoidea and Remopleuroidea, proetids in the family Telephinidae, and perhaps some Cheirurid phacopids such as Deiphon and Crotalocephalus.

The Asaphida, Ptychopariida (and Phacopida if included) are some of the most morphologically and taxonomically diverse orders of Trilobites. Meanwhile, the Proetida and Harpetida had a more modest morphological diversity; the former, sometimes referred to as "garden variety trilobites", containing the most diverse family of trilobites in terms of genera, and the latter being more modest in both terms of diversity.

== See also ==
- Agnostida
- Artiopoda
- Trilobita
- Triops
- Redlichiida
