= Hibbertia (trilobite) =

Scientific classification
- Domain: Eukaryota
- Kingdom: Animalia
- Phylum: Arthropoda
- Class: †Trilobita
- Order: †Harpetida
- Family: †Harpetidae
- Genus: †Hibbertia; Jones & Woodward, 1899

Genus of trilobites

Hibbertia is a genus of trilobites. A new species, H. aodiensis, was described from the late Ordovician of China by Dong-Chan Lee in 2012.
