= Kielania =

Kielania Temporal range: Lochkovian–Eifelian

Scientific classification
- Kingdom: Animalia
- Phylum: Arthropoda
- Clade: †Artiopoda
- Class: †Trilobita
- Order: †Harpetida
- Family: †Harpetidae
- Genus: †Kielania; Vaněk, 1963

Species
- K. obuti; K. tumula; K. waageni

Kielania is an extinct genus of harpetid trilobite in the family Harpetidae. It is known from the Early and Middle Devonian. It is possibly related to the dubious genus Globoharpes from the Late Devonian of Australia.
