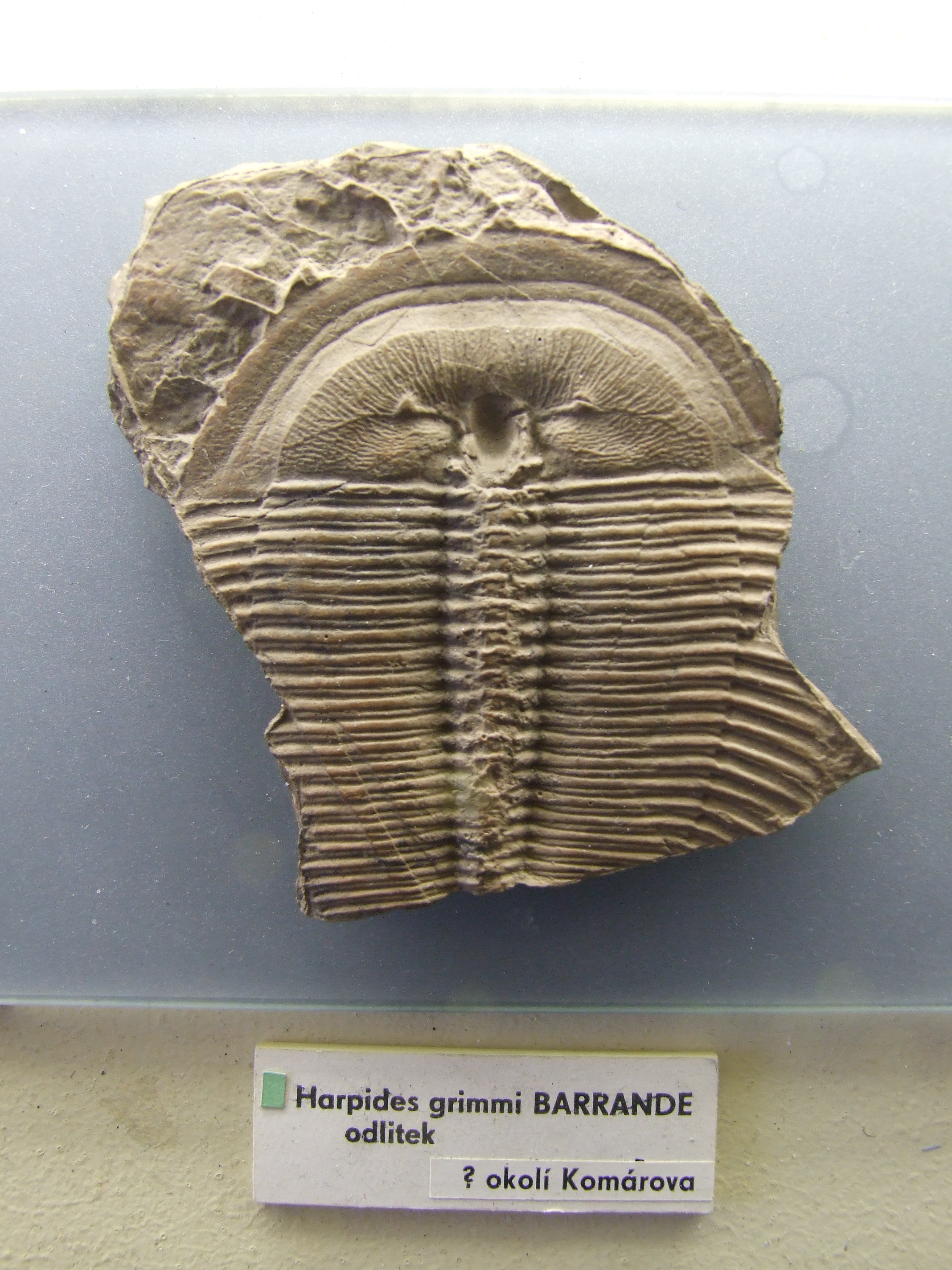
- Harpides grimmi, Czech Republic.

Scientific classification
- Domain: Eukaryota
- Kingdom: Animalia
- Phylum: Arthropoda
- Class: †Trilobita
- Order: †Harpetida
- Family: †Harpididae
- Genus: †Harpides; Beyrich, 1846

Species
- H. breviceps Angelin, 1854; H. grimmi Barrande, 1872; H. plautini Schmidt, 1894; H. rugosus Sars & Boeck, 1838; H. sp.

= Harpides =

Harpides Temporal range: Tremadocian 485.4–477.7 Ma

Extinct genus of trilobites

Harpides is an extinct genus of harpetid trilobite of the family Harpididae.

== Sources ==
- Trilobite info (Sam Gon III)
