= Eskoharpes =

Eskoharpes Temporal range: Frasnian

Scientific classification
- Kingdom: Animalia
- Phylum: Arthropoda
- Clade: †Artiopoda
- Class: †Trilobita
- Order: †Harpetida
- Family: †Harpetidae
- Genus: †Eskoharpes; McNamara, Feist & Ebach, 2009

Genus of Harpetid Trilobite

Eskoharpes is a genus of harpetid trilobites. Along with Globoharpes it is one of the only harpetids that are found from the Frasnian stage of the Devonian period. It most likely evolved from Lioharpes.

== Species ==
All species of Eskoharpes, except for E. neogracilis (Germany and Australia) and E. sicarius (Morocco), are found in the late Frasnian of the Canning Basin in Western Australia.

=== Species ===
- Eskoharpes boltoni
- Eskoharpes guthae
- Eskoharpes neogracilis (=Harpes neogracilis)
- Eskoharpes palanasus (type species)
- Eskoharpes sicarius
- Eskoharpes wandjina
