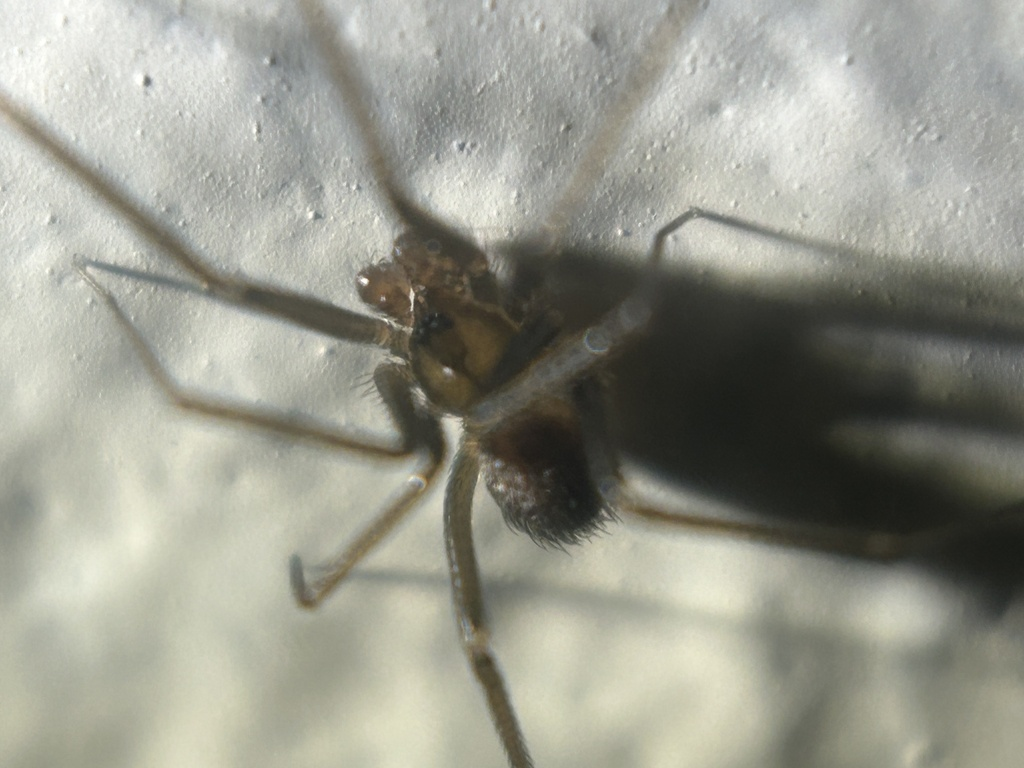

Scientific classification
- Kingdom: Animalia
- Phylum: Arthropoda
- Subphylum: Chelicerata
- Class: Arachnida
- Order: Araneae
- Infraorder: Araneomorphae
- Family: Pholcidae
- Genus: Pholcophora
- Species: P. americana

Binomial name
- Pholcophora americana Banks, 1896

= Pholcophora americana =

Species of spider

Pholcophora americana is a species of cellar spider in the family Pholcidae. It is found in the United States and Canada.
