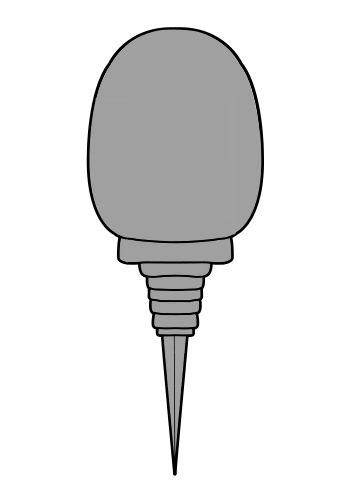
- Diagrammatic reconstruction of T. edgecombei

Scientific classification
- Kingdom: Animalia
- Phylum: Arthropoda
- Subphylum: Chelicerata
- Clade: Euchelicerata
- Class: incertae sedis
- Genus: †Titanoprosoma; Bicknell, Kimmig, Smith & Scherer, 2024
- Species: †T. edgecombei

Binomial name
- †Titanoprosoma edgecombei Bicknell, Kimmig, Smith & Scherer, 2024

= Titanoprosoma =

Titanoprosoma Temporal range: Serpukhovian

Extinct genus of arthropods

Titanoprosoma is an extinct genus of chelicerate with uncertain affinities. The only known species is T. edgecombei, found in the Serpukhovian Bear Gulch Limestone in Montana.

== Discovery and naming ==
T. edgecombei is only known from its holotype. This specimen was discovered in the Bear Gulch Limestone in Fergus County, Montana and dates back to the Serpukhovian stage of the Carboniferous. It was collected by commercial collectors and sold in 1995 to the State Museum of Natural History Karlsruhe, Germany. The Bear Gulch Limestone is a Plattenkalk Konservat Lagerstätte. Depending on the study, it is considered a member of the Heath Formation or the Tyler Formation.

The generic name reflects the particularly large size (titan) of the head shield (prosoma). The specific name honors Gregory Edgecombe, a paleontologist specialized in arthropods.

== Description ==
The total body length of the holotype is 38.1 mm. The prosoma is completely preserved. It is 22 mm long and 17.5 mm wide. It is ovate and the dorsal side appears to be entirely structureless (including the lack of dorsal eyes); this is called an effaced prosoma. A prosoma of such size and shape was unknown prior to the discovery of T. edgecombei. The opisthosoma is 8.4 mm long and is composed of seven tergites. The anteriormost is 11.6 mm wide. The next one is much narrower at 6.7 mm. From this tergite, the width tapers smoothly toward the posteriormost one. The telson is 8.4 mm long.

== Affinities ==
The very large size of the prosoma combined with its ovate shape makes T. edgecombei unique among chelicerates. Some examples of fossil chelicerates with ovate to round prosoma include Alanops and Prolimulus. Titanoprosoma is distinct from eurypterids because of the lack of a metasoma. It superficially looks like horseshoe crabs; however, it lacks their typical thoracetron (fused opisthosoma). Chasmataspidids are also excluded because of the lack of buckler-like shape along the opisthoma and the lack of nine postabdominal segments. Titanoprosoma also looks like some synziphosurines, however, it lacks a pretelson and has fewer tergites. Synziphosurines are not known to possess such an ovate prosoma. This shape differentiates Titanoprosoma from the co-occurring chelicerate Anderella. Another possibility is that Titanoprosoma belongs to Aglaspidida. Brachyaglaspis possesses a large head region and few trunk tergites; however, Titanoprosoma does not preserve any evidence of the typical postventral plates. Thus, Titanoprosoma is tentatively assigned to Euchelicerata.
