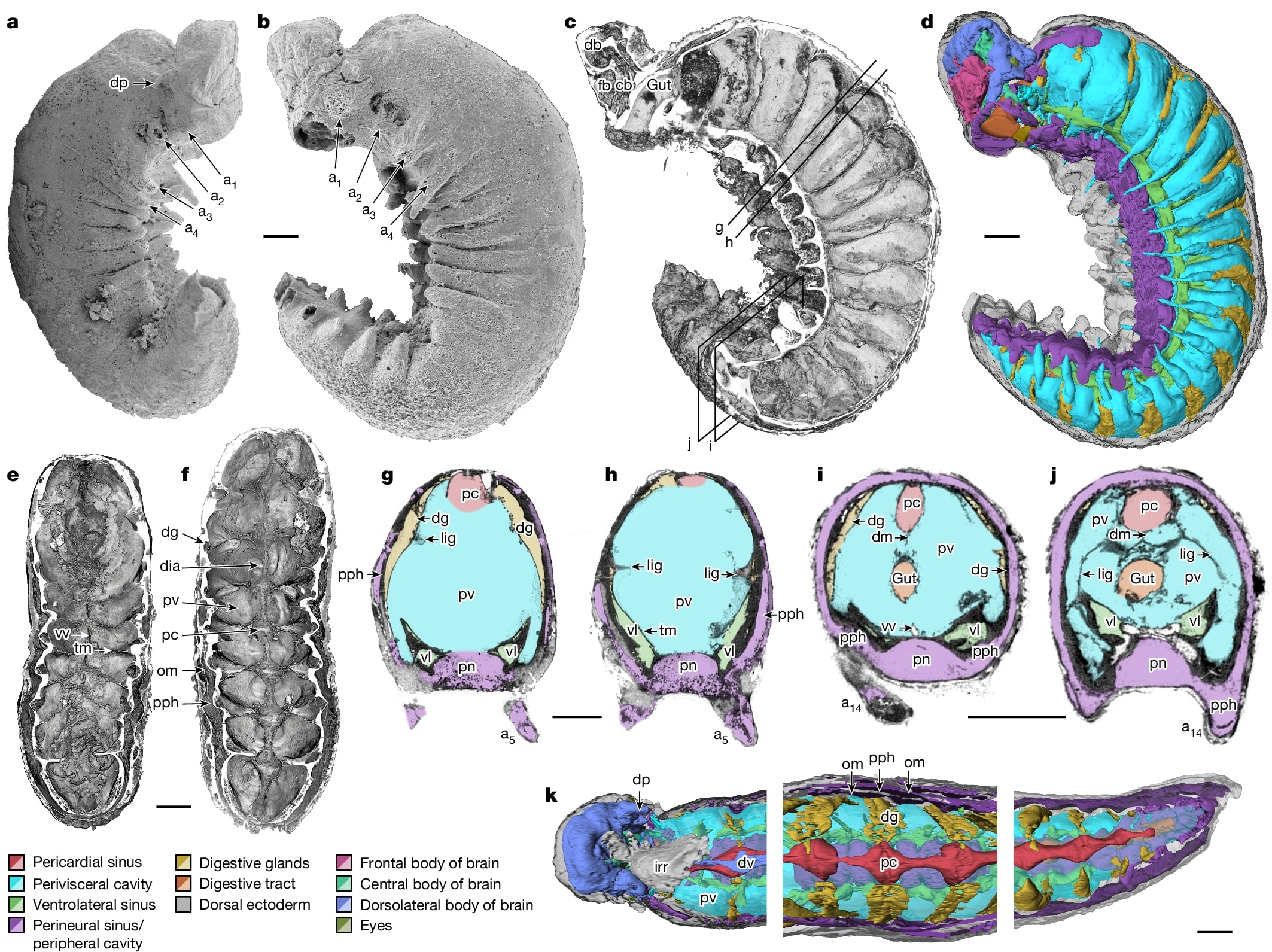
- Anatomy of the holotype

Scientific classification
- Kingdom: Animalia
- Stem group: Arthropoda
- Class: †Dinocaridida
- Genus: †Youti; Smith et al., 2024
- Species: †Y. yuanshi

Binomial name
- †Youti yuanshi Smith et al., 2024

= Youti =

Youti Temporal range: Cambrian Series 2 (Stage 3)

Extinct genus of dinocaridids

Youti (from 幼体, yòutǐ, "larva" in Mandarin Chinese) is an extinct genus of dinocaridid arthropods from the Cambrian Maotianshan Shales of Yunnan Province, China. It was described after using computational approaches to visualize the internal details preserved inside the fossil. The genus contains a single species, Y. yuanshi, known from a larval individual preserved in a carbonate nodule. The internal organs were well-preserved by the fossilization process and it was possible to study the structure using synchrotron scanning electron microscopy and X-ray computed tomography. The specimen shows lobopod legs, and a onychophora-like peripheral haemolymph system. Based on its anatomical characteristics, Smith et al. place the species in the arthropod grade containing Anomalocaris, Opabinia, Pambdelurion and Kerygmachela.
