= Dolichoharpes =

Dolichoharpes Temporal range: 472–450 Ma

Scientific classification
- Kingdom: Animalia
- Phylum: Arthropoda
- Clade: †Artiopoda
- Class: †Trilobita
- Order: †Harpetida
- Family: †Harpetidae
- Genus: †Dolichoharpes; Whittington, 1949

Extinct genus of Trilobite

Dolichoharpes is a genus of harpetid trilobites in the family Harpetidae.
