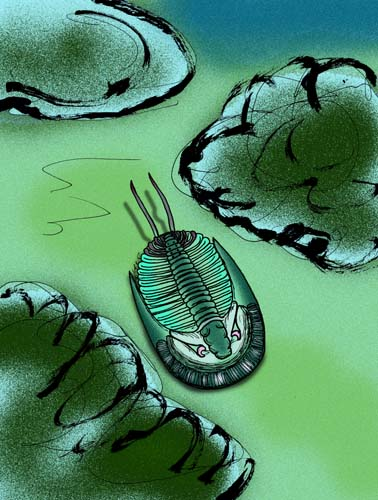
- Entomaspis radiata

Scientific classification
- Kingdom: Animalia
- Phylum: Arthropoda
- Clade: †Artiopoda
- Class: †Trilobita
- Order: †Harpetida
- Family: †Entomaspididae; Ulrich, 1931

Genera
- Baikadamaspis; Entomaspis; ?Hypothetica

= Entomaspididae =

Entomaspididae Temporal range: Late Cambrian–Early Ordovician

Extinct family of trilobites

Entomaspididae is a family of harpetid trilobites that ranges from the Upper Cambrian to Lower Ordovician of marine strata in China and the United States.

== Description ==
Entomaspidids, as in other harpetid trilobites, have proportionally large, vaulted cephalons, shaped like croissants or bonnets, with the cheeks freed to be modified into long and curved spines in Entomaspis and Hypothetica. Although the eyes of Entomaspididae are small compared to many other trilobites, the eyes are large when compared to other harpetids bearing eyes. Entomaspidids can be further distinguished from other harpetids by having a continuous border along the rim of the pygidium composed of small, stub-like spines. In overall appearance, the typical Entomaspidid is a near-circular, medallion-like trilobite.

== Taxonomy ==
Entomaspididae is thought to represent the transition between the ancestral Ptychopariida, and the harpetids. Many researchers question the validity of Entompaspididae as a distinct family, and merge its genera into Harpetidae.

Ulrich erected "Entomaspididae" to contain species of Entomaspis and Hypothetica, from the Latest Cambrian or Earliest Ordovician of Utah.

== Distribution ==
The first entomaspidids appear in the fossil record near the close of the Cambrian period in marine strata of Utah and China. They persist into the Early Ordovician before disappearing from the fossil record.

== Recognized taxa ==
The three genera traditionally placed in Entomaspididae include the type genus, Entomaspis, whose species are found in Utah and Missouri, and Hypothetica, which lived sympatrically with Utah species of Entomaspis, and Baikadamaspis, of Late Cambrian marine strata in China. Many authorities merge Hypothetica into Entomaspis.
