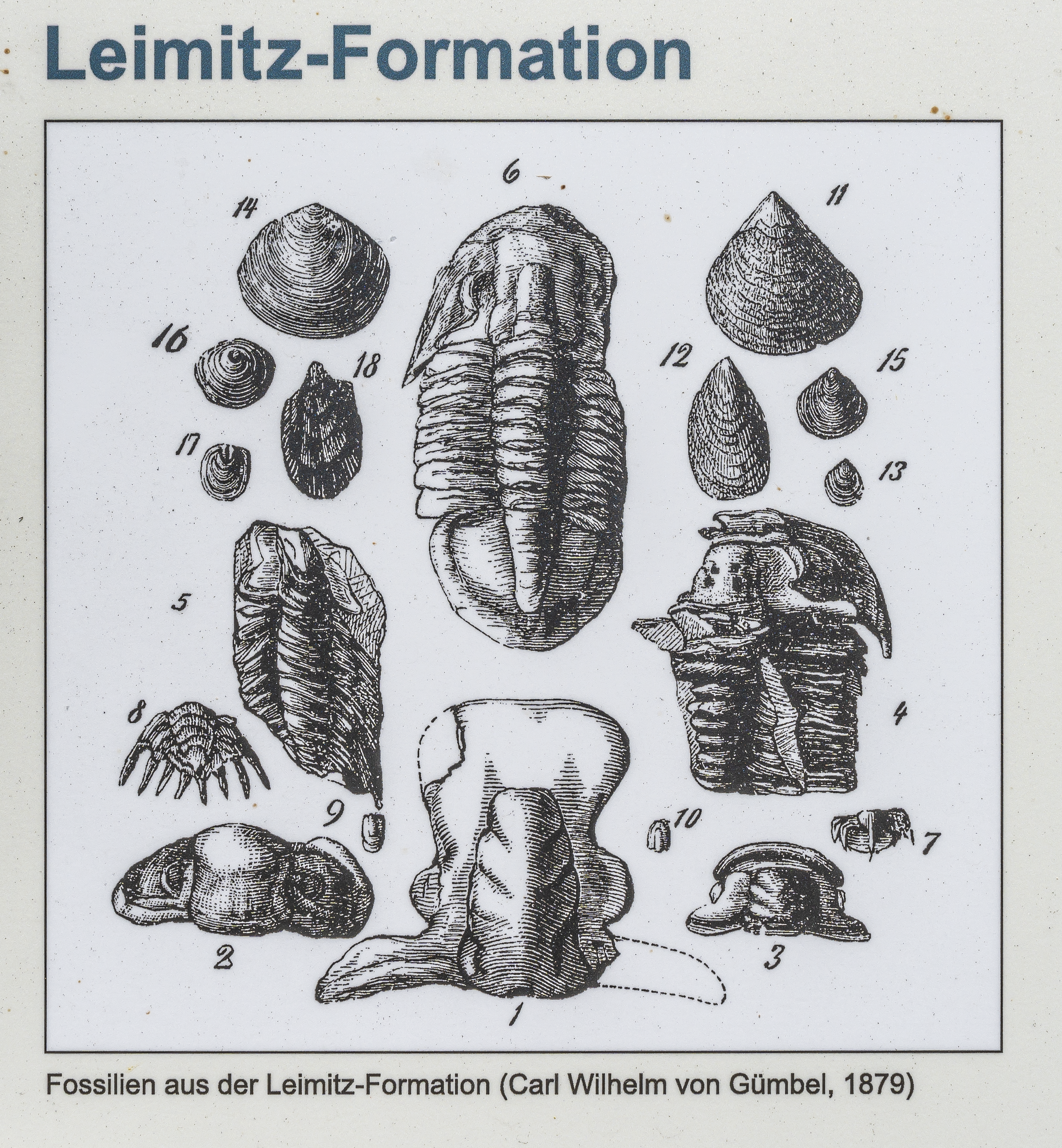
- Image of Bavarilla hofensis, indicated with number 4

Scientific classification
- Kingdom: Animalia
- Phylum: Arthropoda
- Clade: †Artiopoda
- Class: †Trilobita
- Order: †Phacopida
- Family: †Bavarillidae
- Genus: †Bavarilla; Barrande, 1868

= Bavarilla =

Extinct genus of trilobites

Bavarilla is an extinct genus of trilobites.

The species Bavarilla hofensis as bavarilla was found in the 19th century near Hof (Saale) and lived from 485 Ma to 478 Ma in the Paleozoic.
