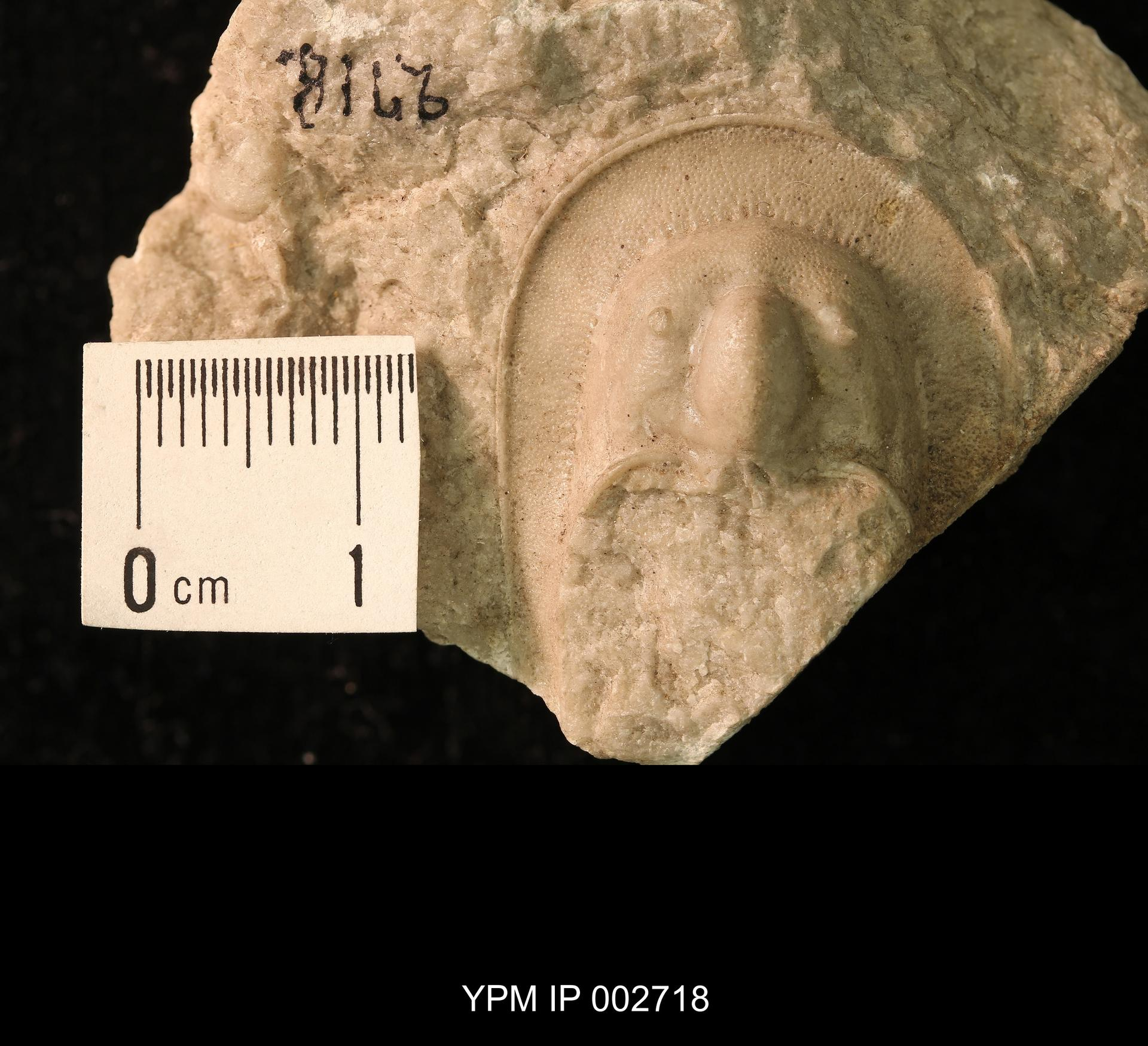
- Lioharpes venulosus

Scientific classification
- Kingdom: Animalia
- Phylum: Arthropoda
- Clade: †Artiopoda
- Class: †Trilobita
- Order: †Harpetida
- Family: †Harpetidae
- Genus: †Lioharpes; Whittington, 1950

= Lioharpes =

Lioharpes Temporal range: Early Devonian–Middle Devonian

Extinct genus of trilobite

Lioharpes is a genus of trilobites in the order Harpetida. The genus Eskoharpes possibly evolved from it. It is synonymous with Fritchapsis.

== Species ==
From the Paleobiology Database.

- L. altaicus
- L. ammari
- L. bischofi
- L. crassimargo
- L. galea
- L. hastatus
- L. montagnei
- L. morocconensis
- L. scopulum
- L. sculptus
- L. vektori
- L. venulosus
