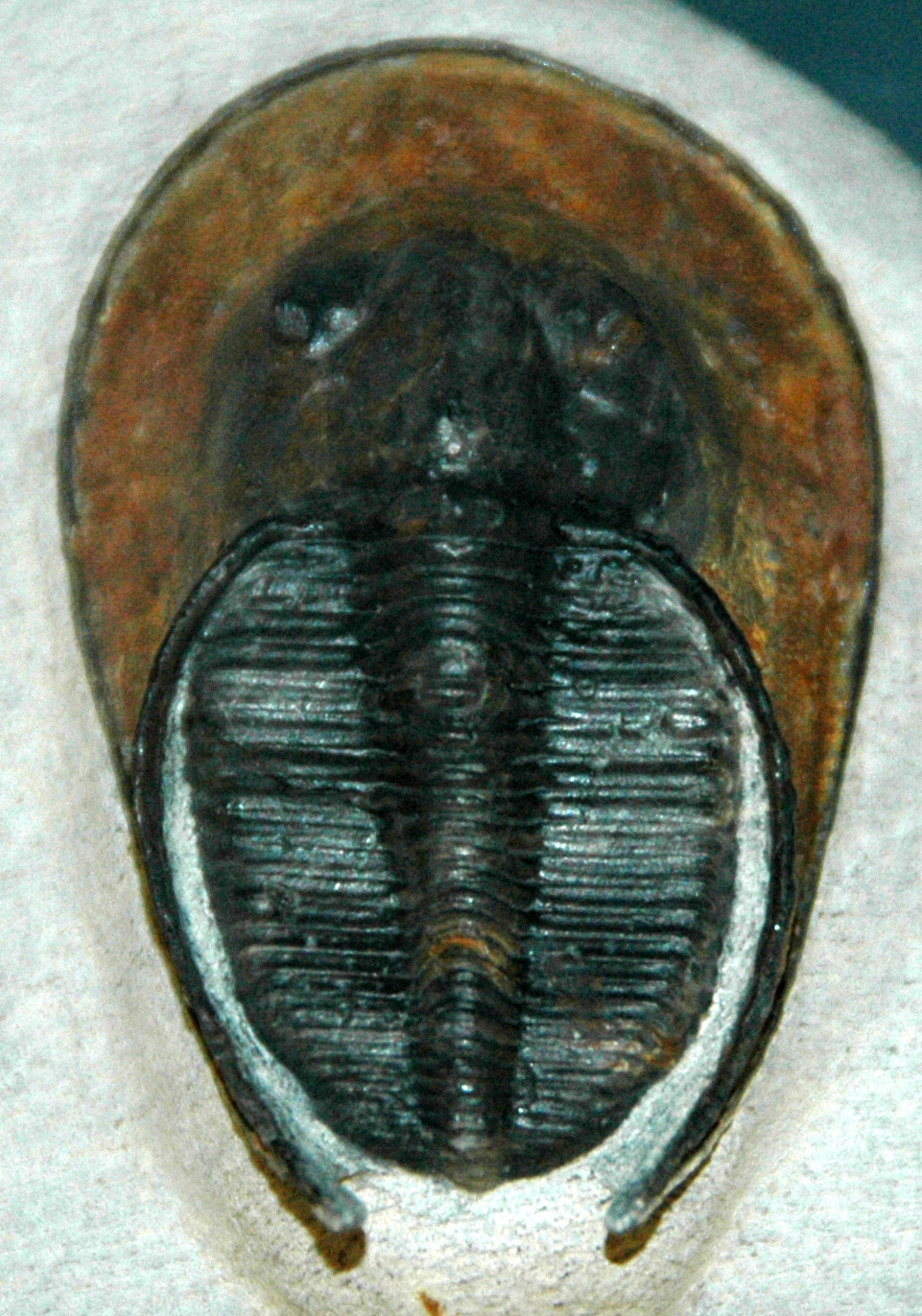
- A Harpetida trilobite from Morocco.

Scientific classification
- Kingdom: Animalia
- Phylum: Arthropoda
- Clade: †Artiopoda
- Class: †Trilobita
- Subclass: †Librostoma
- Order: †Harpetida; Whittington, 1959

Families
- Entomaspididae; Harpetidae; Harpididae

= Harpetida =

Harpetida Temporal range: Furongian–Frasnian

Extinct order of trilobites

Harpetida is one of the eleven orders of the extinct arthropod class Trilobita. The first harpetid trilobites appear in the Upper Cambrian, and the last species die out in the late Devonian period.

Harpetid trilobites are characterized among trilobites by bearing a comparatively large, semicircular brim around the cephalon (head) which is often perforated by small pores. This brim is thought to serve as a filter-feeding apparatus. The brim stretches backward on either side of the cephalon (head) and typically has a pronounced suture along the outside.

The compound eyes are typically reduced to small tubercles, though they have strong ridges stretching to the glabella (central region of the cephalon). They also typically have 12 or more thoracic segments. The pygidia are usually small.

The families of Harpetida were formerly included in the order Ptychopariida, but were recently given their own order in 2002. The subclass Librostoma was erected in 1990 by Richard Fortey to cover the various orders originally placed within Ptychopariida. The name "Harpidae" was once used as the name for the trilobite family containing the type genus Harpes. However, this is in conflict with the use of the same name for the family of harp snails and that taxon had precedence.

== Families and genera ==
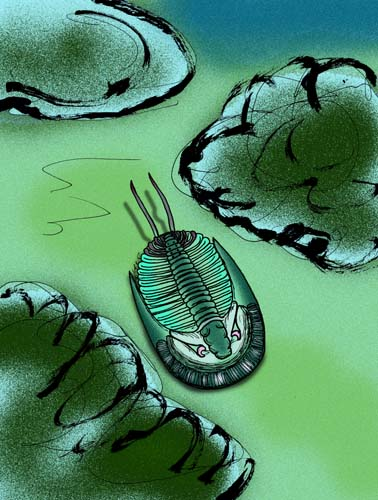
Life reconstruction of the Late Cambrian harpetid trilobite, Entomaspis radiata, from Utah

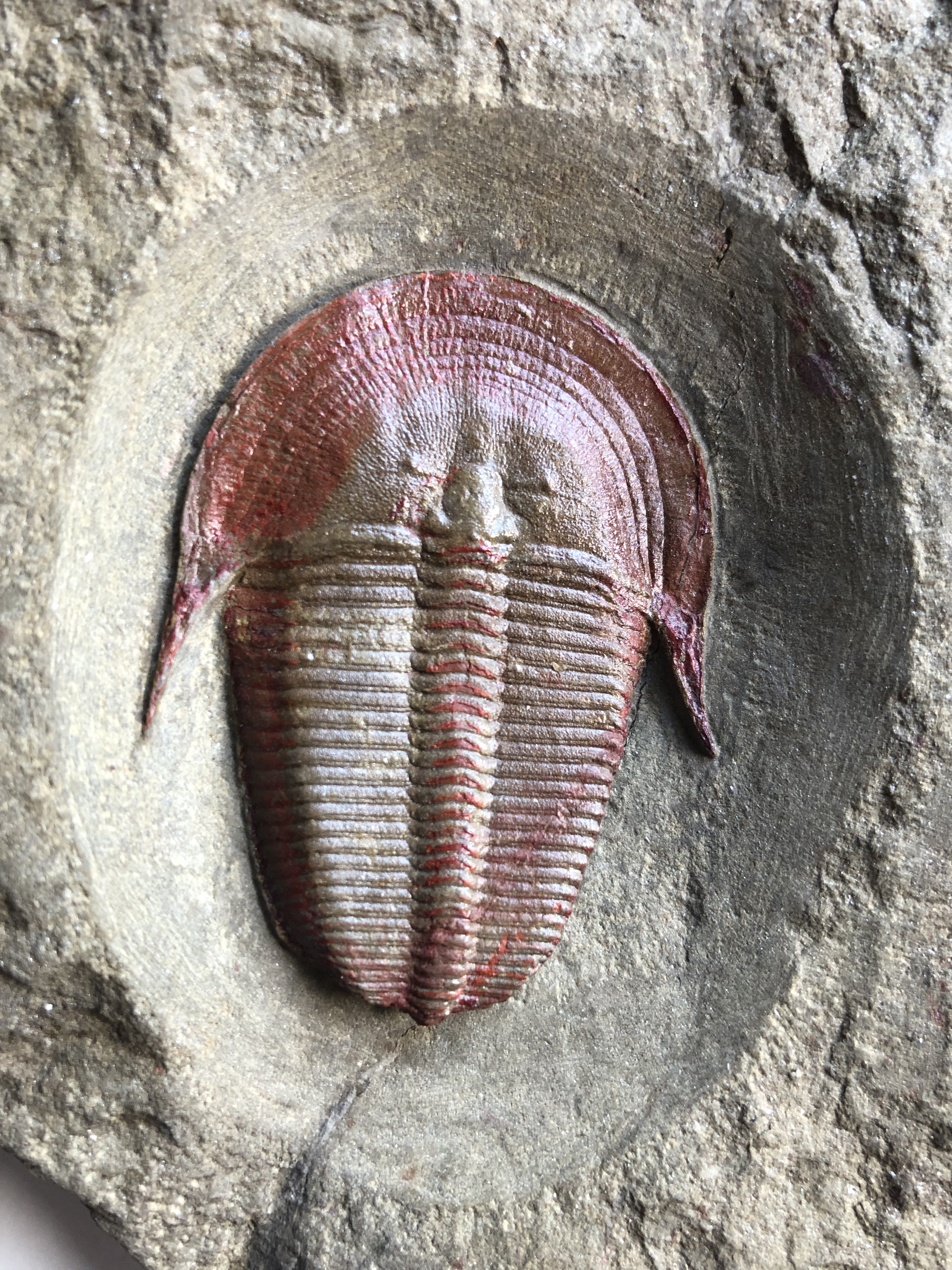
A fine Harpides sp., in the Ordovician shales of the Eastern Anti Atlas, Morocco

- Entomaspididae
  - Baikadamaspis
  - Entomaspis (=Hypothetica)
- Harpetidae
  - Arraphus
  - Bohemoharpes (=Declivoharpes; =Unguloharpes)
  - Bowmania
  - Brachyhipposiderus
  - Conococheaguea
  - Dolichoharpes
  - Dubhglasina (=Australoharpes; Sinoharpes)
  - Eoharpes (/Harpina)
  - Eotrinucleus
  - Eskoharpes (=Globoharpes?)
  - Globoharpes(?)
  - Harpes (=Helioharpes; Reticuloharpes)
  - Heterocaryon
  - Hibbertia (/Platyharpes; Harpesoides; Metaharpes; Paraharpes; Thorslundops; Wegelinia)
  - Kathrynia
  - Kielania (=Lowtheria)
  - Lioharpes (= Fritchapsis)
  - Maghroharpes
  - Paleoharpes
  - Pinnuloharpes
  - Scotoharpes (=Aristoharpes; Selenoharpes).
  - Stoloharpes
- Harpididae
  - Chencunia
  - Dictyocephalites
  - Fissocephalus
  - Harpides
  - Harpidoides
  - Kitatella
  - Loganopeltis
  - Loganopeltoides
  - Metaharpides
  - Paraharpides
  - Pscemiaspis
