= Maghroharpes =

Maghroharpes Temporal range: Early Devonian

Scientific classification
- Kingdom: Animalia
- Phylum: Arthropoda
- Clade: †Artiopoda
- Class: †Trilobita
- Order: †Harpetida
- Family: †Harpetidae
- Genus: †Maghroharpes; Johnson, 2024

Extinct genus of Trilobite

Maghroharpes is an extinct genus of trilobites in the family Harpetidae. It is known from the Devonian of Morocco.

== Species ==
The following species have been assigned to this genus:

- Maghroharpes azmamarensis
- Maghroharpes forteyi
- Maghroharpes hammii (type species)
- Maghroharpes ihmadii
- Maghroharpes laatchanensis
- Maghroharpes minutipunctus
- Maghroharpes oufatenensis
- Maghroharpes terridus
- Maghroharpes zguidensis
