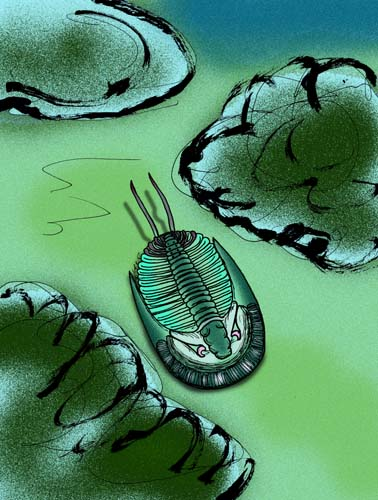
- E. radiata

Scientific classification
- Kingdom: Animalia
- Phylum: Arthropoda
- Clade: †Artiopoda
- Class: †Trilobita
- Order: †Harpetida
- Family: †Entomaspididae
- Genus: †Entomaspis; Ulrich, 1931

Type species
- Entomaspis radiata Ulrich, 1931

Species
- E. bridgei Rasetti 1952; E. clarki Raymond 1937; E. radiata Ulrich, 1931; E. rawi (Ross Jr. 1951)

= Entomaspis =

Entomaspis Temporal range: Furongian–Tremadocian

Extinct genus of trilobites

Entomaspis is an extinct genus of harpetid trilobite from Upper Cambrian to Early Ordovician marine strata of the United States. Species are typified by their proportionally large, vaulted, croissant-shaped or bonnet-shaped cephalons that have the cheeks freed to become elongated, curved librigenial spines, and by their comparatively large, crescent-shaped eyes (in comparison with other eyed harpetids).

== Species ==
=== E. bridgei ===
E. bridgei is a species found in marine strata of Missouri.

=== E. clarki ===
E. clarki is a species found in Lower Ordovician marine strata of Vermont.

=== E. radiata ===
E. radiata is the type species, and is found in Uppermost Cambrian and Lowermost Ordovician marine strata of Utah. It coexisted sympatrically with E. rawi.

=== E. rawi ===
E. rawi was originally described as Hypothetica rawi, and coexisted with E. radiata in Lowermost Ordovician marine strata of Utah.

== Sources ==
- Trilobite info (Sam Gon III)
