= Pholcophora =

Pholcophora Temporal range: Neogene– Present

Scientific classification
- Kingdom: Animalia
- Phylum: Arthropoda
- Subphylum: Chelicerata
- Class: Arachnida
- Order: Araneae
- Infraorder: Araneomorphae
- Family: Pholcidae
- Genus: Pholcophora; Banks, 1896

Type species
- P. americana Banks, 1896

Species
- 8, see text

Genus of spiders

Pholcophora is a genus of cellar spiders that was first described by Nathan Banks in 1896.

== Species ==
As of July 2023 it contains eight species, found in North America:

- Pholcophora americana Banks, 1896 (type) – USA, Canada
- Pholcophora bahama Gertsch, 1982 – Bahamas
- Pholcophora maria Gertsch, 1977 – Mexico
- Pholcophora mazatlan Huber, 2023 – Mexico
- Pholcophora mexcala Gertsch, 1982 – Mexico
- Pholcophora papanoa Huber, 2023 – Mexico
- Pholcophora tehuacan Huber, 2023 – Mexico
- Pholcophora texana Gertsch, 1935 – USA, Mexico

== See also ==
- List of Pholcidae species
