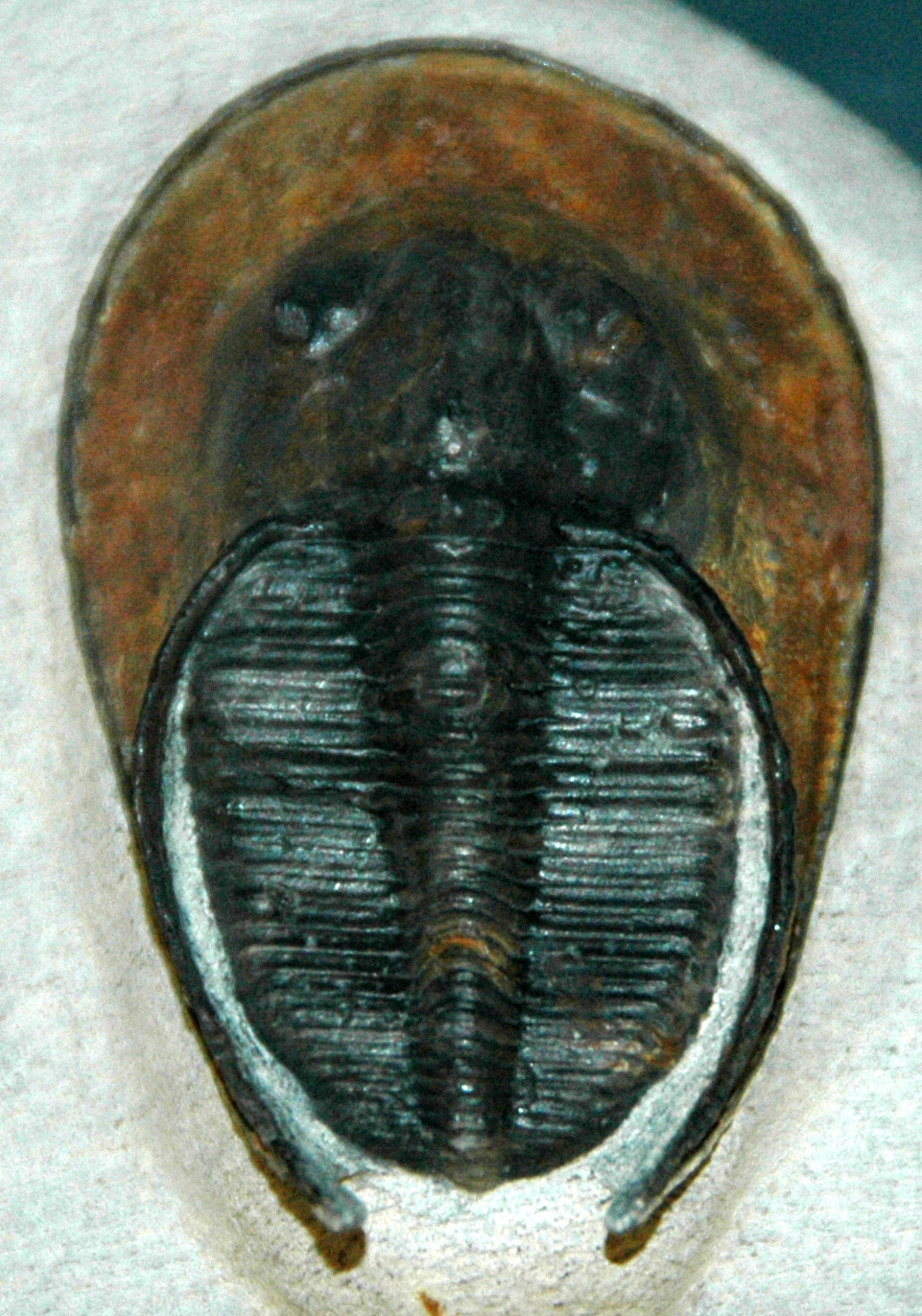
- Harpes perridiatus fossil from the Devonian of Morocco

Scientific classification
- Kingdom: Animalia
- Phylum: Arthropoda
- Clade: †Artiopoda
- Class: †Trilobita
- Order: †Harpetida
- Family: †Harpetidae; Hawle and Corda, 1847

Genera
- See text

= Harpetidae =

Harpetidae Temporal range: Furongian–Frasnian

Extinct family of trilobites

Harpetidae is a family of trilobites in the order Harpetida. They first appear in the Furongian (Late Cambrian) epoch. The Taghanic event at the end of the Middle Devonian would impact them severely, with no genera from before surviving to the Frasnian, where two new genera, Eskoharpes and Globoharpes appear, before going extinct themselves in the Kellwasser event. Globoharpes may be a synonym of Eskoharpes.

== Genera ==
- Harpetidae
  - Arraphus
  - Bohemoharpes (=Declivoharpes; =Unguloharpes)
  - Bowmania
  - Brachyhipposiderus
  - Conococheaguea
  - Dolichoharpes
  - Dubhglasina (=Australoharpes; Sinoharpes)
  - Eoharpes (/Harpina)
  - Eotrinucleus
  - Eskoharpes (=Globoharpes?)
  - Globoharpes(?)
  - Harpes (=Helioharpes; Reticuloharpes)
  - Heterocaryon
  - Hibbertia (/Platyharpes; Harpesoides; Metaharpes; Paraharpes; Thorslundops; Wegelinia)
  - Kathrynia
  - Kielania (=Lowtheria)
  - Lioharpes (= Fritchapsis)
  - Maghroharpes
  - Paleoharpes
  - Pinnuloharpes
  - Scotoharpes (=Aristoharpes; Selenoharpes).
  - Stoloharpes
