= Globoharpes =

Globoharpes Temporal range: Frasnian

Scientific classification
- Kingdom: Animalia
- Phylum: Arthropoda
- Clade: †Artiopoda
- Class: †Trilobita
- Order: †Harpetida
- Family: †Harpetidae
- Genus: †Globoharpes; McNamara, Feist & Ebach, 2009

Genus of harpetid trilobite

Globoharpes is a genus of harpetid trilobite known from the late Frasnian of Western Australia.

== Species ==
- Globoharpes tiecherti
- Globoharpes freindi
