= Antricola inexpectata =

Scientific classification
- Domain: Eukaryota
- Kingdom: Animalia
- Phylum: Arthropoda
- Subphylum: Chelicerata
- Class: Arachnida
- Order: Ixodida
- Family: Argasidae
- Genus: Antricola
- Species: A. inexpectata

Binomial name
- Antricola inexpectata (Estrada-Pena, Barros-Battesti & Venzal, 2004)

Species of tick

Antricola inexpectata is a species of soft shell ticks in the family Argasidae. Like Nothoaspis, another genus in the same family, Antricola species infest cave-dwelling bats. A. inexpectata parasites insectivorous cave-dwelling bats of the Pteronotus genus, and are only parasitic in larva form, and are non-parasitic as adults. A. inexpectata is closely related to Antricola delacruzi and Antricola guglielmonei. In both adult and larva form the primary food source appears to be bat guano, although the exact component of the guano that is consumed remains unclear. They are all indigenous to the Brazilian rain forest.
