= Antricola marginatus =

Scientific classification
- Kingdom: Animalia
- Phylum: Arthropoda
- Subphylum: Chelicerata
- Class: Arachnida
- Order: Ixodida
- Family: Argasidae
- Genus: Antricola
- Species: A. marginatus

Binomial name
- Antricola marginatus (Banks, 1910)

Species of tick

Antricola marginatus is a species of tick in the family Argasidae. Like Nothoaspis, another genus in the same family, Antricola species infest cave-dwelling bats; A. marginatus is found on Cuba and Puerto Rico. Unusually for a tick, A. marginatus shows maternal care of its offspring.

These ticks are considered soft ticks, because of their subterminal capitulum (head) found in nymphs (juvenile ticks with a full complement of legs) and adult ticks. The capitulum of these ticks can not be seen in dorsal view because it lies within a groove or depression called a camerostome. The dorsal wall of the camerostome extends over the capitulum and is called the hood.
