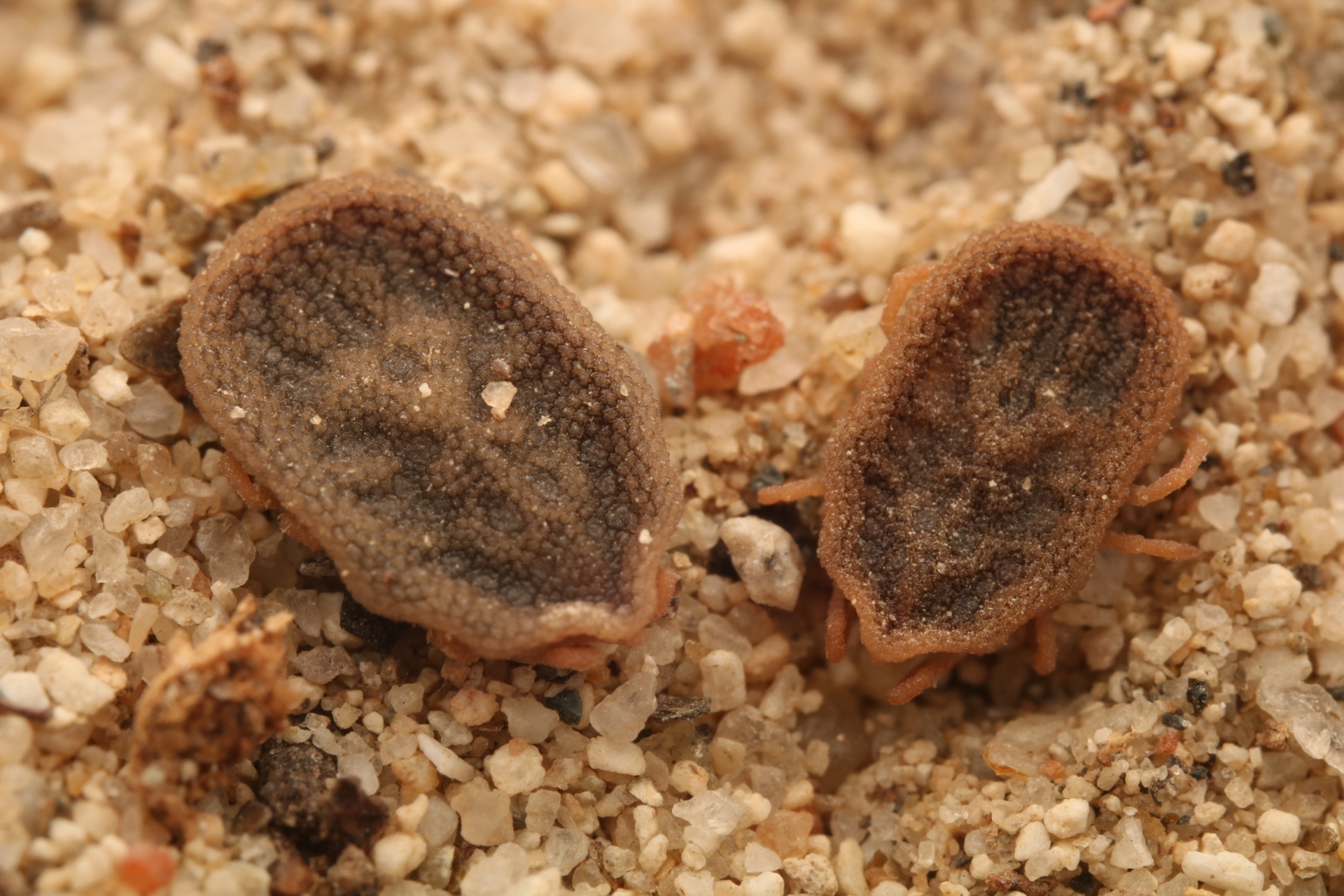

Scientific classification
- Kingdom: Animalia
- Phylum: Arthropoda
- Subphylum: Chelicerata
- Class: Arachnida
- Order: Ixodida
- Family: Argasidae
- Genus: Alectorobius
- Species: A. kelleyi

Binomial name
- Alectorobius kelleyi Cooley & Kohls, 1941

= Alectorobius kelleyi =

Species of tick

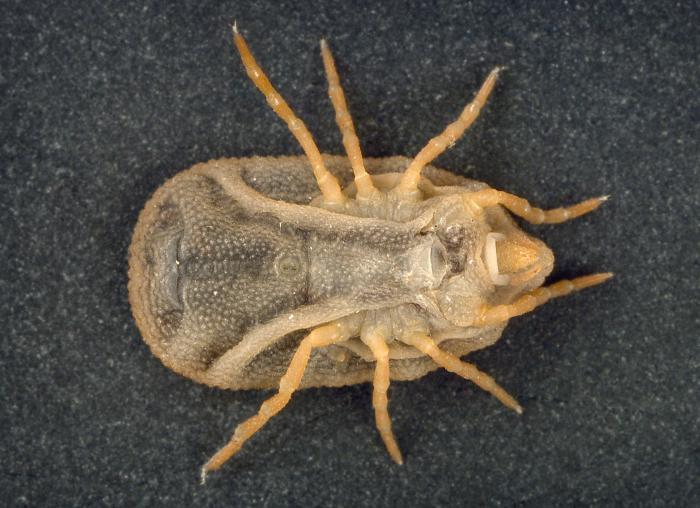
Ventral view of Alectorobius kelleyi.

Alectorobius kelleyi is an argasid tick parasite of bats.

The species is found widely throughout North America, including the United States, Costa Rica, Mexico and Cuba. It primarily feeds on Eptesicus fuscus, but is also known to rarely bite humans and domestic dogs.

A. kelleyi are often vectors for Rickettsia bacteria species from the spotted fever group, and relapsing fever Borrelia spirochetes. The pathogenicity of these bacteria to humans and bats is unknown, but there is correlative evidence that bites from the species may cause tick-borne disease.

The species is named for Thomas F. Kelley Jr. who discovered the tick while studying at UC Berkeley in 1941.
