= Antricola guglielmonei =

Scientific classification
- Kingdom: Animalia
- Phylum: Arthropoda
- Subphylum: Chelicerata
- Class: Arachnida
- Order: Ixodida
- Family: Argasidae
- Genus: Antricola
- Species: A. guglielmonei

Binomial name
- Antricola guglielmonei (Estrada-Pena, Barros-Battesti & Venzal, 2004)

Species of tick

Antricola guglielmonei is a species of soft tick in the family Argasidae, indigenous to the Brazilian rainforest. The species has sympatry with Antricola delacruzi, infesting cave-dwelling bats. Like A. delacruzi, it was described from specimens found in guano, but it is not known whether, like the former, the species feeds on guano as nymphs and adults. A subsequent longitudinal study did not encounter the species in guano, but postulated that Brazilian Antricola, including A. delacruzi, A. guglielmonei and A. inexpectata may share similar behaviour.
