= Nothoaspis reddelli =

Scientific classification
- Kingdom: Animalia
- Phylum: Arthropoda
- Subphylum: Chelicerata
- Class: Arachnida
- Order: Ixodida
- Family: Argasidae
- Genus: Nothoaspis
- Species: N. reddelli

Binomial name
- Nothoaspis reddelli Keirans & Clifford, 1975

Synonyms
- Carios reddelli

Species of tick

Nothoaspis reddelli, also known as Carios reddelli, is a tick that feeds on the ghost-faced bat.

== Discovery ==
The tick was discovered in 1975 by James E. Kierans and Carleton M. Clifford in a cave located in Campeche, Mexico. The tick is very similar to those of the genus Antricola, but Nothoaspis reddelli is the only tick species with a false shield on the anterior (front) half of its body, showing it to be both a new genus and a new species.

== Life cycle ==
The most common host of Nothoaspis reddelli is the insectivorous bat Mormoops megalophylla. A member of the Argasidae family, N. reddelli, has a multi-host life cycle (feeding on two or more hosts), feeding off each host to reach adulthood. After hatching, the instar finds its first host to feed upon and grows into a larva. The larva molts and develops into a nymph, which finds the second host. After feeding off and leaving its second host, N. reddelli molts once more. The nymph then feeds on a third host. This cycle is repeated for up to seven days, after which the nymph leaves its final host and molts to reach a sexually mature form. Mating and hatching of eggs occurs away from hosts. Mated females oviposit frequently, leaving multiple eggs (though fewer than 500 eggs per cycle).

== Morphology ==
Females and males differ greatly in their hypostomal dentition. Males have two pairs of setae on the pedipalps, and females have one pair. The female hood is large, spherical, and can be seen from above. Females also have an oval-shaped plate with spiracles (holes that are used to breathe), located on the underside of the abdomen near the lungs. They have a hard, smooth outer coating on the front half of their dorsal surface composed of three large pieces positioned in a triangle: one in the front and two in the back. Each of these parts has two smaller parts on each side. The back of the dorsal surface is arranged in structures similar to cells.

Adult and nymphal N. reddelli have a "false shield" over the anterior half of the body.

== Feeding ==
N. reddelli, like all other ticks, must consume the host's blood as food. It cannot jump or fly, so it latches onto the ghost-faced bat and makes a hole in the bat's epidermis to drink blood. N. reddelli releases a numbing agent to keep the bat from becoming aware of the ticks presence, and releases an anticoagulant to keep the blood from clotting. When the tick is finished feeding, it unlatches from the bat and disembarks, where it will prepare for its next feeding.

== Range and habitat ==
At first, it was believed that N. reddelli was endemic to Mexico. It was originally discovered in the guano of the ghost-faced bat in the Grutas de Xtacumbilxunam caves in Campeche, and was later observed in Yucatán and Tabasco. However, in 2015, N. reddelli was also found Nicaragua.

The ghost-faced bat, and thus Nothoaspis reddelli, live in hot and humid caves. The environment within the cave is more important to the tick than the distribution of the ghost-faced bat, which is not much of a limiting factor. The cave in which the tick was first discovered is grimy, small, moist, and dark; it also contained a cenote. The Mayans once lived in the cave, but it is no longer inhabited by humans. N. reddelli thrives in temperatures ranging from 32–36 °C (90–97 °F).

== Diseases ==
It is currently unknown whether Nothoaspis reddelli feeds off humans or carries diseases that humans are susceptible to.
