= Otobius lagophilus =

Scientific classification
- Kingdom: Animalia
- Phylum: Arthropoda
- Subphylum: Chelicerata
- Class: Arachnida
- Order: Ixodida
- Family: Argasidae
- Genus: Otobius
- Species: O. lagophilus

Binomial name
- Otobius lagophilus Cooley and Kohls, 1940

Species of tick

Otobius lagophilus is a soft-bodied tick that is only parasitic in the larval and nymphal stages. The tick's parasitic forms are usually found within the ears of the definitive host particularly rabbits and in rare cases cats.

== Habitat ==
Otobius lagophilus ticks are generally associated with semiarid or arid environments such as those of the Southwestern United States. They have been observed in California, Colorado, Idaho, Montana, Nevada, Oregon, and Wyoming, but have in isolated cases been seen as far north as Alberta, Canada.

== Life cycle ==
Otobius lagophilus has a lifecycle similar to Otobius megnini, only being parasitic in the nymphal stage. The most common hosts are rabbits, with the ticks attaching themselves particularly around the face and ears, although in rare cases, cats have also served this role. The adult form of O. lagophilus are nonparasitic, yet are still often found around and in rabbit burrows.
