= Alectorobius sawaii =

Scientific classification
- Kingdom: Animalia
- Phylum: Arthropoda
- Subphylum: Chelicerata
- Class: Arachnida
- Order: Ixodida
- Family: Argasidae
- Genus: Alectorobius
- Species: A. sawaii

Binomial name
- Alectorobius sawaii Kitaoka & Suzuki, 1973

Species of tick

Alectorobius sawaii is a species of argasid tick that parasitises streaked shearwater and Swinhoe's storm petrel seabirds in Japan and Korea. The species name honors Hirofumi Sawa of Hokkaido University in Sapporo, Japan.
