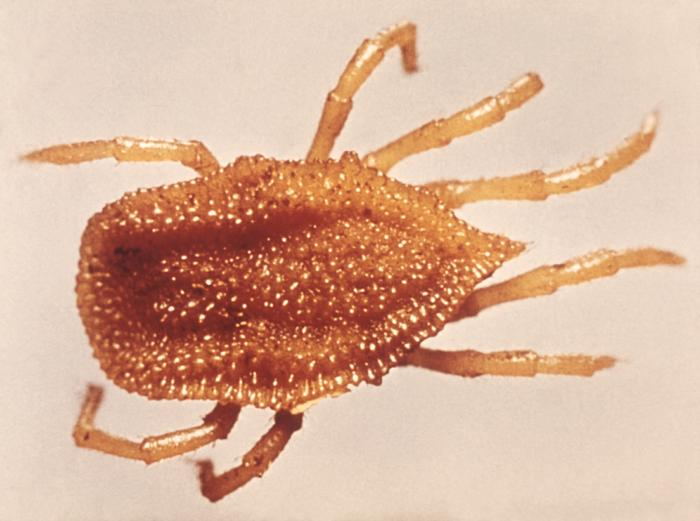
- an Antricola species from a bat.

Scientific classification
- Kingdom: Animalia
- Phylum: Arthropoda
- Subphylum: Chelicerata
- Class: Arachnida
- Order: Ixodida
- Family: Argasidae
- Subfamily: Ornithodorinae
- Genus: Antricola; Cooley & Kohls, 1942

Type species
- Antricola coprophilus (McIntosh, 1935)

= Antricola =

Genus of ticks

Antricola is a genus of soft ticks in the family Argasidae.

It is very similar to the subgenus Nothoaspis, which contains the species Nothoaspis reddelli.

== Species ==
Antricola is one of nine genera in the Argasid subfamily Ornithodorinae. The genus currently contains 17 species in two subgenera:

=== Antricola ===
- A. (Antricola) armasi de la Cruz and Estrada-Peña, 1995
- A. (Antricola) centralis de la Cruz and Estrada-Peña, 1995
- A. (Antricola) cernyi de la Cruz, 1978
- A. (Antricola) coprophilus (McIntosh, 1935)
- A. (Antricola) delacruzi Estrada-Peña, Barros-Battesti and Venzal, 2004
- A. (Antricola) granasi de la Cruz, 1973
- A. (Antricola) guglielmonei Estrada-Peña, Barros-Battesti and Venzal, 2004
- A. (Antricola) habanensis de la Cruz, 1976
- A. (Antricola) hummelincki de la Cruz and Estrada-Peña, 1995
- A. (Antricola) inexpectata Estrada-Peña, Barros-Battesti and Venzal, 2004
- A. (Antricola) martelorum de la Cruz, 1978
- A. (Antricola) mexicanus Hoffmann, 1958
- A. (Antricola) naomiae de la Cruz, 1978
- A. (Antricola) occidentalis de la Cruz, 1978
- A. (Antricola) siboneyi de la Cruz and Estrada-Peña, 1995
- A. (Antricola) silvai Černý, 1967

=== Parantricola ===
- A. (Parantricola) marginatus (Banks, 1910)
