= Reticulinasus madagascariensis =

Scientific classification
- Kingdom: Animalia
- Phylum: Arthropoda
- Subphylum: Chelicerata
- Class: Arachnida
- Order: Ixodida
- Family: Argasidae
- Genus: Reticulinasus
- Species: R. madagascariensis

Binomial name
- Reticulinasus madagascariensis Hoogstraal, 1962

Species of tick

Reticulinasus madagascariensis is a "soft tick" (family Argasidae) that parasitizes cave-inhabiting fruit bats in the genus Megachiroptera. First circumscribed in 1962 by Harry Hoogstraal, it is classified in the subgenus Reticulinasus.

When engorged with the blood of their host, the larvae of R. madagascariensis measure slightly over 1.0 mm from the apex of the anterior hypostome to the posterior body margin. In the larval stage, R. madagascariensis and other members of the subgenus Reticulinasus are characterized by a reticulated Haller's organ, and in the adult stage by small size; piriform shape; absence of eyes, cheeks, a distinct hood and dorsal tarsal humps; and mammillated integument. All stages have pulvilli that are unusually large for Ornithodoros ticks. R. madagascariensis larvae have a heartshaped squamous area on the medial dorsal surface. Their short hypostome resembles that of O. rennellensis, but the two species differ in other criteria.

== Distribution ==
Reticulinasus madagascariensis appears to be limited to the island of Madagascar. Other members of the subgenus have been collected in Malaya, Mindanao, Borneo, the Solomon Islands, Timor, India, Egypt, Lebanon, Palestine, and the Congo River region of Africa.
