= Robert Cooley =

Robert Cooley may refer to:

- Robert Cooley (lawyer) (born 1943), US author, former Mafia lawyer and government informant
- Robert Cooley (entomologist) (1873–1968), US entomologist
- Robert E. Cooley, president emeritus of Gordon-Conwell Theological Seminary
