= Apanaskevichiella =

Scientific classification
- Kingdom: Animalia
- Phylum: Arthropoda
- Subphylum: Chelicerata
- Class: Arachnida
- Order: Ixodida
- Family: Argasidae
- Genus: Apanaskevichiella; Barker et al., 2025
- Species: A. macmillani

Binomial name
- Apanaskevichiella macmillani (Hoogstraal & Kohls, 1966)

Genus of tick

Apanaskevichiella, is a genus of argasid soft tick belonging to the family Argasidae. The genus is monotypic containing a single species Apanaskevichiella macmillani, the McMillans Australian tree-hollow argasid. It is a parasite found on Cockatoos in Australia.

== Taxonomy ==
The species was described as Ornithodoros macmillani by Hoogstraal & Kohls in 1966. It was later revised as Apanaskevichiella macmillani (Hoogstraal & Kohls, 1966)
