= Reticulinasus =

Scientific classification
- Kingdom: Animalia
- Phylum: Arthropoda
- Subphylum: Chelicerata
- Class: Arachnida
- Order: Ixodida
- Family: Argasidae
- Subfamily: Ornithodorinae
- Genus: Reticulinasus; Schulze, 1941

Type species
- Reticulinasus batuensis (Hirst, 1929)

Genus of ticks

Reticulinasus is a genus of soft ticks in the family Argasidae.

== Species ==
Reticulinasus is one of nine genera in the Argasid subfamily Ornithodorinae. The genus currently contains 12 species:

- R. (Reticulinasus) batuensis Hirst, 1929
- R. (Reticulinasus) camicasi Sylla, Cornet and Marchand, 1997
- R. (Reticulinasus) chiropterphila Dhanda and Rajagopalan, 1971
- R. (Reticulinasus) faini Hoogstraal, 1960
- R. (Reticulinasus) hadiae Klompen, Keirans and Durden, 1995
- R. (Reticulinasus) madagascariensis Hoogstraal, 1962
- R. (Reticulinasus) multisetosus Klompen, Keirans and Durden, 1995
- R. (Reticulinasus) papuensis Klompen, Keirans and Durden, 1995
- R. (Reticulinasus) piriformis Warburton, 1918
- R. (Reticulinasus) rennellensis Clifford and Sonenshine, 1962
- R. (Reticulinasus) salahi Hoogstraal, 1953
- R. (Reticulinasus) solomonis Dumbleton, 1959
