= Proknekalia =

Scientific classification
- Kingdom: Animalia
- Phylum: Arthropoda
- Subphylum: Chelicerata
- Class: Arachnida
- Order: Ixodida
- Family: Argasidae
- Subfamily: Argasinae
- Genus: Proknekalia; Keirans et al., 1977

Type species
- Proknekalia peringueyi (Bedford and Hewitt, 1925)

Genus of ticks

Proknekalia is a genus of soft ticks in the family Argasidae.

Proknekalia is one of six genera in the Argasid subfamily Argasinae. The genus currently contains three species:

- P. peringueyi (Bedford & Hewitt, 1925)
- P. peusi (Schulze, 1943)
- P. vansomereni (Keirans, Hoogstraal & Clifford, 1977)
