= Alveonasus =

Scientific classification
- Kingdom: Animalia
- Phylum: Arthropoda
- Subphylum: Chelicerata
- Class: Arachnida
- Order: Ixodida
- Family: Argasidae
- Subfamily: Argasinae
- Genus: Alveonasus; Neumann, 1908

Type species
- Alveonasus lahorensis Neumann, 1908

Genus of ticks

Alveonasus is a genus of soft ticks belonging to the family Argasidae.

== Species ==
Alveonasus is one of six genera in the Argasid subfamily Argasinae. The genus currently contains 7 species.

- A. (Alveonasus) acinus Whittick, 1938
- A. (Alveonasus) buettikeri Vial & Camicas, 2009
- A. (Alveonasus) canestrinii Birula, 1895
- A. (Alveonasus) delanoei Roubaud & Colas-Belcour, 1931
- A. (Alveonasus) eboris Theiler, 1959
- A. (Alveonasus) foleyi Parrot, 1928
- A. (Alveonasus) lahorensis Neumann, 1908
