= Secretargas =

Scientific classification
- Kingdom: Animalia
- Phylum: Arthropoda
- Subphylum: Chelicerata
- Class: Arachnida
- Order: Ixodida
- Family: Argasidae
- Subfamily: Argasinae
- Genus: Secretargas; Hoogstraal, 1957

Type species
- Secretargas transgariepinus (White, 1846)

Genus of ticks

Secretargas is a genus of soft ticks in the family Argasidae.

Secretargas is one of six genera in the Argasid subfamily Argasinae. The genus currently contains three species:

- S. echinops (Hoogstraal, Uilenberg & Blanc, 1967)
- S. hoogstraali (Morel & Vassiliades, 1965)
- S. transgariepinus (White, 1846)
