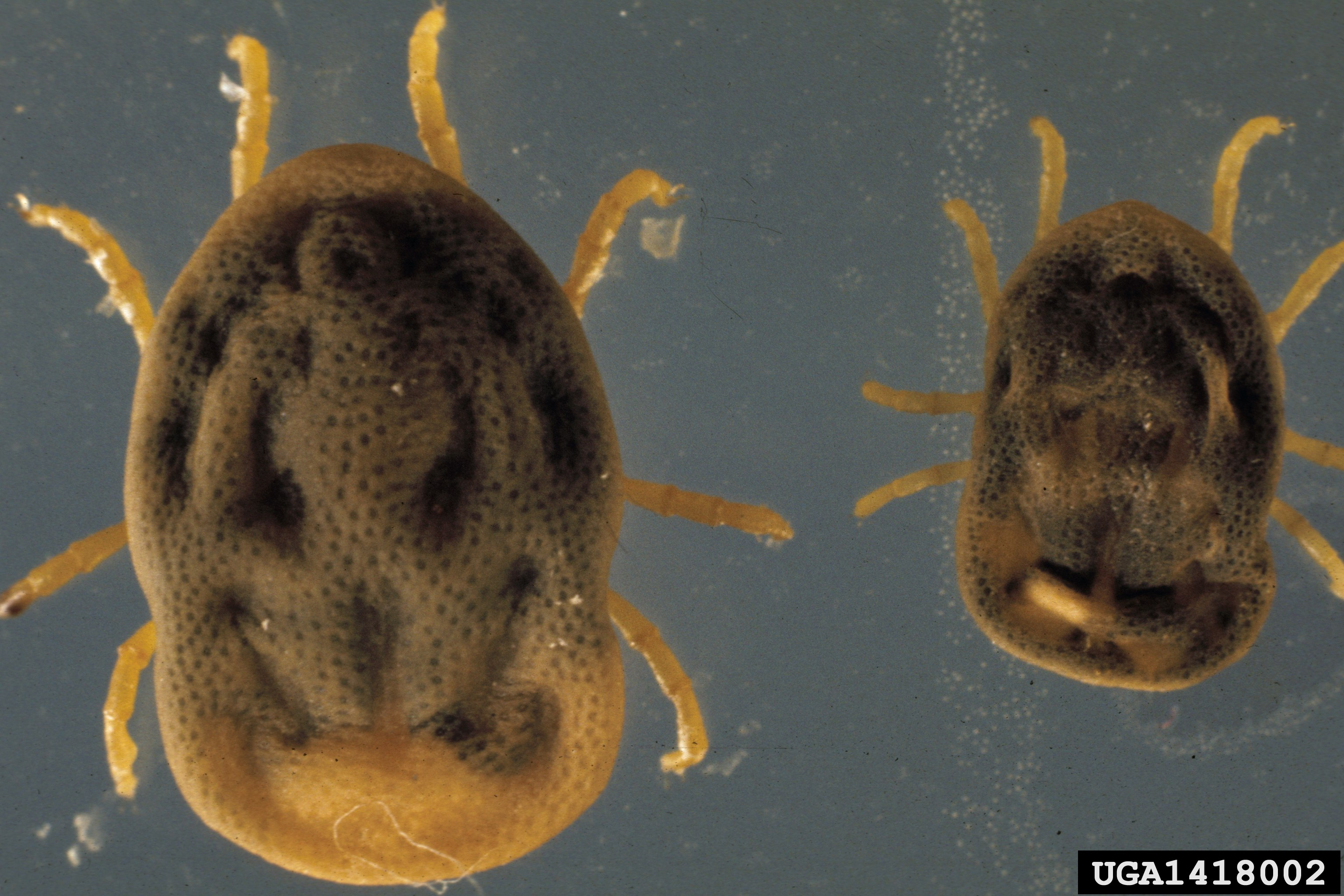
- Otobius megnini

Scientific classification
- Kingdom: Animalia
- Phylum: Arthropoda
- Subphylum: Chelicerata
- Class: Arachnida
- Order: Ixodida
- Family: Argasidae
- Subfamily: Ornithodorinae
- Genus: Otobius; Banks, 1912

Type species
- Otobius (Otobius) megnini (Dugès, 1883)

Synonyms
- Otophilus Torreggiani, 1912

= Otobius =

Genus of ticks

Otobius is a genus in the soft-bodied tick family, Argasidae. While similar to the genus Ornithodoros, it is characterized by a vestigial hypostome in adults, despite being developed in nymphs, in addition to the absence of both eyes and hood.

== Species ==
Otobius is one of several genera in the Argasid subfamily Ornithodorinae. However, its subfamilial placement has been questioned in Mans et al. 2024. The genus currently contains two species:

- O. (Otobius) lagophilus Cooley & Kohls, 1940
- O. (Otobius) megnini (Dugès, 1883)
