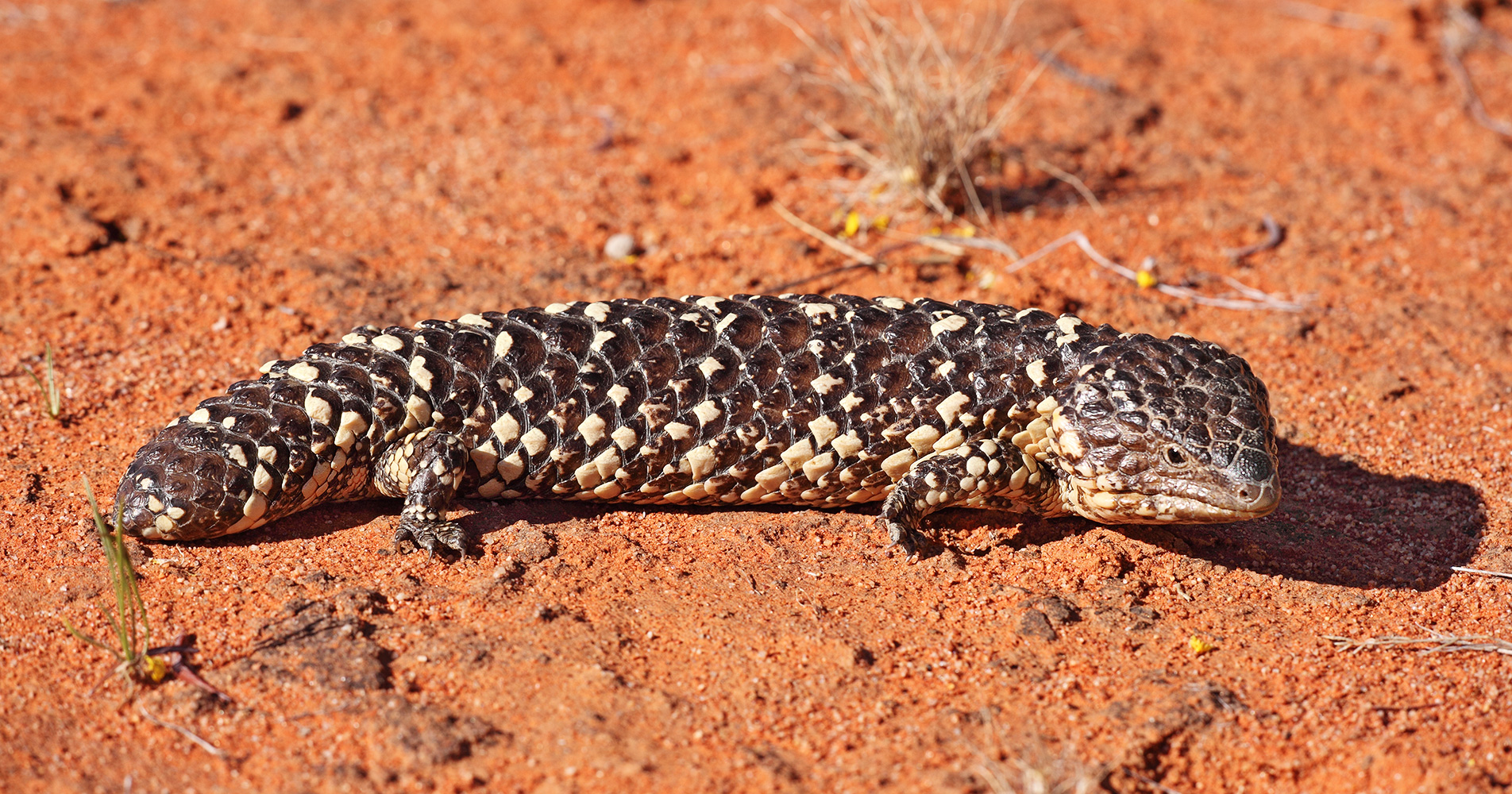
- Eastern shingleback

Conservation status
- Least Concern (IUCN 3.1)

Scientific classification
- Kingdom: Animalia
- Phylum: Chordata
- Class: Reptilia
- Order: Squamata
- Family: Scincidae
- Genus: Tiliqua
- Species: T. rugosa

Binomial name
- Tiliqua rugosa (Gray, 1825)

Subspecies
- T. r. rugosa T. r. asper T. r. konowi T. r. palarra
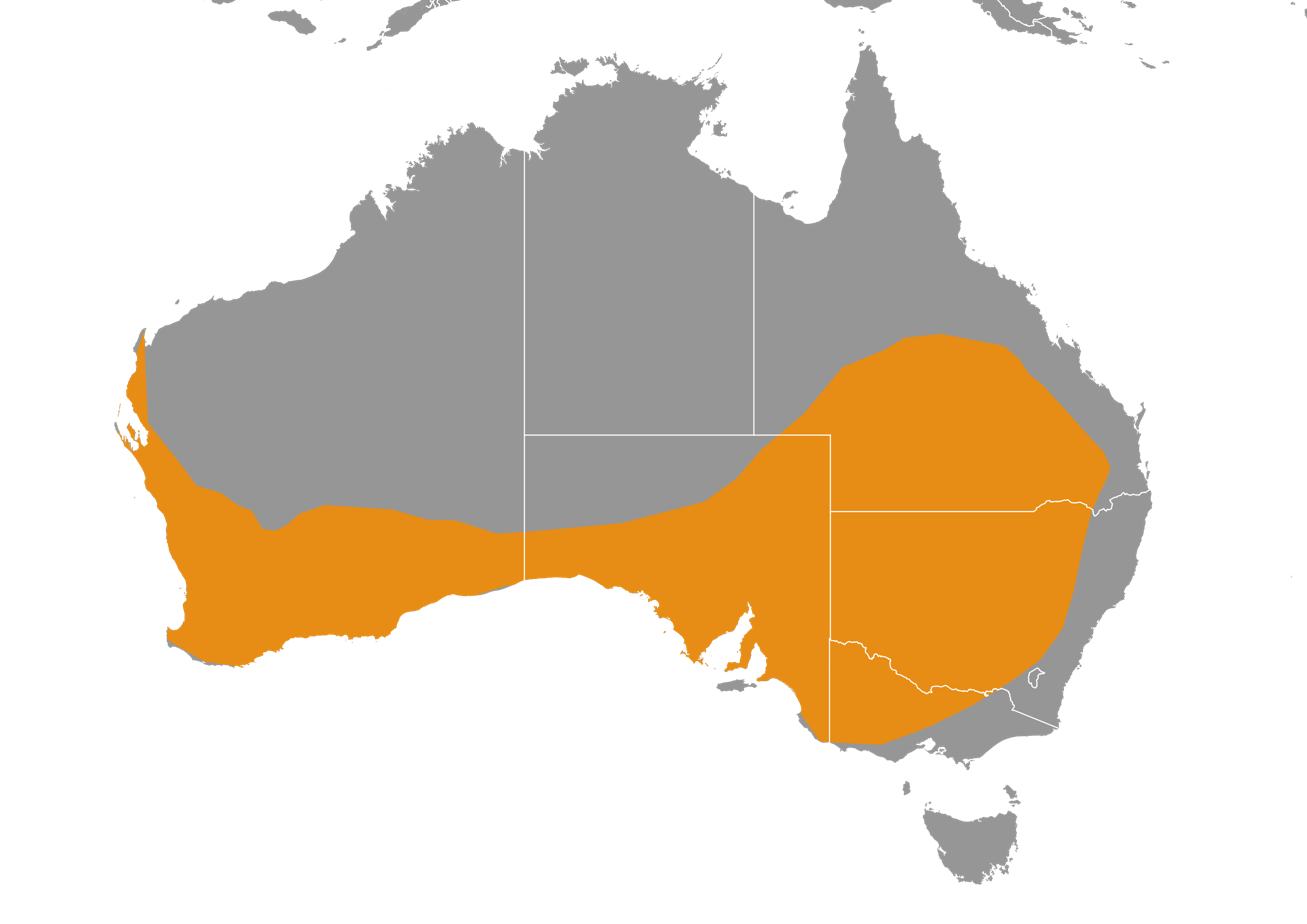
- Distribution of Tiliqua rugosa

Synonyms
- Trachydosaurus rugosus

= Tiliqua rugosa =

Species of lizard

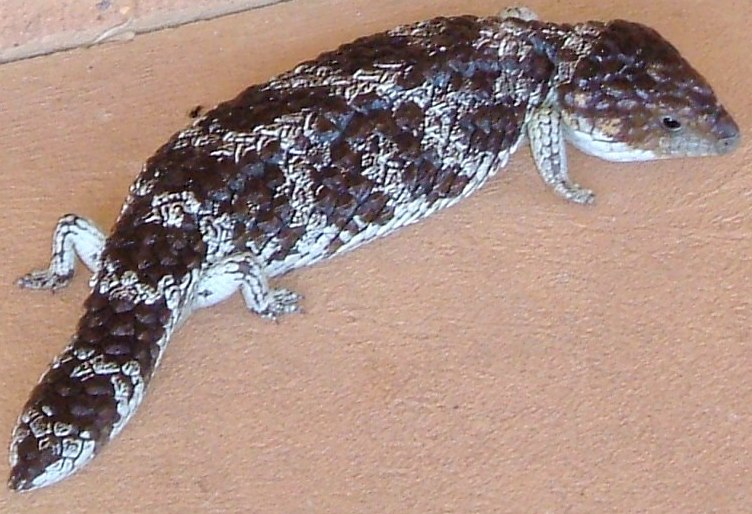
Western shingleback

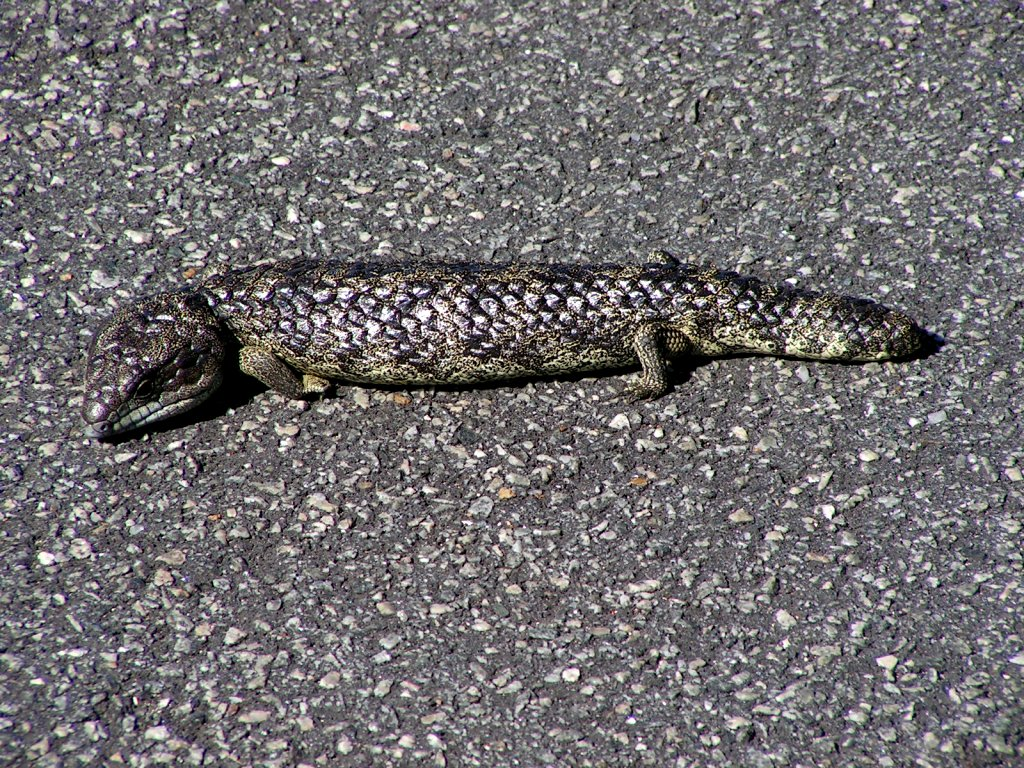
Rottnest Island shingleback

Tiliqua rugosa, most commonly known as the shingleback skink, shingleback lizard, bobtail lizard, and the two-headed skink (often simply shingleback or bobtail); is a short-tailed, slow-moving species of blue-tongued skink (genus Tiliqua) endemic to Australia. Three of its four recognised subspecies are found in Western Australia, where the bobtail name is most frequently used. The fourth subspecies, T. rugosa asper, is the only one native to eastern Australia, where it goes by the common name of the eastern shingleback.

Apart from bobtail and shingleback, a variety of other common names are used in different states, including two-headed skink, stumpy lizard, stumpy-tailed lizard, pinecone lizard, bogeye or boggi, and less commonly: sleepy lizard. The Noongar Aboriginal people refer to T. rugosa as yoorn in their language.

T. rugosa has a short, wide, stumpy tail that resembles its head and may serve the purpose of confusing predators. The tail also contains fat reserves, which are drawn upon during brumation in winter, during which many lizards perform a behaviour similar to hibernation except they require water every day, but can go without food. This skink is an omnivore; it eats snails and plants and spends much of its time browsing through vegetation for food. In human habitation, it is often seen basking on roadsides or other paved areas.

== Etymology and taxonomy ==
The species was first described by John Edward Gray in 1825 as Trachydosaurus rugosus. It is now classified as Tiliqua rugosa. Some herpetologists claim this species has more common names than any other lizard.

== Subspecies ==
Four subspecies of Tiliqua rugosa are currently recognised:

- Tiliqua rugosa asper: eastern shingleback – eastern Australia (New South Wales, Queensland, South Australia and Victoria)
- T. rugosa rugosa: bobtail or western shingleback – Western Australia
- T. rugosa konowi: Rottnest Island bobtail or Rottnest Island shingleback – Rottnest Island, Western Australia
- T. rugosa palarra: northern bobtail or Shark Bay shingleback – Shark Bay, Western Australia

== Distribution and habitat ==
The species is widely distributed in arid to semiarid regions of southern and western Australia. The range extends from Broome, Western Australia, across the southernmost regions of the country to the coast, then north into Queensland. Four subspecies are found in Western Australia, including one at Rottnest Island. It also lives in the eastern states of Victoria and New South Wales, but does not reach coastal areas in these states.

The habitat of the species includes shrub lands, eucalyptus forests, desert grasslands, and sandy dunes. They often shelter in the bush under low foliage. Being cold-blooded, these skinks are well known to have a strong preference for sun basking in open areas, and are often seen along roadsides, paddock edges or other cleared areas in its range. On average, individuals have a home range of four hectares, and can move up to 500 metres per day.

These lizards show strong home range site stability for up to several years and often multiple lizards can utilise the same burrow. As conditions become hotter and drier these lizards tend to share the burrows. During the spring time and given an adequate source of food that season and normal mating behaviour, males can often overlap each other's ranges. This can lead to territoriality and agonistic behaviour.

== Description ==
Tiliqua rugosa has a heavily armoured body and can be found in various colours, ranging from dark brown to cream. Its snout–vent length varies from 260 to 310 mm (10 to 12 in), and it is very heavy-bodied for its length. Their eyes are small with a reddish-brown and grey colour.

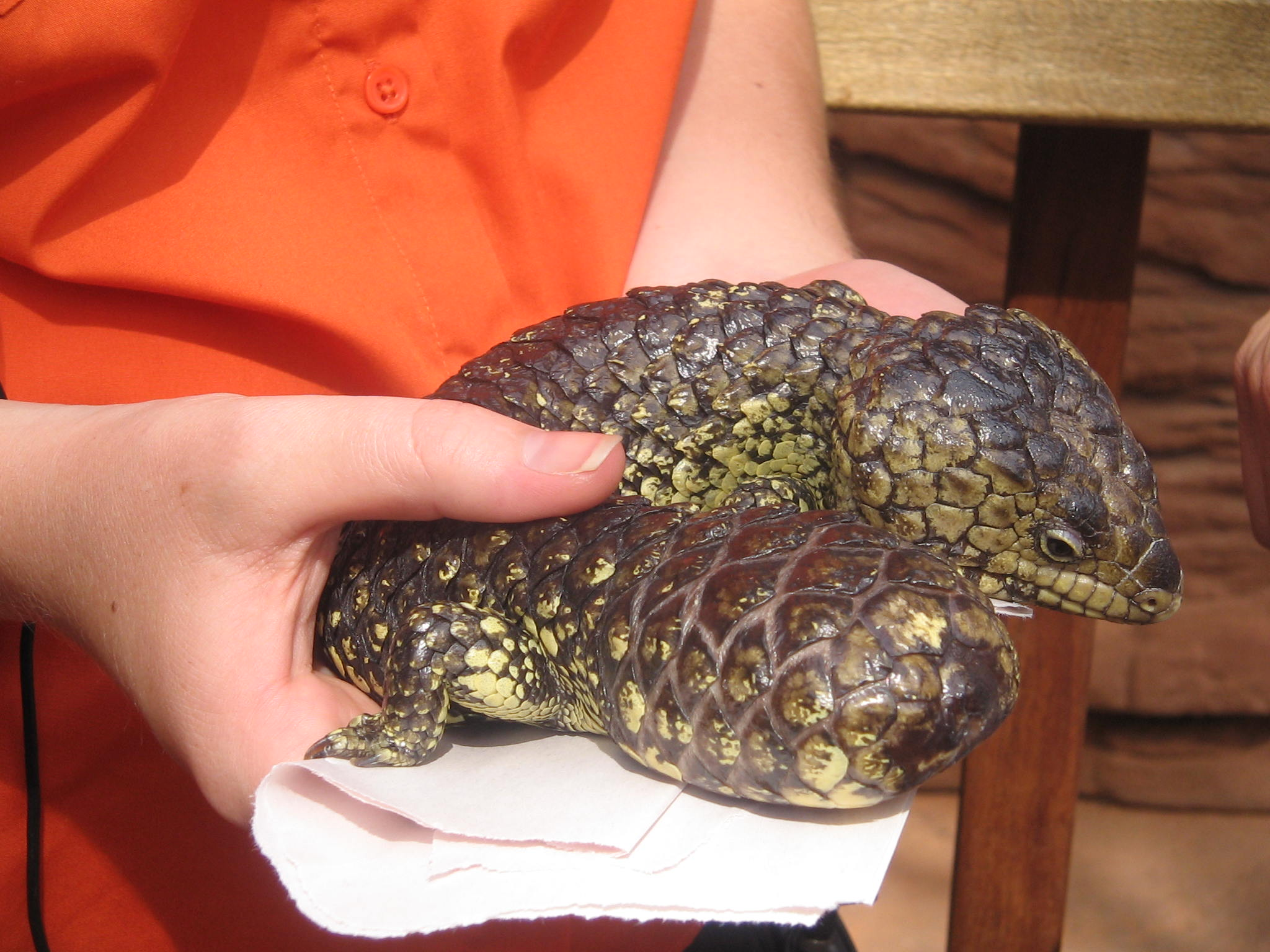
Shingleback lizard

It has a triangular head and a bright blue tongue, inside a bright pink mouth. Its short, stumpy tail is similar in shape to its head. This is probably a defence mechanism to confuse predators although it also stores fat and has led to the common name of "two-headed skink". Unlike many skinks, shinglebacks do not exhibit autotomy and cannot shed their tails.

The average lifespan for these skinks is 10 to 15 years, but some individuals have been known to live for as much as 50 years in the wild.

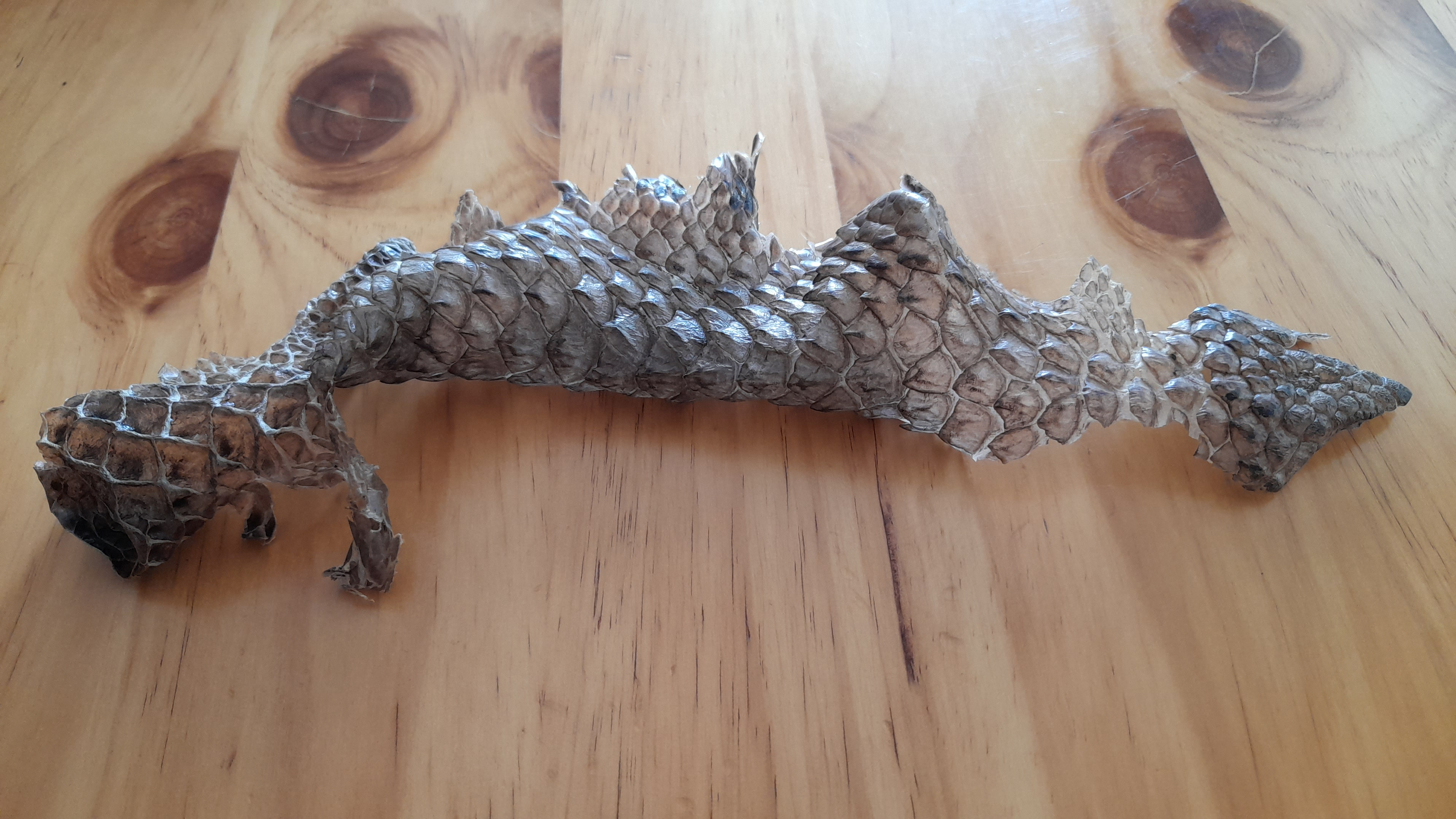
Shed skin, 37 cm long, head on right of image

The species normally shed their skin as a whole, including the eye covering. This takes up to several hours, during which the lizard rubs against objects to help the process.

The species exhibits sexual dimorphism, with males being stockier than females and having a larger head although females generally grow larger than males.

== Diet ==
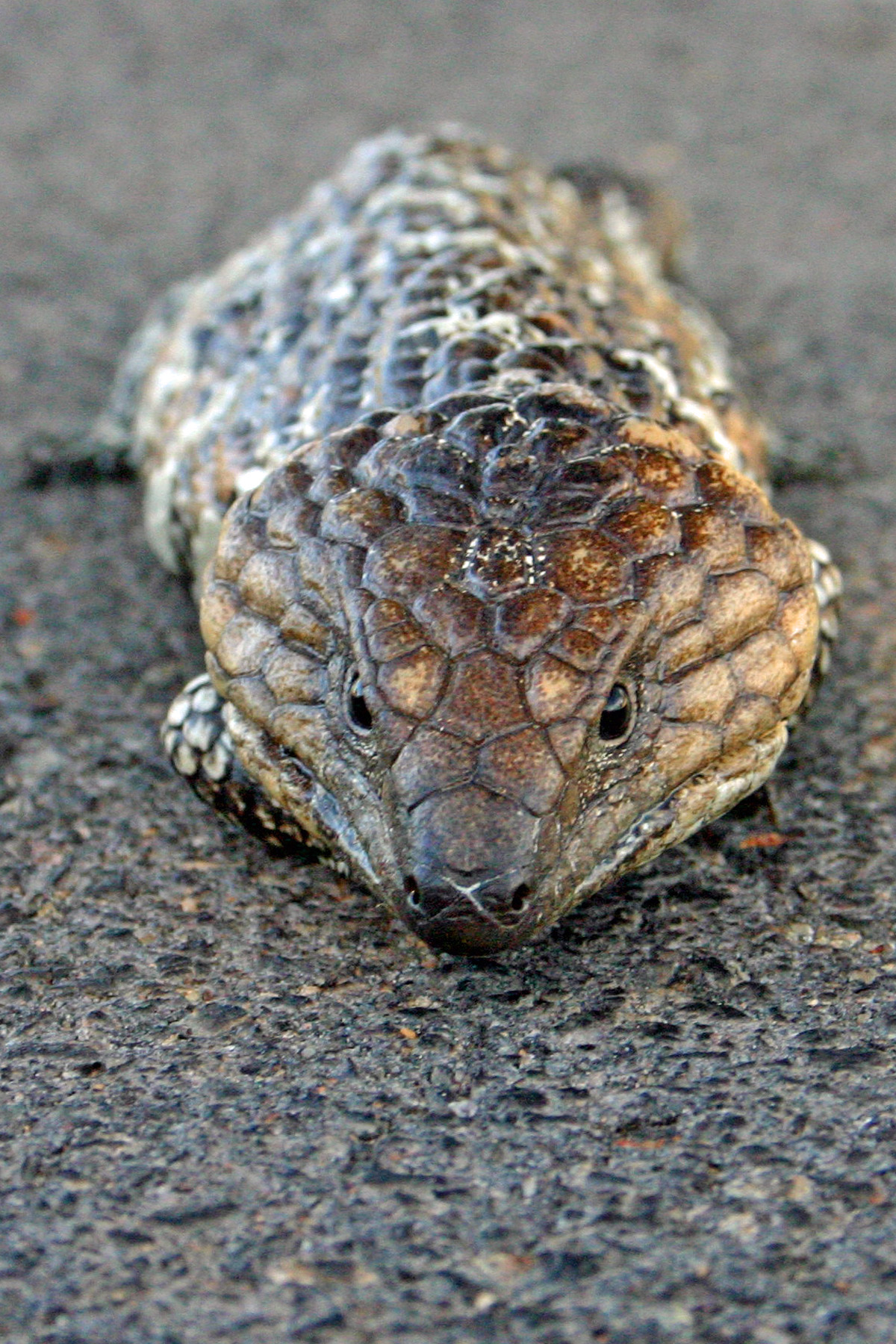
Front view

T. rugosa is an omnivore that eat snails, insects, carrion, vegetation and flowers. Since they are slow-moving, they tend to eat other slow moving species. This is perhaps why T. rugosa has a stronger preference for plants than other blue-tongue skink species. They can easily crush through the shells of snails with their strong jaws.

As they overlap with human habitation and settlement, they have also been known to eat human food, such as sausage and chicken, as well as fruits such as strawberries, banana and passionfruit.

== Behaviours ==
T. rugosa live a very sedentary lifestyle and generally act peacefully toward other individuals. However, these lizards are territorial and can display antagonistic behaviour towards conspecific intruders. They have stable home ranges and can differentiate between individuals through chemical cues. Familial neighbours who share home ranges and burrows do not show aggressive behaviour. However, unfamiliar males will be attacked by other males in occasional agonistic interactions. Observation of damage to scales has provided evidence that unpaired males are more likely to display antagonistic behaviour towards each other.

Captive specimens

They are floating males and thus wander many home ranges with male inhabitants. T. rugosa performs almost no parental care, so the observed monogamy is only advantageous premating.

=== In captivity ===
The shingleback skink has become a popular pet among Australian enthusiasts. They are relatively docile and easy to feed and maintain. A permit may be required to keep them in some states. Skinks will bite humans if threatened. These bites, although not venomous, will hurt like other animal bites and may cause the affected area to swell or bruise.

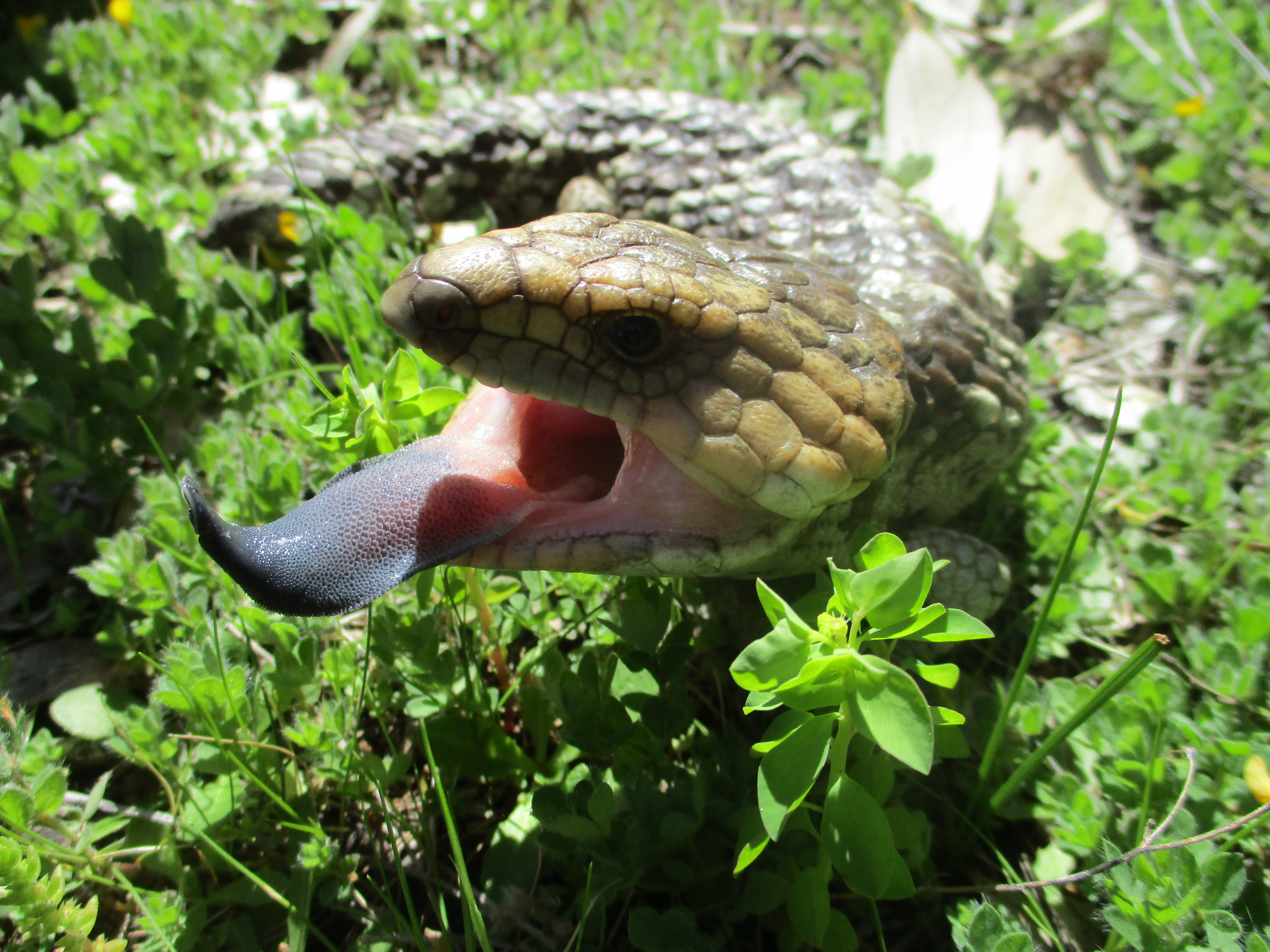
Threat display

== Predators ==
This species was once preyed upon by dingos and Australian pythons such as Morelia spilota, as well as by Aboriginal Australians; today the potential threats are more likely to come from large, introduced feral species such as foxes and cats. In the bush habitat in Western Australia, birds of prey like brown falcons and laughing kookaburras, and large snakes (such as eastern brown snakes, red-bellied black snakes and mulga snakes) will commonly prey on this skink.

Ticks and nematodes commonly parasitise this species by attaching under scales or in the ear. The kangaroo soft tick, Ornithodoros gurneyi, has been studied as an occasional parasite of Tiliqua rugosa, likely due to cohabitation of shrubs and leaf litter underneath trees where red kangaroos and wallabies shelter during hot summer days. While the red kangaroo is considered to be the primary host of O. gurneyi, it has been observed that larval and nymph ticks can parasitise T. rugosa and successfully develop to maturity. It is suggested that T. rugosa may play a role in dispersal of O. gurneyi as individual of this skink species have a relatively large home range, within which there may be several sites where host species interact.

T. rugosa has many performative defence mechanisms for predators. It tends to gape open its mouth and display its blue tongue, which is often accompanied by intense hissing. It has a harsh bite, which is used for defence if interactions worsen.

== Reproduction ==
T. rugosa is a viviparous skink meaning that its young are born live rather than being hatched from eggs as with most other lizards. Pregnancy and parturition are incredibly taxing on females. Relative clutch mass is 26.8% ±1.5% that of the mother.

Brood size may be from one to four — more usually two to three — relatively large offspring. The trade-off with small litter size versus large body size increases their survival chances. Females possess a well-developed placenta with which they feed their unborn young.

Unlike most other lizards the species tends to be monogamous and tend to re-unite in pairs during September to November prior to the breeding season. Pairs have been known to return to each other every year for up to 20 years. The breeding season is from December to April and the gestation period is usually 3–5 months.

When they are born, the young immediately consume their afterbirth. They stay with their parents for several months before becoming independent, but they remain in close proximity, forming a colony of closely related skinks.

The male of a monogamous pair eats less while parenting, remaining alert and ready to give an alarm. They will tail behind the female to protect them from rival males while the female fends for food.

== Socialisation ==
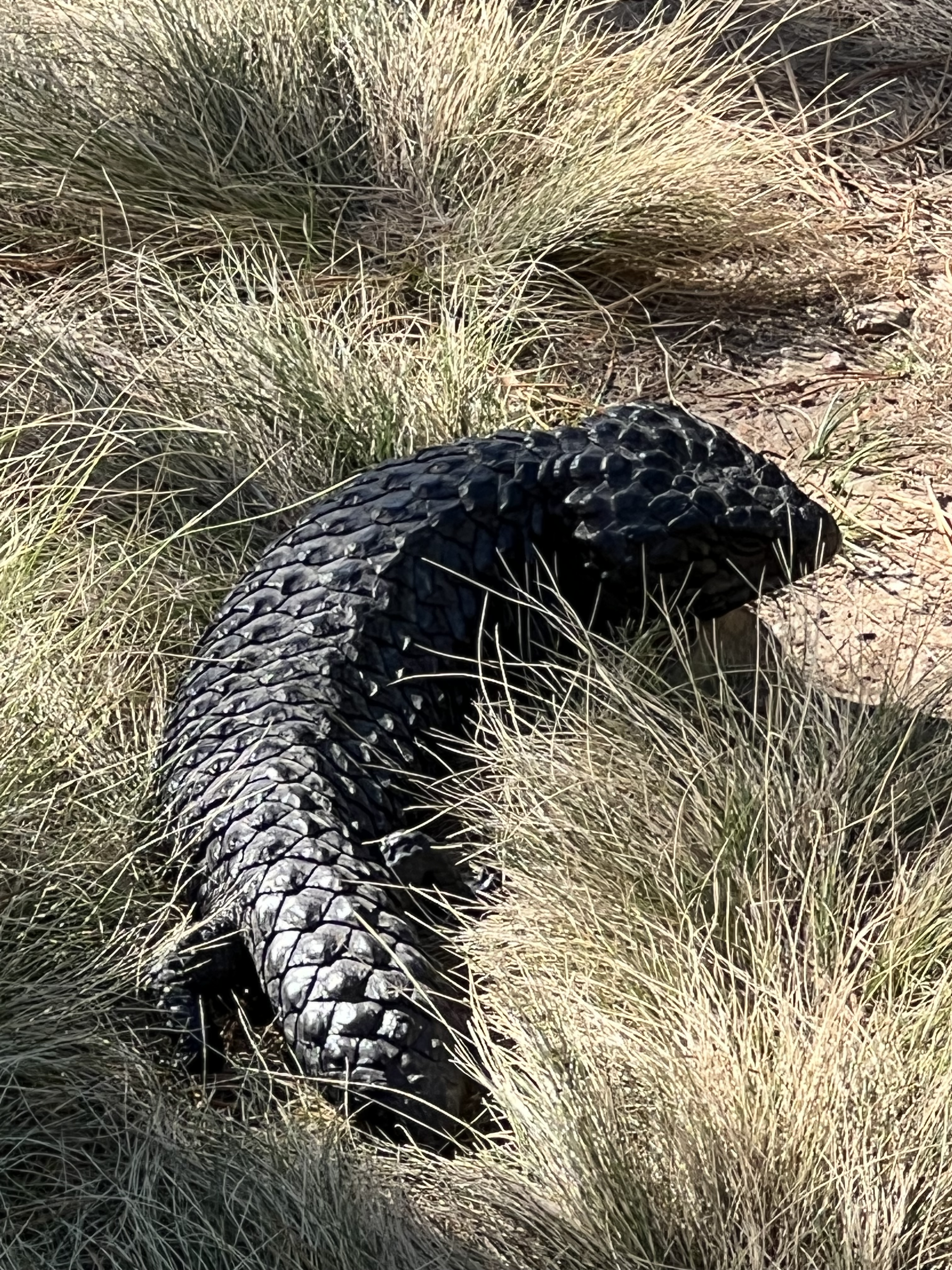
Tiliqua rugosa at Sparrow Hill, near Canberra

Forming monogamous pair bonds is a central facet of the bobtail lizard's life. Their excellent sense of direction allows the male to follow or pursue the female repeatedly, even outside of mating season. When one of the pair is killed, these skinks have even been observed grieving or brooding for their pair partner. Social monogamy is beneficial to female bobtail lizards more than males. This is why polyandry is seldom found but polygyny is more common. Females tend to prefer attentive males, and therefore hold the mating choice. Researchers have found that males have to prove themselves to the female by following them around for a couple of weeks before mating, to be selected as a mate. For this reason, females often prefer to stay with the same male in future years; they gain the value of consistency and confidence that the male will once again be attentive. Females that switch mate pairs some years have been found doing so when the male was less attentive in the previous year.

There are many reasons for why monogamy is especially popular in bobtail lizards. First, having two long-term pairs enhances parental care as there are two parents to watch after, fend for, and acquire resources for the offspring. Additionally, monogamy makes it easier for males to guard female home ranges. In polygamous setups, guarding multiple female ranges against other males proves to be difficult and wastes time and resources.

Extra-pair fertilisation, although more rare, tends to produce larger broods. However, the trade-off is that the female receives less attention in these setups, hence monogamy is most popular.

== Sensation and perception ==
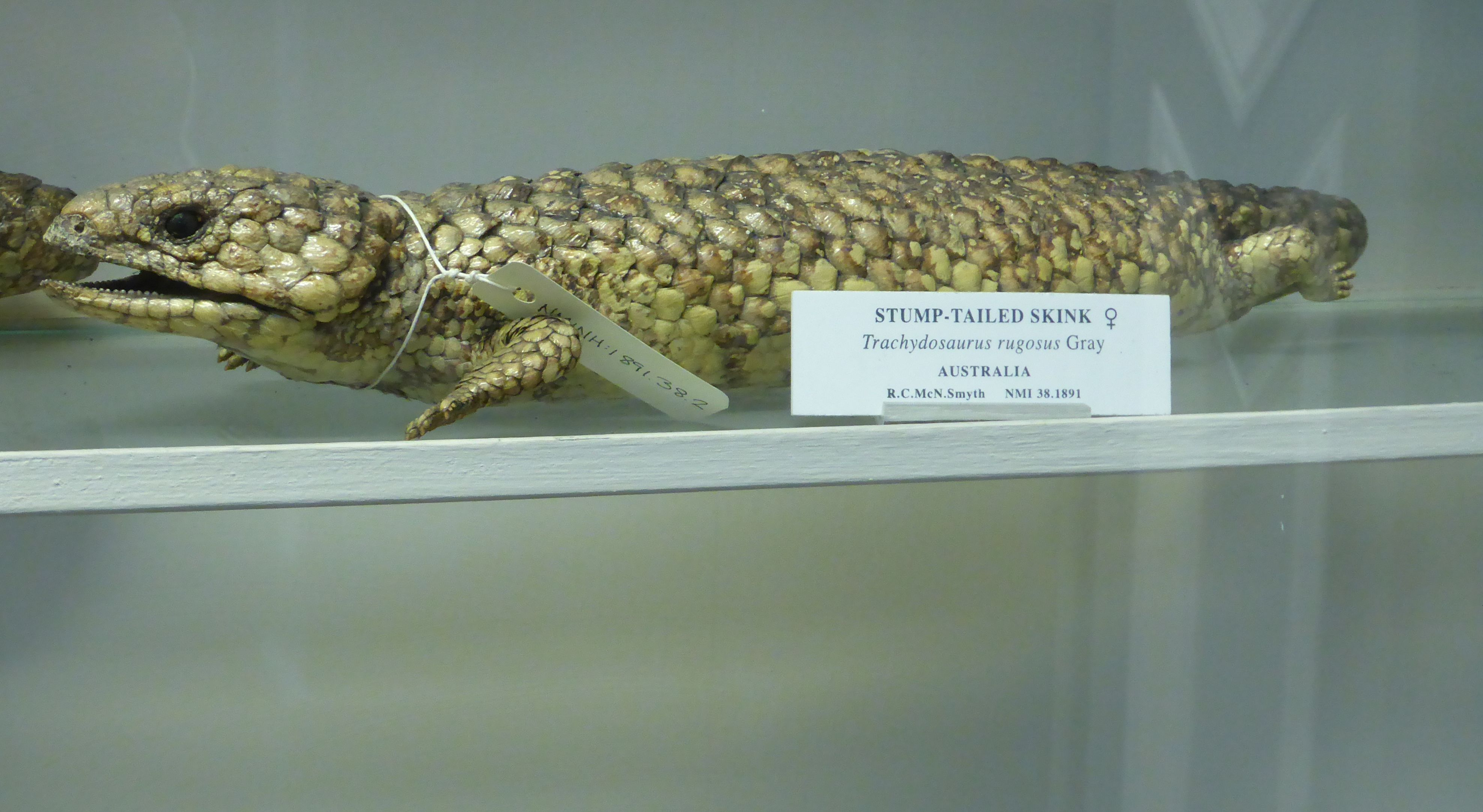
Tiliqua rugosa 1891 specimen in National Museum of Ireland - Natural History labelled as T. rugosus Gray

=== Hearing ===
Their hearing can be measured at the round window as cochlear microphonics and summating potential (of the cochlea), and compound action potential and single-fibre responses (of the auditory nerve). These indicate a best hearing range near 1000 Hz. Earlier reports that their hearing sensitivity varied with the season have been shown to be an artefact of the seasonally varying sensitivity to anesthetics.

Single-unit recordings from the auditory nerve show both spontaneous and nonspontaneous responses. Tuning curves show peak sensitivity between 200 Hz and 4.5 kHz. The absolute sensitivity is quite high, with some thresholds at 6 db sound pressure level, very close to human best sensitivity.

=== Olfaction ===
The sense of smell is crucial for this species avoidance behaviours. Living in bush lands that are so prone to fire means skinks have to easily be able to detect smoke. During studies, it was proven that T. rugosa engaged in more active behaviour such as pacing and tongue flicking in the presence of smoke. Scientists have concluded that fires are detected by their olfactory senses.

=== Visual perception ===
It has been discovered that bobtail lizards maintain the ability to navigate home when displaced from their home range. This remarkable ability is due to visual cues from light polarisation and ferromagnetic detection, forming a sort of "celestial compass" that provides the lizard a sense of direction when coming back home. However, this ability only persists until about 800 metres out of the home range, and further displacement distances means the skink is too far away to navigate.

== Conservation status ==
Under the IUCN Red List, Tiliqua rugosa is categorised as Least Concern. They are a protected species in Australia and can only be exported lawfully under a federal permit, but their import into and trade between other countries is not commonly illegal. Its population is stable and for the most part there are no significant threats. However, the subspecies T. r. konowi, located on Rottnest island, is considered Vulnerable.
