= Ogadenus =

Scientific classification
- Kingdom: Animalia
- Phylum: Arthropoda
- Subphylum: Chelicerata
- Class: Arachnida
- Order: Ixodida
- Family: Argasidae
- Genus: Ogadenus

Type species
- Ogadenus brumpti Neumann, 1907

Genus of ticks

Ogadenus is a monotypic genus of soft ticks belonging to the family Argasidae. It is one of six genera in the Argasid subfamily Argasinae. The genus currently only contains one species - Ogadenus brumpti, found in eastern and southern Africa.

Ogadenus brumpti is notable for its longevity - the species has the longest reported lifespan for any tick, and can live for eight years without food. The species is also among the largest argasid ticks, with females being 20 millimeters long, likely an adaptation to maximise water retention. These ticks do not cause disease or carry pathogens, but their bites can create long-lasting, painful lesions.
