= Navis (arachnid) =

Scientific classification
- Kingdom: Animalia
- Phylum: Arthropoda
- Subphylum: Chelicerata
- Class: Arachnida
- Order: Ixodida
- Family: Argasidae
- Subfamily: Argasinae
- Genus: Navis; Mans et al., 2019

Type species
- Argas striatus Bedford, 1932

Genus of ticks

Navis is a genus of ticks belonging to the family Argasidae. It is one of six genera in the Argasid subfamily Argasinae The genus is known from nests of sociable weaver birds in the Northern Cape, South Africa. The genus name is Latin for ship, as the tick's general shape, with parallel margins which round to a narrowed anterior, evokes the distinct appearance of a ship.

== Species ==
Navis currently contains 2 species:

- Navis aequalis (Neumann, 1901) (Note: The placement of N. aequalis may be tentative, as known only from a single nymph, which was described as Orthodoros aequalis Neumann, 1901 as being "male or nymph", then later Neumann, 1908 indicates it as a nymph after reviewing characters, saying (p.26) "comme il s'agissait d'une nymphe (pore génital ponctiforme)") – Tanzania (?) "Utengala"
- Navis striatus (Bedford, 1932)
