= Chiropterargas =

Scientific classification
- Kingdom: Animalia
- Phylum: Arthropoda
- Subphylum: Chelicerata
- Class: Arachnida
- Order: Ixodida
- Family: Argasidae
- Subfamily: Ornithodorinae
- Genus: Chiropterargas; Hoogstraal, 1955

Type species
- Chiropterargas boueti (Roubaud and Colas-Belcour, 1933)

Genus of ticks

Chiropterargas is a genus of soft ticks in the family Argasidae.

== Species ==
Chiropterargas is one of nine genera in the Argasid subfamily Ornithodorinae. The genus currently contains four species:

- C. (Chiropterargas) boueti (Roubaud & Colas-Belcour, 1933)
- C. (Chiropterargas) ceylonensis (Hoogstraal & Kaiser, 1968)
- C. (Chiropterargas) confusus (Hoogstraal, 1955)
- C. (Chiropterargas) cordiformis (Hoogstraal & Kohls, 1967)
