= Subparmatus =

Scientific classification
- Kingdom: Animalia
- Phylum: Arthropoda
- Subphylum: Chelicerata
- Class: Arachnida
- Order: Ixodida
- Family: Argasidae
- Subfamily: Ornithodorinae
- Genus: Subparmatus; Clifford et al., 1964

Type species
- Subparmatus viguerasi (Cooley and Kohls, 1941)

Genus of ticks

Subparmatus is a genus of soft ticks in the family Argasidae. Subparmatus species are known from bats in the Neotropical realm.

Subparmatus is one of nine genera in the Argasid subfamily Ornithodorinae. The genus currently contains three species:

- S. marinkellei Kohls, Clifford and Jones, 1969
- S. mormoops Kohls, Clifford and Jones, 1969
- S. viguerasi Cooley and Kohls, 1941
