= Australpavlovskyella =

Scientific classification
- Kingdom: Animalia
- Phylum: Arthropoda
- Subphylum: Chelicerata
- Class: Arachnida
- Order: Ixodida
- Family: Argasidae
- Genus: Australpavlovskyella; Barker et al., 2025
- Species: A. gurneyi

Binomial name
- Australpavlovskyella gurneyi (Warburton, 1926)

Synonyms
- Ornithodoros gurneyi Warburton, 1926

Genus of tick

Australpavlovskyella, is a genus of argasid soft tick belonging to the family Argasidae. The genus is monotypic containing a single species Australpavlovskyella gurneyi, the kangaroo soft tick. It is parasite found in arid regions of Australia, which may feed on red kangaroos, lizards and even people.

== Taxonomy ==
The species was originally described by Cecil Warburton as Ornithodoros gurneyi Warburton, 1926 in the journal Parasitology.

== Behaviour ==
Australpavlovskyella gurneyi is mostly known as a parasite of the red kangaroo (Osphranter rufus) and wallabies. The life cycle includes three to five instar stages before progressing to an adult. When not attached to a host, it resides in the soil of caves and the wallows made by kangaroos beneath shady trees. An investigation of its anecdotal reputation for biting humans reported one verified instance along with other records. In addition to mammal species, O. gurneyi is known to occur on the reptilian species Pogona barbata (a bearded dragon) and Tiliqua rugosa (shingleback or bobtail lizard). A study of bobtail lizards in captivity found the animal was a suitable host for this species, surviving and moulting, and may have a role in their dispersal to new sites.
