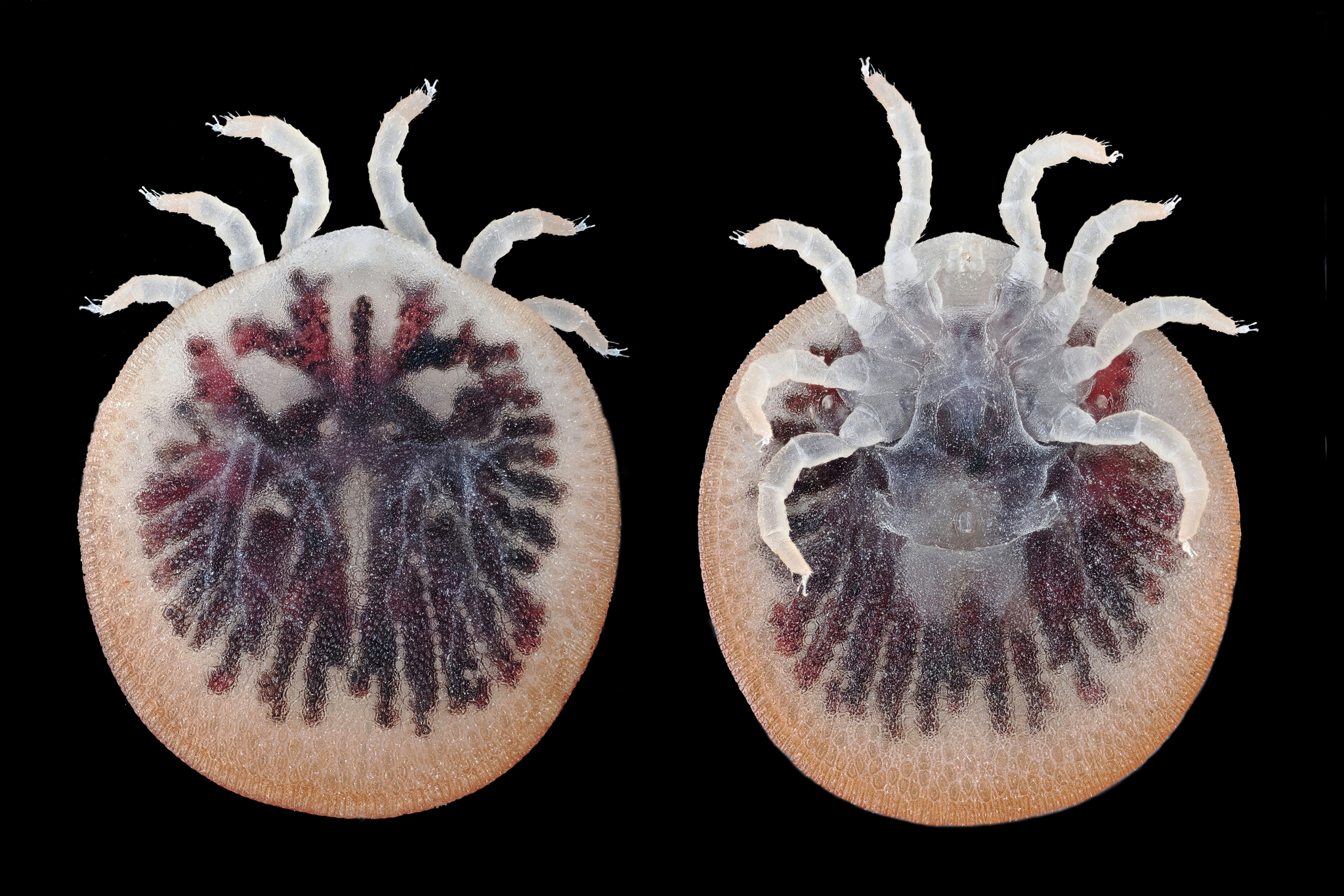

Scientific classification
- Kingdom: Animalia
- Phylum: Arthropoda
- Subphylum: Chelicerata
- Class: Arachnida
- Order: Ixodida
- Family: Argasidae
- Genus: Carios
- Species: C. vespertilionis

Binomial name
- Carios vespertilionis Latreille, 1796

Synonyms
- Argas fischeri Audouin, 1826; Argas vespertilionis Hoogstraal, 1958

= Carios vespertilionis =

Species of tick

Carios vespertilionis, also known as the short-legged bat tick, is an argasid tick parasite of bats. It is a widely-distributed species, found widely in Europe, Africa and Asia.

The species is usually host-specific to bats, especially Pipistrelles species, and is known to parasitise bats in all different types of transient colonies and roost types. However, it is a 'highly aggressive' parasite known to also readily bite domestic animals and humans. Studies in Sweden, Pakistan and the United Kingdom have identified that the species carries and can transmit human-pathogenic Borrelia bacteria in the relapsing fever group. They are also vectors of Babesia, Rickettsia and Ehrlichia bacteria species.
