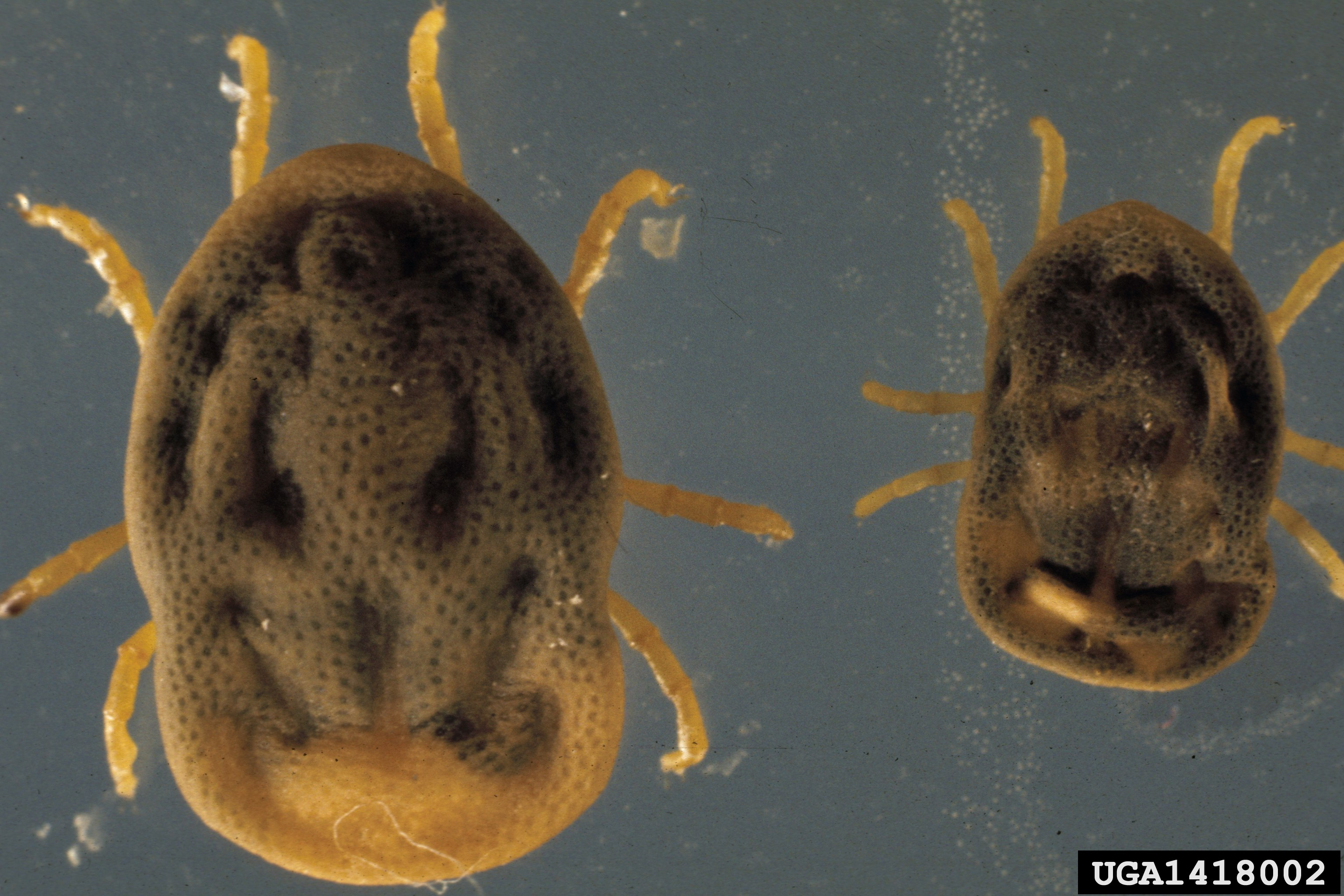

Scientific classification
- Domain: Eukaryota
- Kingdom: Animalia
- Phylum: Arthropoda
- Subphylum: Chelicerata
- Class: Arachnida
- Order: Ixodida
- Family: Argasidae
- Genus: Otobius
- Species: O. megnini

Binomial name
- Otobius megnini (Dugès, 1884)

= Otobius megnini =

Species of tick

Otobius megnini, also known as the spinose ear tick, is a soft-bodied tick that is only parasitic in the larval and nymphal stages. As its common name suggests, the spinose ear tick's parasitic forms are usually found within the ears of the definitive host. This tick has a worldwide distribution, with common hosts that include horses, cattle, sheep, goats, and dogs.

== Importance ==
Spinose ear ticks are a constant source of annoyance and irritation for their definitive hosts. Their tendency to occur in large numbers can cause ulceration of the inner ear, high sensitivity of the ears, large amounts of blood loss, and even deafness. Heavily infested animals often shake and rub their heads, which can cause their outer ears to become excoriated and raw. Several cases of human infestation have been reported, and the tick has been incriminated in some instances of pathogen transmission.

== Anatomy ==
As with many soft ticks, the mouthparts of O. megnini are not visible from the dorsal view. The nymph is somewhat violin shaped with tiny, backward-projecting spines covering the body, which are the reason for the description spinose in the common name. The adult may achieve 10 mm (0.4 in) in length, is brown, and has a slightly granular body cuticle. The male and female closely resemble each other; neither possesses a scutum.

== Habitat ==
Although spinose ear ticks are generally associated with semiarid or arid environments such as those found in the Southwestern United States, they can also be found in other climate areas due to widespread interstate transportation of animals. Larvae and nymphs usually remain within the ears of their host. Fully grown nymphs and adults live off the host, but still within the host's general environment. They usually prefer dry, protected places such as in cracks and crevices or under logs and fence posts.

== Lifecycle ==
O. megnini has a single-host lifecycle in which the larvae and nymphs remain deep within the external ear canal of their definitive host for long periods of time. The eggs are laid on or near the ground and hatch in 18 days or more. The larvae then crawl up vegetation, fence posts, or the like to wait for a host. They are capable of surviving without a host for more than 2 months. Once the larvae find a host, they migrate to the ears and feed for 5–10 days. They then molt and become nymphs, still remaining within the host's ear. The nymphs feed for about a month, after which they crawl out of the ear onto the ground to molt again and become adults. The nymphal stages can remain in the ear for 1–7 months, and adults can produce eggs for up to 6 months. Spinose ear tick adults do not feed; they absorb water from the atmosphere to survive.
