= Alectorobius =

Scientific classification
- Kingdom: Animalia
- Phylum: Arthropoda
- Subphylum: Chelicerata
- Class: Arachnida
- Order: Ixodida
- Family: Argasidae
- Subfamily: Ornithodorinae
- Genus: Alectorobius; Pocock, 1907

Type species
- Alectorobius talaje (Guerin-Meneville, 1849)

Genus of ticks

Alectorobius is a genus of ticks belonging to the family Argasidae.

== Species ==
Alectorobius is one of nine genera in the Argasid subfamily Ornithodorinae. The genus currently contains 64 species:

- A. (Alectorobius) amblus (Chamberlin, 1920)
- A. (Alectorobius) antiquus (Poinar, 1995)
- A. (Alectorobius) aragaoi (Fonseca, 1960)
- A. (Alectorobius) atacamensis (Muñoz-Leal, Venzal & González-Acuña, 2016)
- A. (Alectorobius) azteci (Matheson, 1935)
- A. (Alectorobius) brodyi (Matheson, 1935)
- A. (Alectorobius) capensis (Neumann, 1901)
- A. (Alectorobius) casebeeri (Jones & Clifford, 1972)
- A. (Alectorobius) cavernicolous (Dantas-Torres, Venzal & Labruna, 2012
- A. (Alectorobius) cerradoensis (Muñoz-Leal, Martins & Labruna, 2020)
- A. (Alectorobius) cheikhi (Vermeil, Marjolet & Vermeil, 1997)
- A. (Alectorobius) chironectes (Jones & Clifford, 1972)
- A. (Alectorobius) clarki (Jones & Clifford, 1972)
- A. (Alectorobius) collocaliae (Hoogstraal, Kadarsan, Kaiser & Van Peenen, 1974)
- A. (Alectorobius) concanensis (Cooley & Kohls, 1941)
- A. (Alectorobius) coniceps (Canestrini, 1890)
- A. (Alectorobius) cyclurae (de la Cruz, 1984)
- A. (Alectorobius) darwini (Kohls, Clifford & Hoogstraal, 1969)
- A. (Alectorobius) denmarki (Kohls, Sonenshine & Clifford, 1965)
- A. (Alectorobius) dugesi (Mazzotti, 1943)
- A. (Alectorobius) dusbabeki (Černý, 1967)
- A. (Alectorobius) dyeri (Cooley & Kohls, 1940)
- A. (Alectorobius) echimys (Kohls, Clifford & Jones, 1969)
- A. (Alectorobius) elongatus (Kohls, Sonenshine & Clifford, 1965)
- A. (Alectorobius) eptesicus (Kohls, Clifford & Jones, 1969)
- A. (Alectorobius) faccinii (Barros-Battesti, Landulfo & Luz, 2015)
- A. (Alectorobius) fonsecai (Labruna & Venzal, 2009)
- A. (Alectorobius) galapagensis (Kohls, Clifford & Hoogstraal, 1969)
- A. (Alectorobius) guaporensis (Nava, Venzal & Labruna, 2013
- A. (Alectorobius) hasei (Schulze, 1935)
- A. (Alectorobius) jerseyi (Klompen & Grimaldi, 2001)
- A. (Alectorobius) jul (Schulze, 1940)
- A. (Alectorobius) kelleyi (Cooley & Kohls, 1941)
- A. (Alectorobius) knoxjonesi (Jones & Clifford, 1972)
- A. (Alectorobius) kohlsi (Guglielmone & Keirans, 2002
- A. (Alectorobius) lahillei (Venzal, González-Acuña & Nava, 2015)
- A. (Alectorobius) maritimus (Vermeil & Marguet, 1967)
- A. (Alectorobius) marmosae (Jones & Clifford, 1972)
- A. (Alectorobius) microlophi (Venzal, Nava & González-Acuña, 2013)
- A. (Alectorobius) mimon (Kohls, Clifford & Jones, 1969)
- A. (Alectorobius) montensis (Venzal, Mangold & Nava, 2019)
- A. (Alectorobius) muesebecki (Hoogstraal, 1969)
- A. (Alectorobius) natalinus (Černý & Dusbábek, 1967)
- A. (Alectorobius) ocodontus Muñoz-Leal, González-Acuña & Venzal, 2020
- A. (Alectorobius) peropteryx (Kohls, Clifford & Jones, 1969)
- A. (Alectorobius) peruvianus (Kohls, Clifford & Jones, 1969)
- A. (Alectorobius) puertoricensis (Fox, 1947)
- A. (Alectorobius) quilinensis (Venzal, Nava & Mangold, 2012)
- A. (Alectorobius) rietcorreai (Labruna, Nava & Venzal, 2016)
- A. (Alectorobius) rioplatensis (Venzal, Estrada-Peña & Mangold, 2008)
- A. (Alectorobius) rondoniensis (Labruna, Terassini, Camargo, Brandão, Ribeiro & Estrada-Peña, 2008)
- A. (Alectorobius) rossi (Kohls, Sonenshine & Clifford, 1965)
- A. (Alectorobius) rudis (Karsch, 1880)
- A. (Alectorobius) saraivai (Muñoz-Leal & Labruna, 2017)
- A. (Alectorobius) sawaii (Kitaoka & Suzuki, 1973)
- A. (Alectorobius) setosus (Kohls, Clifford & Jones, 1969)
- A. (Alectorobius) spheniscus (Hoogstraal, Wassef, Hays & Keirans, 1985)
- A. (Alectorobius) stageri (Cooley & Kohls, 1941)
- A. (Alectorobius) tadaridae (Černý & Dusbábek, 1967)
- A. (Alectorobius) talaje (Guérin-Méneville, 1849)
- A. (Alectorobius) tiptoni (Jones & Clifford, 1972)
- A. (Alectorobius) tuttlei (Jones & Clifford, 1972)
- A. (Alectorobius) xerophylus (Venzal, Mangold & Nava, 2015)
- A. (Alectorobius) yumatensis (Cooley & Kohls, 1941)
- A. (Alectorobius) yunkeri (Keirans, Clifford & Hoogstraal, 1984)
