= Antricola delacruzi =

Scientific classification
- Kingdom: Animalia
- Phylum: Arthropoda
- Subphylum: Chelicerata
- Class: Arachnida
- Order: Ixodida
- Family: Argasidae
- Genus: Antricola
- Species: A. delacruzi

Binomial name
- Antricola delacruzi (Estrada-Pena, Barros-Battesti & Venzal, 2004)

Species of tick

Antricola delacruzi is a species of soft ticks in the family Argasidae, indigenous to the Brazilian rain forest. The species exclusively parasitizes insectivorous cave-dwelling bats of the Pteronotus genus. The species is only haematophagous as larvae, subsisting on bat guano as nymphs and adults. This behaviour is unique among soft ticks - Alectorobius amblus is found on sea bird guano, but all developmental stages are hematophagous.

The exact component of the guano that is consumed remains unclear, but it is rich in protein, iron and chitin, which the species' sialotranscriptome is compatible with. This unique diet exposes the species to viruses shed in the guano, many of which are previously undescribed Nairoviridae.
