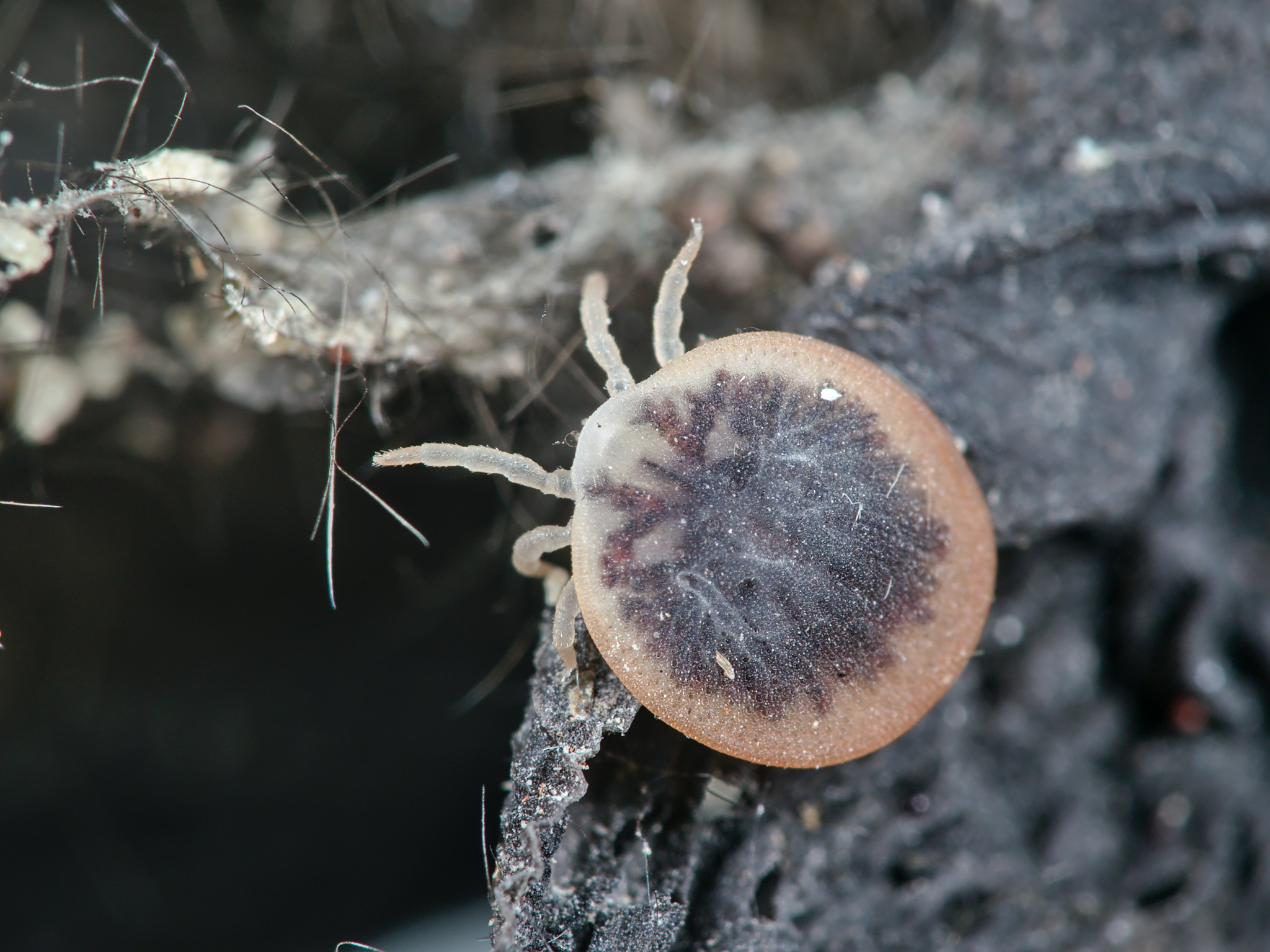
- Carios vespertilionis

Scientific classification
- Kingdom: Animalia
- Phylum: Arthropoda
- Subphylum: Chelicerata
- Class: Arachnida
- Order: Ixodida
- Family: Argasidae
- Subfamily: Ornithodorinae
- Genus: Carios; Latreille, 1796

= Carios =

Genus of ticks

Carios is a genus of soft ticks belonging to the family Argasidae. The genus has a cosmopolitan distribution.

== Species ==
Carios is one of nine genera in the Argasid subfamily Ornithodorinae. The genus currently contains 8 species.

- C. (Carios) australiensis (Kohls and Hoogstraal, 1962)
- C. (Carios) daviesi (Kaiser and Hoogstraal, 1973)
- C. (Carios) dewae (Kaiser and Hoogstraal, 1974)
- C. (Carios) macrodermae (Hoogstraal, Moorhouse, Wolf and Wassef, 1977)
- C. (Carios) pusillus (Kohls, 1950)
- C. (Carios) quadridentatus Heath, 2012
- C. (Carios) sinensis (Jeu and Zhu, 1982)
- C. (Carios) vespertilionis (Latreille, 1796)
