= Nothoaspis =

Scientific classification
- Kingdom: Animalia
- Phylum: Arthropoda
- Subphylum: Chelicerata
- Class: Arachnida
- Order: Ixodida
- Family: Argasidae
- Subfamily: Ornithodorinae
- Genus: Nothoaspis; Keirans and Clifford, 1975

Type species
- Notoaspis reddelli Keirans and Clifford, 1975

Genus of ticks

Nothoaspis is a genus of soft ticks in the family Argasidae.

The type species is Nothoaspis reddelli, which was distinguished by the presence of a false shield on the anterior half of its body.

== Species ==
Nothoaspis is one of nine genera in the Argasid subfamily Ornithodorinae. The genus currently contains three species:

- N. (Nothoaspis) amazoniensis Nava, Venzal & Labruna, 2010
- N. (Nothoaspis) reddelli Keirans & Clifford, 1975
- N. (Nothoaspis) setosus Kohls, Clifford & Jones, 1969
