= Robert Cooley (entomologist) =

American entomologist

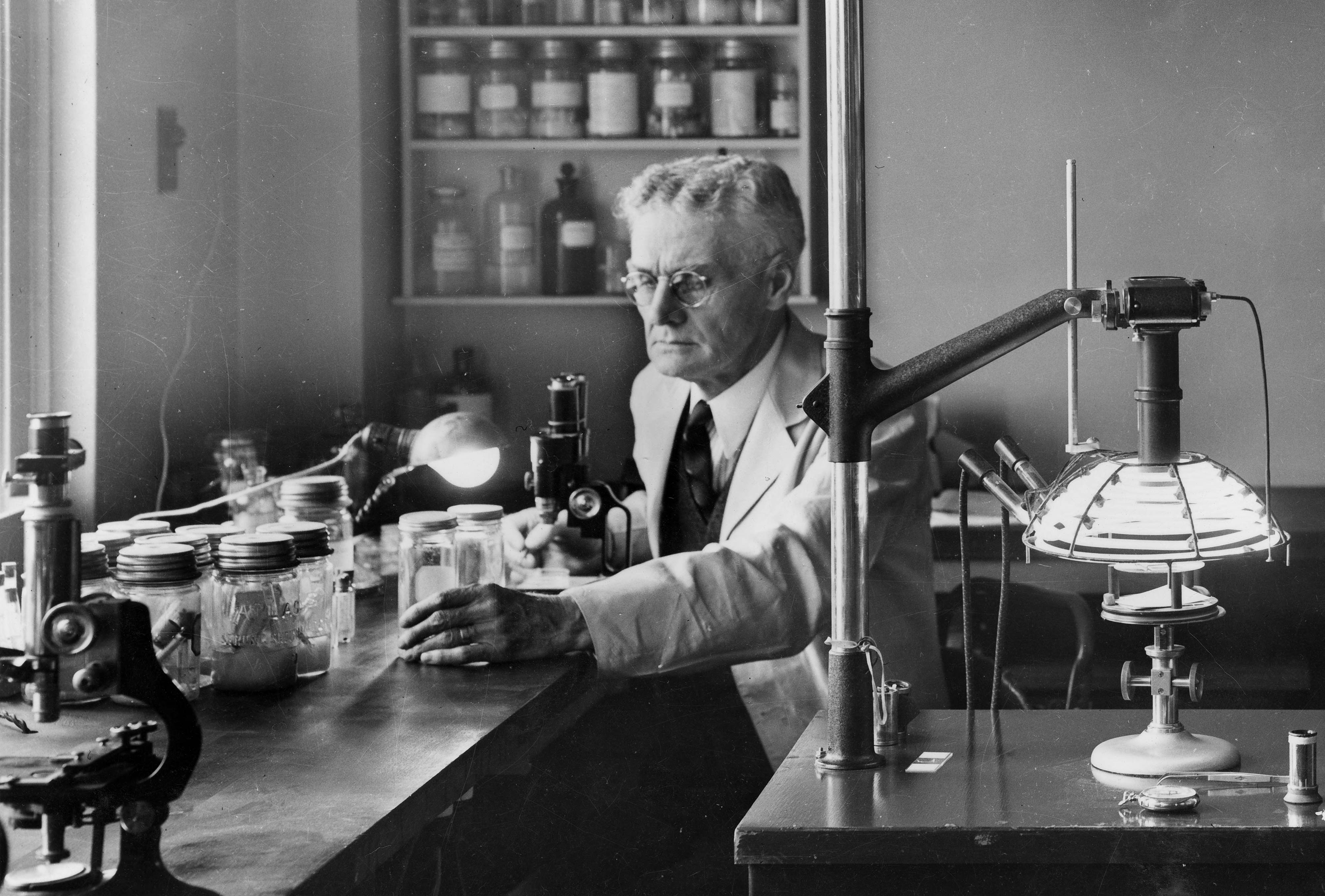
Robert A. Cooley at his work station at Rocky Mountain Laboratories in 1938

Robert Allen Cooley (27 June 1873 – 16 November 1968) was an American entomologist.

== Biography ==
Robert Cooley was born in Deerfield, Massachusetts and studied at Massachusetts Agricultural College. He worked at Montana State College and was appointed the first state entomologist for Montana in 1903. He worked on Rocky Mountain spotted fever, studying the life cycle of the tick that transmits the Rickettsia bacteria that cause the disease. He also worked on the eradication of the disease, and from 1931 until his retirement in 1946, he was head entomologist at the Rocky Mountain Laboratory in Hamilton, Montana, where the vaccine was developed. Cooley died at the age of 95 in Hamilton. The Cooley Laboratory at Montana State University is named in his honor. Robert Cooley is likely a descendant of the Mayflower passenger Francis Cooke via his daughter Mary.

== Sources and further reading ==
- Kohls, G.M.; Robert Allen Cooley, 1873-1968, J Econ Entomol. 1969 Aug; 62(4): 972. PMID 4902307
- 'Cooley, Robert Allen' (p. 270) in Volume 54 of The National Cyclopaedia of American Biography (1973)
- Jannotta, Sepp; Robert Cooley, The Montana State University Magazine: Mountains and Minds, 12 October 2012
- Robert Cooley, 125 Montana Newsmakers (Great Falls Tribune)
- Robert A. Cooley Residence in 'Bon Ton Historical District' (Montana History Wiki)
- Symposium to celebrate MSU's Cooley Lab renovation (Montana State University)
- Address Delivered on the Occasion of the Unveiling of the Gittinger-Kerlee Memorial (1929, Robert A. Cooley)
