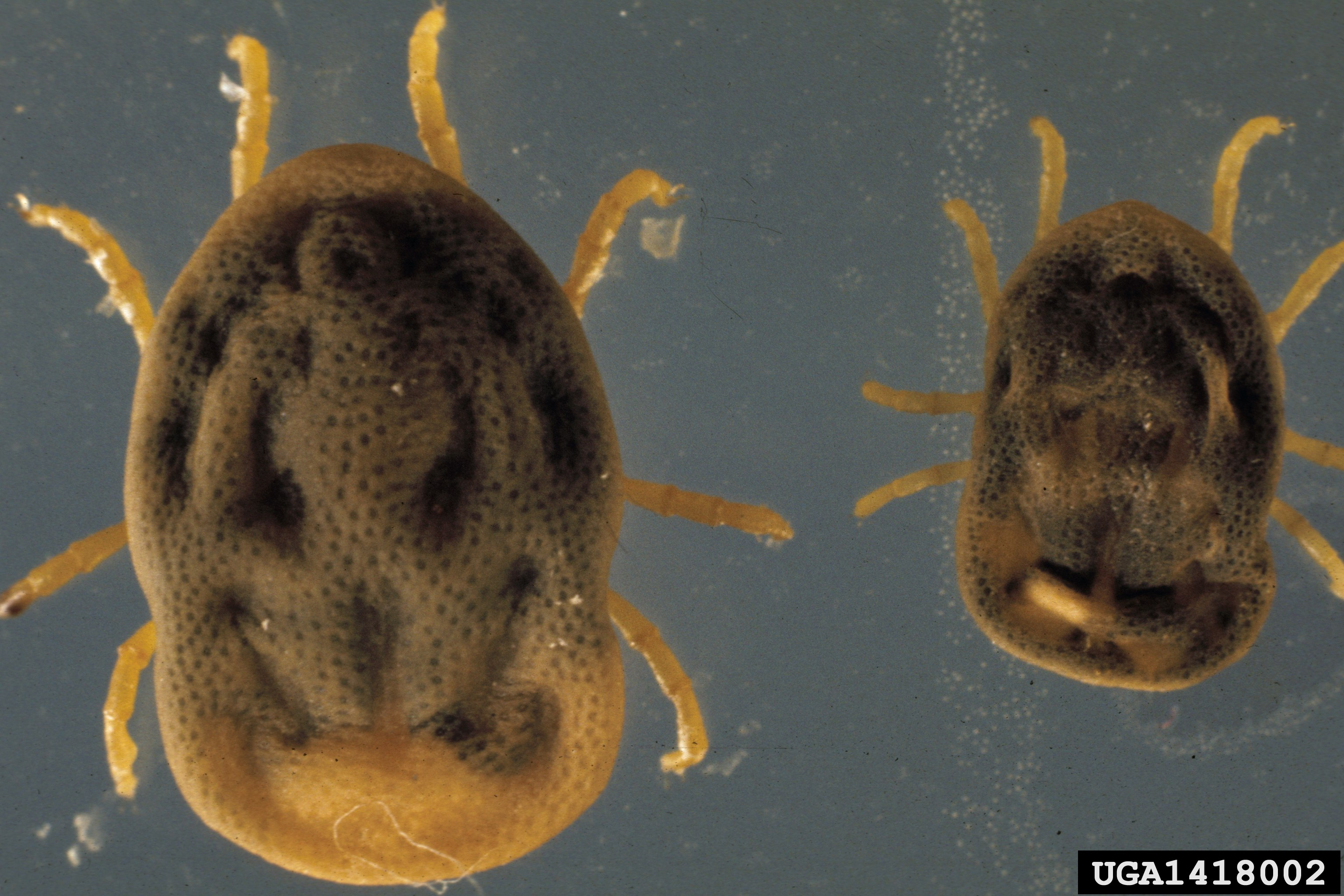
- Otobius megnini

Scientific classification
- Kingdom: Animalia
- Phylum: Arthropoda
- Subphylum: Chelicerata
- Class: Arachnida
- Order: Ixodida
- Superfamily: Ixodoidea
- Family: Argasidae; C. L. Koch, 1844

Genera
- Alectorobius; Alveonasus; Antricola; Apanaskevichiella; Argas; Australpavlovskyella; Carios; Chiropterargas; Navis; Nothoaspis; Ogadenus; Ornithodoros; Otobius; Proknekalia; Reticulinasus; Secretargas; Subparmatus

Diversity
- 17 genera, about 220 species.

= Argasidae =

Argasidae Temporal range: Cretaceous–present

Family of arachnids

The Argasidae are the family of soft ticks, one of the three families of extant ticks. The family contains 220 species, although the composition of the genera is less certain, and more study is needed before the taxonomy is resolved. The Argasidae are very common in South Asia, along with around 100 other species of ticks from other lineages, making South Asia the region with the highest biodiversity of ticks worldwide. Soft ticks are resistant to desiccation and can live for several years in arid conditions.

== Physical characteristics ==
Soft ticks lack the hard scutum present in the hard ticks (Ixodidae). The gnathosoma (or capitulum, the mouthparts-bearing structure) is located on the underside of the animal's body and is not readily visible, while in the Ixodidae, the gnathosoma projects forward from the body. The lateral edges of the body are rounded.

== Systematics ==
Argasid systematics remain in flux. There have been as many as four major conflicting taxonomic 'schools' over time, which all conflict in some way with contemporary molecular phylogenies. As such, there is an ongoing research effort to align finds from molecular systematics with pre-existing morphological based species constructs. As of 2025, the most up-to-date classification scheme and species list follows from Mans et al. (2021), comprising 220 taxa in 17 genera: (Note: Note 1: See the Supplementary material for complete species listings, in Mans et al. 2021 ("Appendix 1: Proposed revision for the Argasidae"), or earlier in Mans et al. 2019 ("Table S10: Revised species and subgenus classification for the Argasidae").)

Argasinae
Genera	Subgenera	# spp.
Alveonasus Neumann, 1908	(Alveonasus)	7
Argas Latreille, 1795	(Argas, Persicargas)	44
Navis Mans et al., 2019	(Navis)	1 (or 2?)
Ogadenus Neumann, 1907	(Ogadenus)	1
Proknekalia Keirans et al., 1977	(Proknekalia)	3
Secretargas Hoogstraal, 1957	(Secretargas)	3
		59

Ornithodorinae
Genera	Subgenera	# spp.
Alectorobius Pocock, 1907	(Alectorobius)	64
Antricola Cooley & Kohls, 1942	(Antricola, Parantricola)	17
Apanaskevichiella Barker et al., 2025		1
Australpavlovskyella Barker et al., 2025		1
Carios Latreille, 1796	(Carios)	8
Chiropterargas Hoogstraal, 1955	(Chiropterargas)	4
Nothoaspis Keirans and Clifford, 1975	(Nothoaspis)	3
Ornithodoros C. L. Koch, 1837	(Microargas, Ornamentum, Ornithodoros, Pavlovskyella, Theriodoros)	46
Otobius Banks, 1912	(Otobius)	2
Reticulinasus Schulze, 1941	(Reticulinasus)	12
Subparmatus Clifford et al., 1964	(Subparmatus)	3
		161

== See also ==
- Ticks of domestic animals
