= Xenolpium pacificum =

Scientific classification
- Kingdom: Animalia
- Phylum: Arthropoda
- Subphylum: Chelicerata
- Class: Arachnida
- Order: Pseudoscorpiones
- Family: Olpiidae
- Genus: Xenolpium
- Species: X. pacificum

Binomial name
- Xenolpium pacificum (With, 1907)

Synonyms
- Olpium pacificum With, 1907; Olpium zealandiensis Hoff, 1947

Species of pseudoscorpion

Xenolpium pacificum is a species of pseudoscorpion in the Olpiidae family. It was originally described in 1907 by Danish arachnologist Carl Johannes With, and subsequently remarked on by Austrian arachnologist Max Beier. The species occurs in New Zealand as well as on Australia's Lord Howe and Norfolk Islands. There are two subspecies.

== Subspecies ==
- Xenolpium pacificum pacificum (With, 1907) is found in New Zealand from North Island to Stewart Island, as well as on Lord Howe. It has been recorded from the supralittoral zone of beaches, beneath stones, in forest plant litter and in bird nests. The body lengths of males are 2.0–2.5 mm; those of females 2.5–3.5 mm.
- Xenolpium pacificum norfolkense Beier, 1976 is known only from Norfolk Island, from the male holotype which was collected from cow dung in the Bumbora Reserve. Its body length is 2.0 mm.
