= Gamasolaelaps multidentatus =

Scientific classification
- Kingdom: Animalia
- Phylum: Arthropoda
- Subphylum: Chelicerata
- Class: Arachnida
- Order: Mesostigmata
- Family: Veigaiidae
- Genus: Gamasolaelaps
- Species: G. multidentatus

Binomial name
- Gamasolaelaps multidentatus Karg, 1965

Species of mite

Gamasolaelaps multidentatus is a species of mite in the family Veigaiidae. It is similar to but larger than Gamasolaelaps excisus.
