= Dicrogonatus gardineri =

Conservation status
- Extinct (IUCN 3.1)

Scientific classification
- Kingdom: Animalia
- Phylum: Arthropoda
- Subphylum: Chelicerata
- Class: Arachnida
- Order: Holothyrida
- Family: Holothyridae
- Genus: Dicrogonatus
- Species: †D. gardineri

Binomial name
- †Dicrogonatus gardineri (Warburton, 1912)

Synonyms
- Holothyrus gardineri Warburton, 1912

Extinct species of mite

Dicrogonatus gardineri (common name: Gardiner's giant mite) is an extinct species of mite in the order Holothyrida, endemic to the Seychelles island of Mahé, where it was found in 1909. No other sightings have been recorded since, despite efforts to find it again in 2002 and 2011–12. This species became extinct due to the deterioration of habitation following the introduction of the cinnamon tree Cinnamomum verum.
