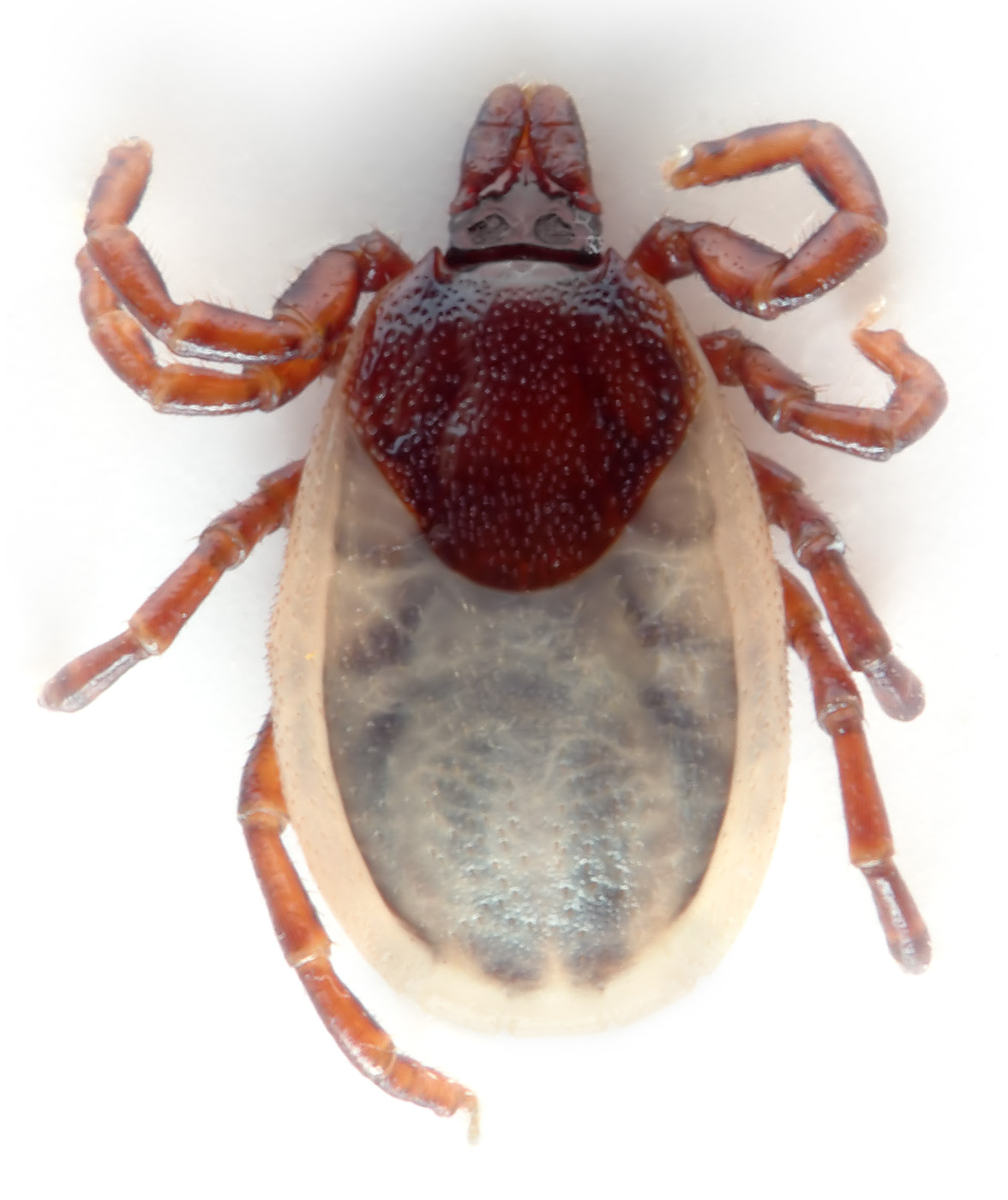
- An Ixodes hexagonus tick
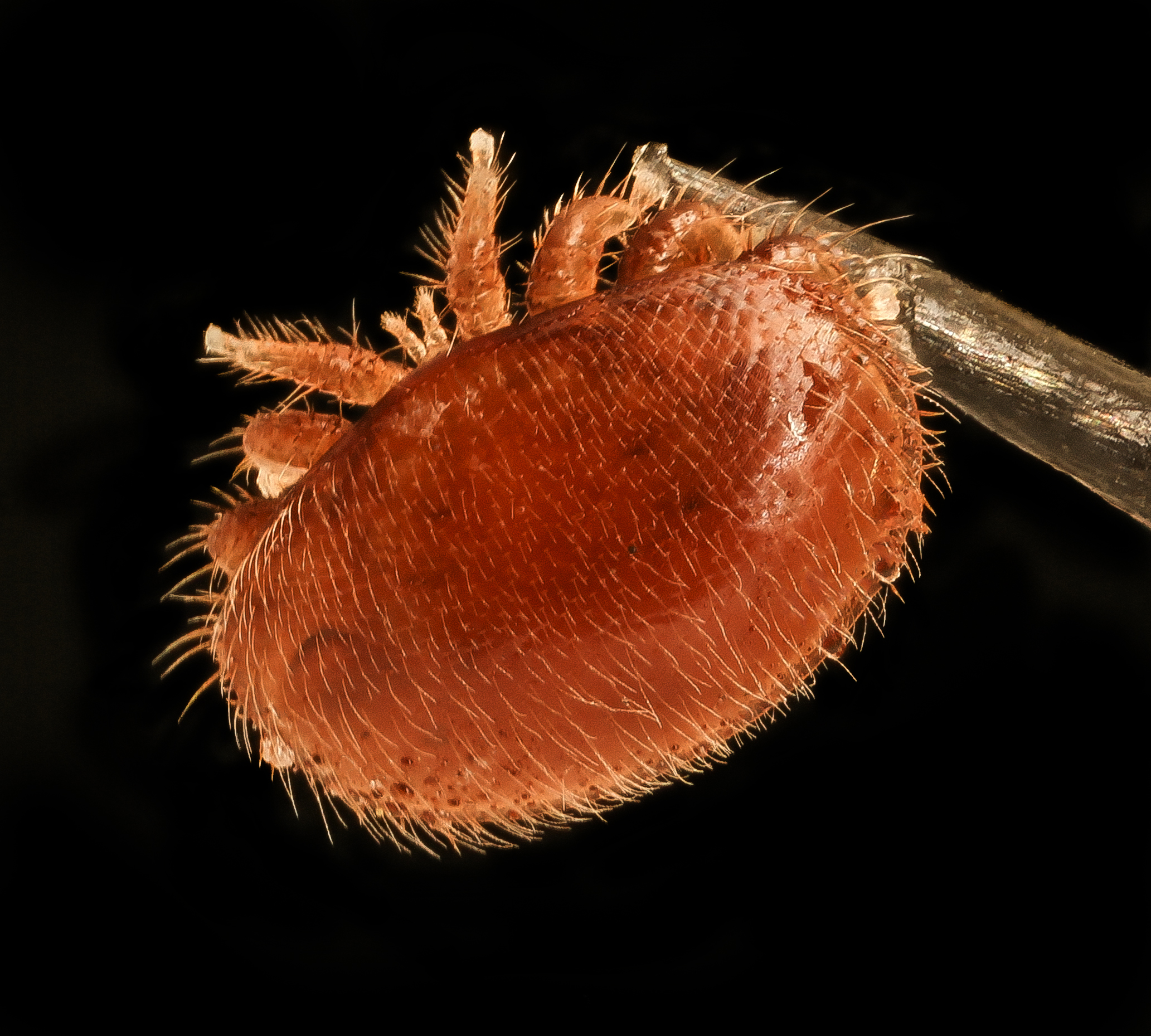
- Varroa destructor (Mesostigmata)

Scientific classification
- Kingdom: Animalia
- Phylum: Arthropoda
- Subphylum: Chelicerata
- Class: Arachnida
- Superorder: Parasitiformes; Leach, 1815

Orders and main families
- Ixodida; Argasidae (soft ticks); Ixodidae (hard ticks); Nuttalliellidae; † Deinocrotonidae; † Khimairidae; Holothyrida; Allothyridae; Holothyridae; Neothyridae; Opilioacarida; Opilioacaridae; Mesostigmata; over 130 families

Synonyms
- Anactinotrichida

= Parasitiformes =

Parasitiformes Temporal range: Cretaceous–present

Superorder of arachnids

Parasitiformes are a superorder of Arachnids, constituting one of the two major groups of mites, alongside Acariformes. Parasitiformes has, at times, been classified at the rank of order or suborder.

It is uncertain whether Parasitiformes and Acariformes are closely related, and in many analyses they are recovered more closely related to other arachnids. Amongst the best known members of the group are the ticks, though the Mesostigmata is by far the most diverse group with over 8,000 described species, including economically important species such as the varroa mite.

== Description ==
They are distinguished from the Acariformes by the absence of actinochitin and trichobothria. Non-opiloacarid parasitiforms lack visible segmentation and a dorsal transversal groove dividing the body, and possess sclerotized plates covering the anal opening, as well as a ring around the gnathosoma. The sperm transfer is considered indirect as it relies on a spermatophore instead of a penis.

== Evolutionary history ==
The oldest known fossils of Parasitiformes, representing three out of the four modern groups, Ixodida, Mesostigmata, and Opilioacarida, are known from mid-Cretaceous aged amber (including Burmese amber), dating to around 100 million years ago. Possible undescribed records have been reported from the slightly older Lebanese amber. They are suspected to have diversified substantially earlier. The genetic divergence between the groups is less than that of Acariform mites, suggesting a younger origin, likely dating to the late Paleozoic.

== Taxonomy ==
- Holothyrida - small group of scavenging mites native to former Gondwana landmasses
- Ixodida – ticks
- Mesostigmata – a large order of predatory and parasitic mites
- Opilioacarida – a small group of large, long-legged segmented mites.

Many species are parasitic (most famous of which are ticks), but not all. For example, about half of the 10,000 known species in the suborder Mesostigmata are predatory and cryptozoan, living in soil-litter, rotting wood, dung, carrion, nests or house dust. A few species have switched to grazing on fungi or ingesting spores or pollen. Phylogenetic relationships of the groups, after Klompen, 2010:

- - Parasitiformes
    - - Opilioacarida
    - - - Mesostigmata
      - - Holothyrida
        - - Ixodida

The phytoseiid mites, which account for about 15% of all described Mesostigmata are used with great success for biological control.

There are over 12,000 described species of Parasitiformes, and the total estimate is between 100,000 and 200,000 species.

The group may also be referred to as Anactinotrichida when the name Parasitiformes is restricted to the non-opilioacarid orders.

== Gallery ==
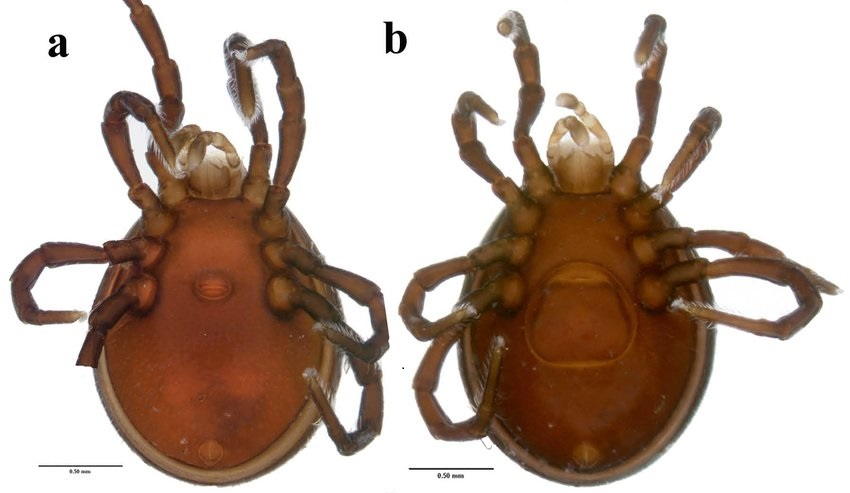
Ventral views of male (left) and female (right) of Diplothyrus lecorrei (Holothyrida, Neothyridae)

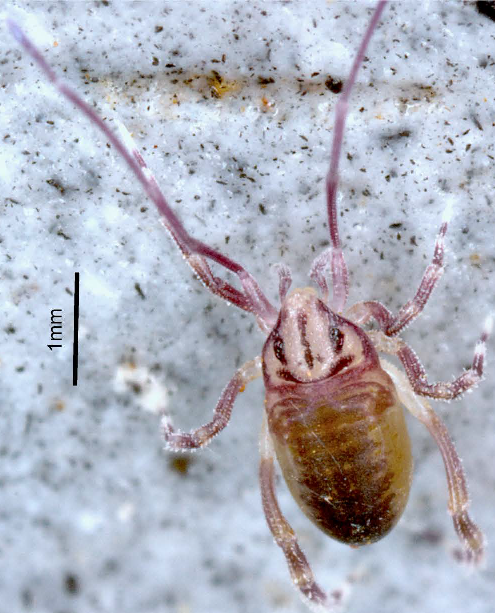
Specimen of Opilioacarus baeticus (Opilioacarida)

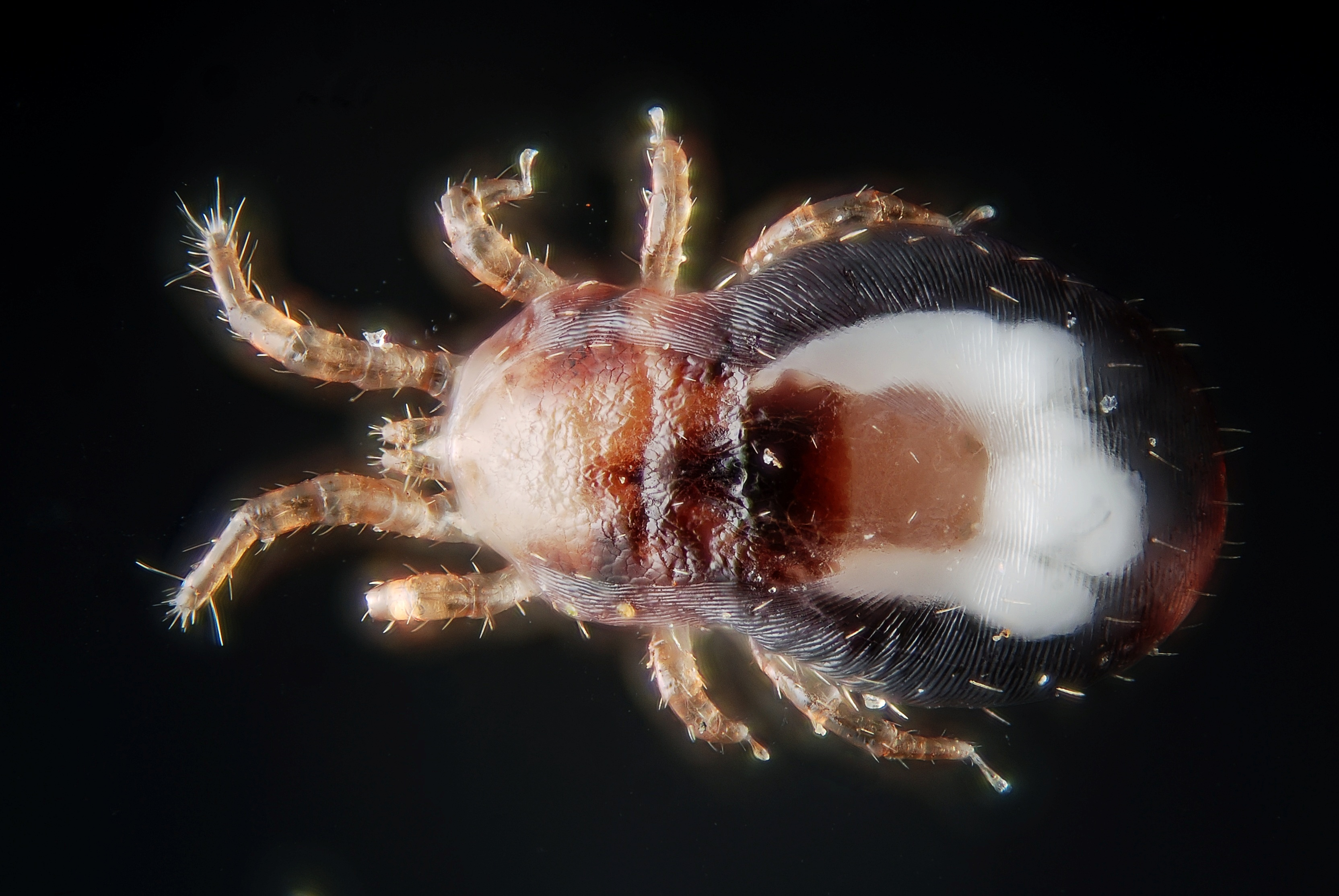
Specimen of Dermanyssus (Mesostigmata, Dermanyssidae)

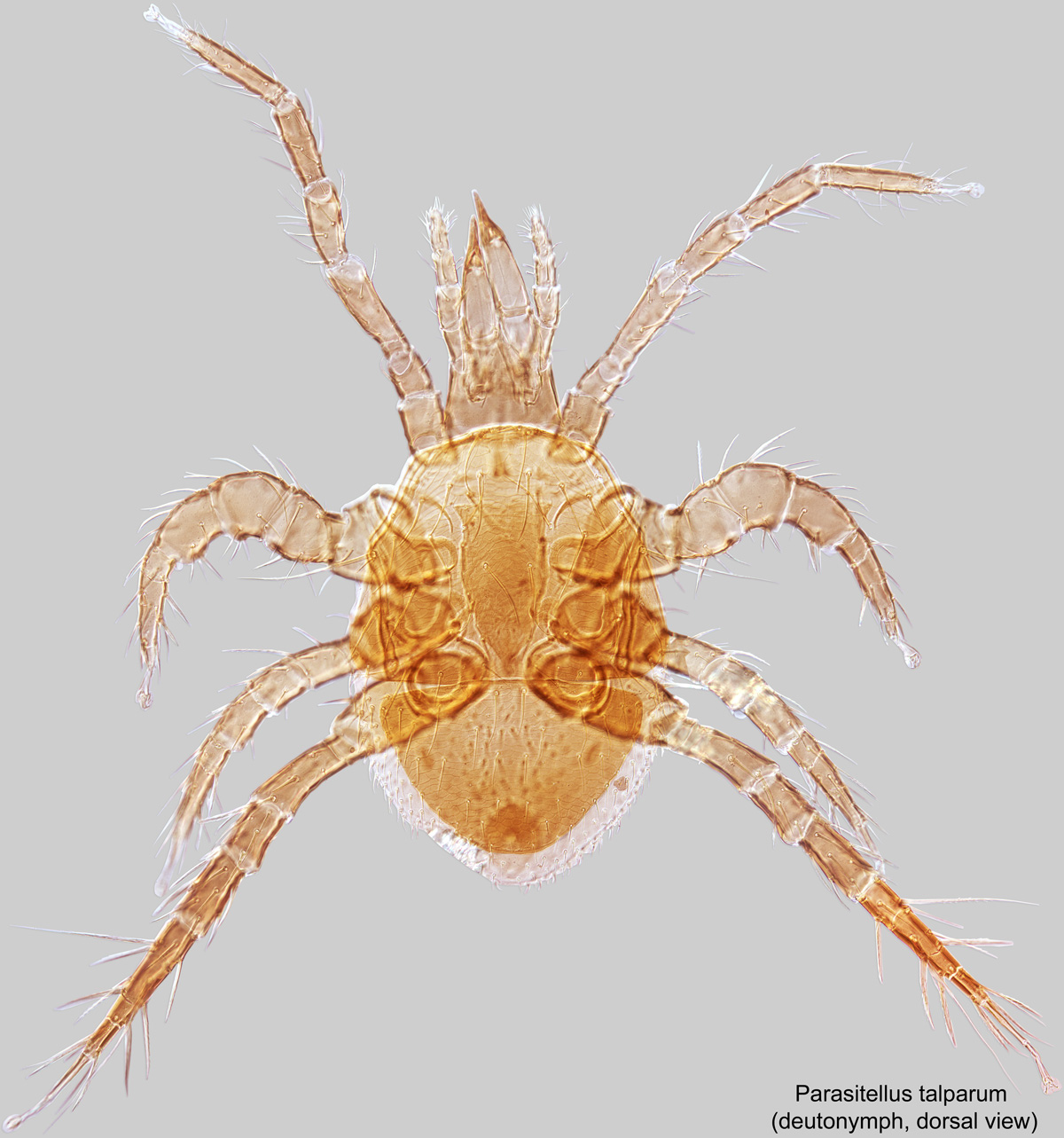
Specimen of Parasitellus (Mesostigmata, Parasitidae)

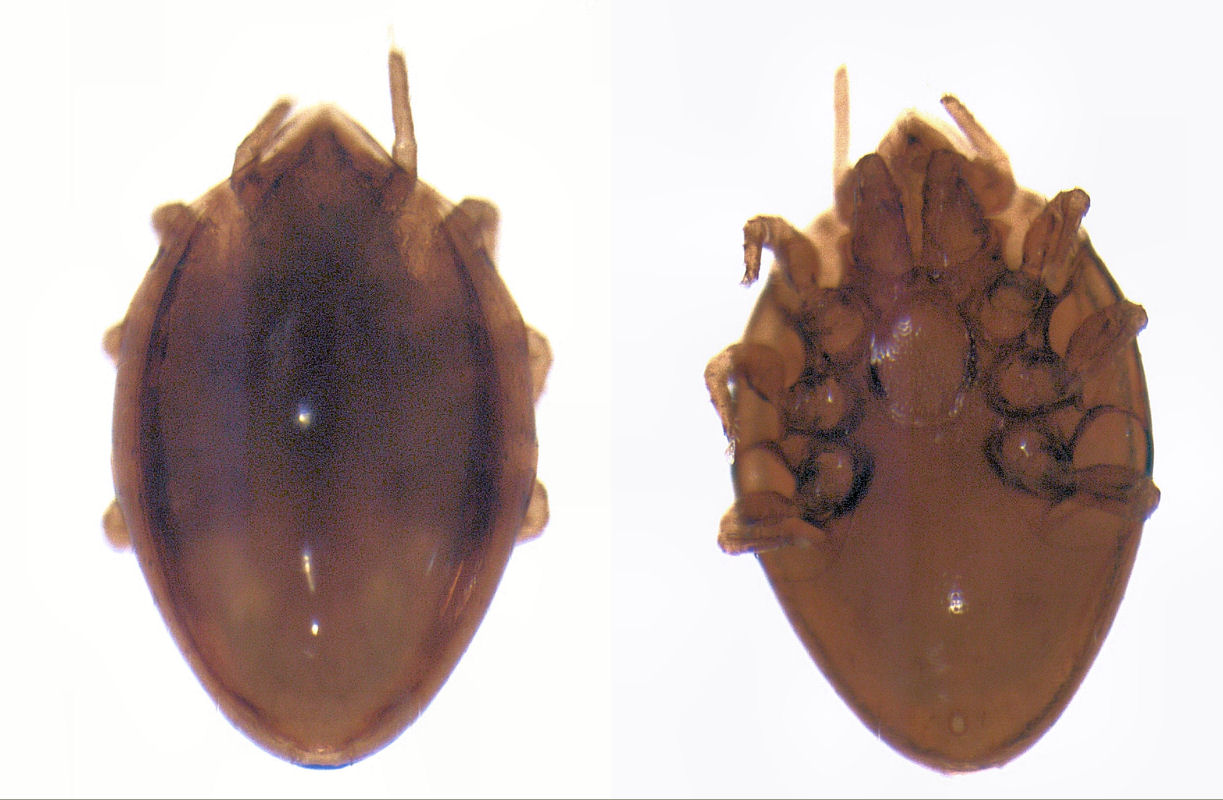
Specimen of Uroobovella (Mesostigmata, Urodinychidae)

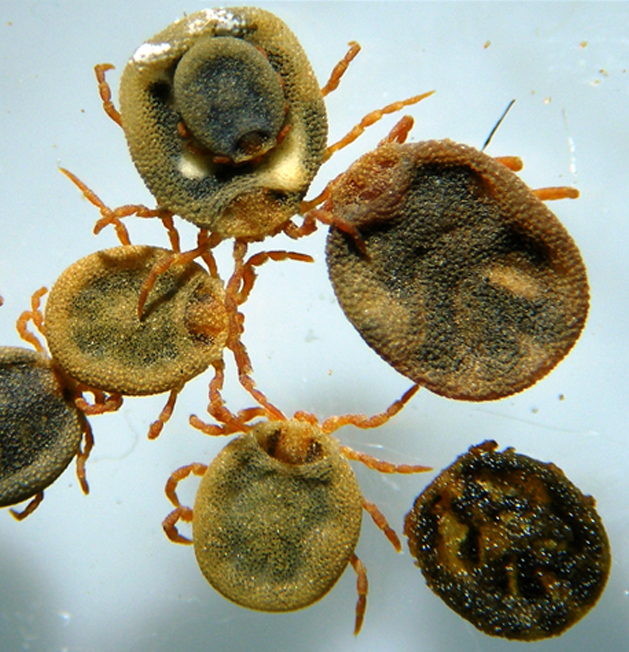
Specimens of Nuttalliella (Ixodida, Nuttalliellidae)
