= Veigaia hohuanshanensis =

Scientific classification
- Domain: Eukaryota
- Kingdom: Animalia
- Phylum: Arthropoda
- Subphylum: Chelicerata
- Class: Arachnida
- Order: Mesostigmata
- Family: Veigaiidae
- Genus: Veigaia
- Species: V. hohuanshanensis

Binomial name
- Veigaia hohuanshanensis Tseng, 1994

Species of mite

Veigaia hohuanshanensis is a species of mite in the family Veigaiidae.
