= Cyrthydrolaelaps hirtus =

Scientific classification
- Domain: Eukaryota
- Kingdom: Animalia
- Phylum: Arthropoda
- Subphylum: Chelicerata
- Class: Arachnida
- Order: Mesostigmata
- Family: Veigaiidae
- Genus: Cyrthydrolaelaps
- Species: C. hirtus

Binomial name
- Cyrthydrolaelaps hirtus Berlese, 1905

Species of mite

Cyrthydrolaelaps hirtus is a species of mite in the family Veigaiidae.
