= Euryolpium michaelseni =

Scientific classification
- Kingdom: Animalia
- Phylum: Arthropoda
- Subphylum: Chelicerata
- Class: Arachnida
- Order: Pseudoscorpiones
- Family: Olpiidae
- Genus: Euryolpium
- Species: E. michaelseni

Binomial name
- Euryolpium michaelseni (Tullgren, 1909)

Synonyms
- Olpium michaelseni Tullgren, 1909

Species of pseudoscorpion

Euryolpium michaelseni is a species of pseudoscorpion in the Olpiidae family. It is endemic to Australia. It was described in 1909 by Swedish arachnologist Albert Tullgren.

== Distribution and habitat ==
The species occurs in Western Australia. The type locality is Yalgoo in the Mid West region. It has also been recorded from New South Wales. The pseudoscorpions inhabit plant litter.

== Behaviour ==
The pseudoscorpions are terrestrial predators.
