= Euryolpium granulosum =

Scientific classification
- Kingdom: Animalia
- Phylum: Arthropoda
- Subphylum: Chelicerata
- Class: Arachnida
- Order: Pseudoscorpiones
- Family: Olpiidae
- Genus: Euryolpium
- Species: E. granulosum

Binomial name
- Euryolpium granulosum (Hoff, 1947)

Synonyms
- Xenolpium granulosum Hoff, 1947; Xenolpium robustum Beier, 1948

Species of pseudoscorpion

Euryolpium granulosum is a species of pseudoscorpion in the Olpiidae family. It is endemic to Australia. It was described in 1947 by American arachnologist Clarence Clayton Hoff.

== Description ==
The holotype female from Mullewa has a body length of 4.65 mm. The colour is mainly light brown, the chelicerae darker, the pedipalps deep reddish-brown, and the legs deep yellow.

== Distribution and habitat ==
The species occurs in Western Australia. The type locality is Mullewa in the Mid West region. It has also been recorded from Pender Bay on the Dampier Peninsula.

== Behaviour ==
The pseudoscorpions are terrestrial predators.
