= V. exigua =

V. exigua may refer to:

- Veigaia exigua, a non-parasitic mite
- Velleia exigua, an Oceanian herb
