= Xenolpium longiventer =

Scientific classification
- Kingdom: Animalia
- Phylum: Arthropoda
- Subphylum: Chelicerata
- Class: Arachnida
- Order: Pseudoscorpiones
- Family: Olpiidae
- Genus: Xenolpium
- Species: X. longiventer

Binomial name
- Xenolpium longiventer (Koch & Keyserling, 1885)

Synonyms
- Olpium longiventer Koch & Keyerling, 1885

Species of pseudoscorpion

Xenolpium longiventer is a species of pseudoscorpion in the Olpiidae family. It is endemic to Australia. It was described in 1885 by German arachnologists Ludwig Carl Christian Koch and Eugen von Keyserling.

== Distribution and habitat ==
The species occurs in Queensland, Tasmania and Victoria. The type locality is Peak Downs in Queensland's Central Highlands Region. The pseudoscorpions inhabit plant litter.

== Behaviour ==
The pseudoscorpions are terrestrial predators.
