= Olpium australicum =

Scientific classification
- Kingdom: Animalia
- Phylum: Arthropoda
- Subphylum: Chelicerata
- Class: Arachnida
- Order: Pseudoscorpiones
- Family: Olpiidae
- Genus: Olpium
- Species: O. australicum

Binomial name
- Olpium australicum Beier, 1969

Species of pseudoscorpion

Olpium australicum is a species of pseudoscorpion in the Olpiidae family. It is endemic to Australia. It was described in 1969 by Austrian arachnologist Max Beier.

== Distribution and habitat ==
The species occurs in Western Australia and South Australia. The type locality is Madura on the Eyre Highway in the Roe Plains. The pseudoscorpions inhabit plant litter.

== Behaviour ==
The pseudoscorpions are terrestrial predators.
