= Veigaia cerva =

Scientific classification
- Domain: Eukaryota
- Kingdom: Animalia
- Phylum: Arthropoda
- Subphylum: Chelicerata
- Class: Arachnida
- Order: Mesostigmata
- Family: Veigaiidae
- Genus: Veigaia
- Species: V. cerva

Binomial name
- Veigaia cerva (P.Kramer, 1876)

Species of mite

Veigaia cerva is a species of mite in the family Veigaiidae. It is found in Europe.
