= Gamasolaelaps bellingeri =

Scientific classification
- Domain: Eukaryota
- Kingdom: Animalia
- Phylum: Arthropoda
- Subphylum: Chelicerata
- Class: Arachnida
- Order: Mesostigmata
- Family: Veigaiidae
- Genus: Gamasolaelaps
- Species: G. bellingeri

Binomial name
- Gamasolaelaps bellingeri Evans, 1959

Species of mite

Gamasolaelaps bellingeri is a species of mite belonging to the family Veigaiidae. The female is only 0.5 mm in length, the male even smaller. Both can be recognized by the dorsal sclerotized shield being deeply incised laterally. This species is found in damp habitats such as moss and leaf litter in Jamaica.
