= Gamasolaelaps whartoni =

Scientific classification
- Kingdom: Animalia
- Phylum: Arthropoda
- Subphylum: Chelicerata
- Class: Arachnida
- Order: Mesostigmata
- Family: Veigaiidae
- Genus: Gamasolaelaps
- Species: G. whartoni

Binomial name
- Gamasolaelaps whartoni, 1957 (Farrier)

Species of mite

Gamasolaelaps whartoni is a species of mite in the family Veigaiidae.
