= Gamasolaelaps pygmaeus =

Scientific classification
- Domain: Eukaryota
- Kingdom: Animalia
- Phylum: Arthropoda
- Subphylum: Chelicerata
- Class: Arachnida
- Order: Mesostigmata
- Family: Veigaiidae
- Genus: Gamasolaelaps
- Species: G. pygmaeus

Binomial name
- Gamasolaelaps pygmaeus Bregetova, 1961

Species of mite

Gamasolaelaps pygmaeus is a species of mite in the family Veigaiidae.
