= Calocheiridius elegans =

Scientific classification
- Domain: Eukaryota
- Kingdom: Animalia
- Phylum: Arthropoda
- Subphylum: Chelicerata
- Class: Arachnida
- Order: Pseudoscorpiones
- Family: Olpiidae
- Genus: Calocheiridius
- Species: C. elegans

Binomial name
- Calocheiridius elegans Murthy & Ananthakrishnan, 1977

Subspecies
- Calocheiridius elegans elegans; Calocheiridius elegans pallens

Species of pseudoscorpion

Calocheiridius elegans is a species of pseudoscorpion in the genus Calocheiridius. It is found in India.
