= Veigaia planicola =

Scientific classification
- Domain: Eukaryota
- Kingdom: Animalia
- Phylum: Arthropoda
- Subphylum: Chelicerata
- Class: Arachnida
- Order: Mesostigmata
- Family: Veigaiidae
- Genus: Veigaia
- Species: V. planicola

Binomial name
- Veigaia planicola (A.Berlese, 1892)

Species of mite

Veigaia planicola is a species of mite in the family Veigaiidae. It is found in Europe.
