= Veigaia formosana =

Scientific classification
- Domain: Eukaryota
- Kingdom: Animalia
- Phylum: Arthropoda
- Subphylum: Chelicerata
- Class: Arachnida
- Order: Mesostigmata
- Family: Veigaiidae
- Genus: Veigaia
- Species: V. formosana

Binomial name
- Veigaia formosana Tseng, 1994

Species of mite

Veigaia formosana is a species of mite in the family Veigaiidae.
