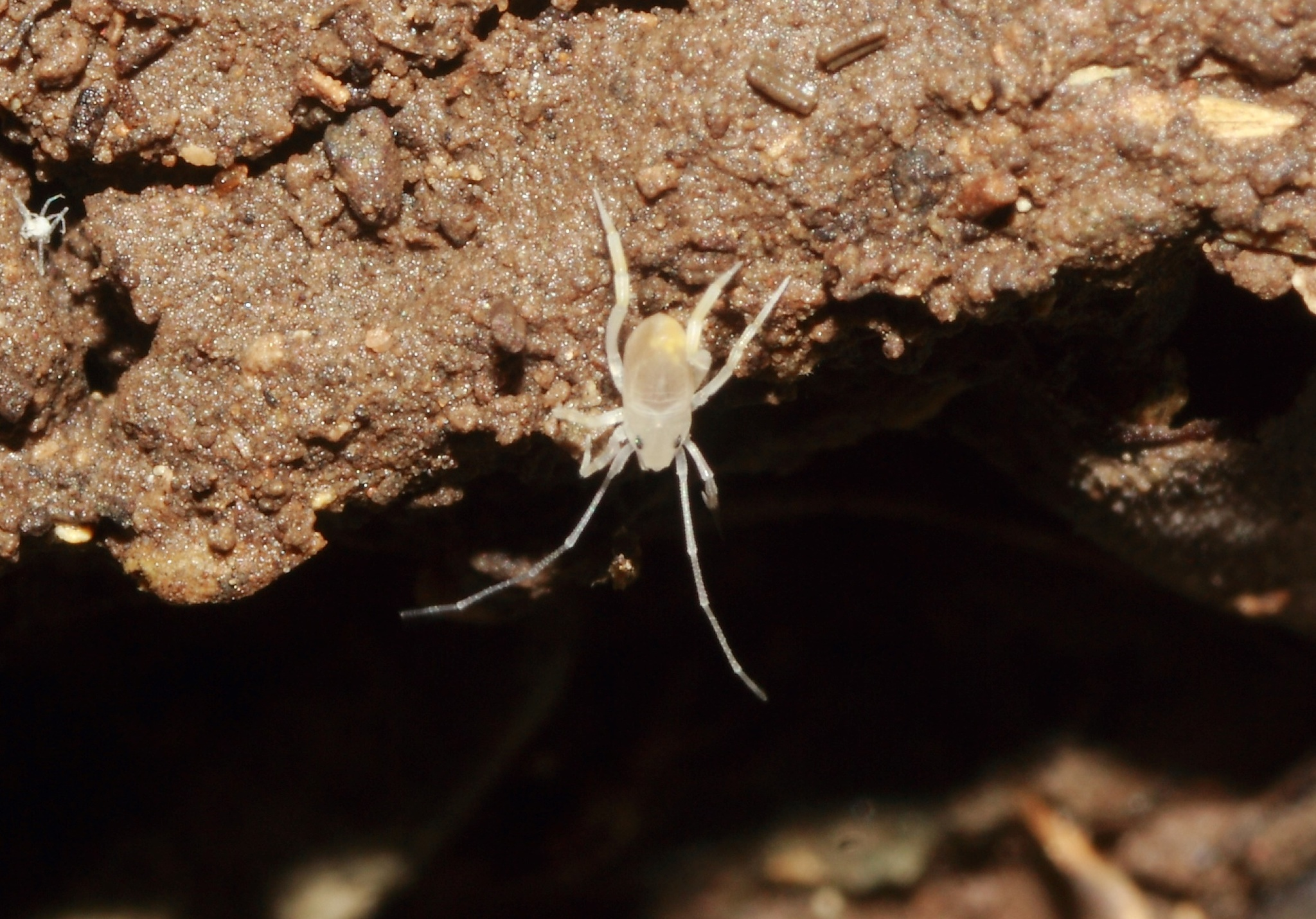
- Opilioacarus texanus

Scientific classification
- Domain: Eukaryota
- Kingdom: Animalia
- Phylum: Arthropoda
- Subphylum: Chelicerata
- Class: Arachnida
- Order: Opilioacarida
- Family: Opilioacaridae
- Genus: Opilioacarus
- Species: O. texanus

Binomial name
- Opilioacarus texanus (Chamberlin & Mulaik, 1942)

= Opilioacarus texanus =

Species of mite

Opilioacarus texanus is a species of mite in the family Opilioacaridae.
