= Veigaia nemorensis =

Scientific classification
- Domain: Eukaryota
- Kingdom: Animalia
- Phylum: Arthropoda
- Subphylum: Chelicerata
- Class: Arachnida
- Order: Mesostigmata
- Family: Veigaiidae
- Genus: Veigaia
- Species: V. nemorensis

Binomial name
- Veigaia nemorensis (C.L.Koch, 1839)

Species of arachnid

Veigaia nemorensis is a species of mite in the family Veigaiidae. It is found in Europe.
