= Beierolpium squalidum =

Scientific classification
- Kingdom: Animalia
- Phylum: Arthropoda
- Subphylum: Chelicerata
- Class: Arachnida
- Order: Pseudoscorpiones
- Family: Olpiidae
- Genus: Beierolpium
- Species: B. squalidum

Binomial name
- Beierolpium squalidum (Beier, 1966)

Synonyms
- Xenolpium squalidum Beier, 1966

Species of pseudoscorpion

Beierolpium squalidum is a species of pseudoscorpion in the Olpiidae family. It is endemic to Australia. It was described in 1966 by Austrian arachnologist Max Beier.

== Distribution and habitat ==
The species occurs in North West Australia. The type locality is the Kimberley Research Station at Kununurra. The pseudoscorpions are found in plant litter.

== Behaviour ==
The pseudoscorpions are terrestrial predators.
