= Urodinychus =

Scientific classification
- Kingdom: Animalia
- Phylum: Arthropoda
- Subphylum: Chelicerata
- Class: Arachnida
- Order: Mesostigmata
- Family: Urodinychidae
- Genus: Urodinychus; Berlese, 1903

Genus of mites

Urodinychus (from Ancient Greek οὐρά (ourá), meaning "tail", δι- (di-), meaning "two", and ὄνυξ (ónux), meaning "claw") is a genus of mites in the family Urodinychidae.

== Species ==
- Urodinychus carinata (Berlese, 1888)
