= Cyrthydrolaelaps =

Scientific classification
- Domain: Eukaryota
- Kingdom: Animalia
- Phylum: Arthropoda
- Subphylum: Chelicerata
- Class: Arachnida
- Order: Mesostigmata
- Family: Veigaiidae
- Genus: Cyrthydrolaelaps; Berlese, 1904

Genus of mites

Cyrthydrolaelaps is a genus of mites in the family Veigaiidae.

== Species ==
- Cyrthydrolaelaps hirtus Berlese, 1904
