= Austrohorus =

Scientific classification
- Kingdom: Animalia
- Phylum: Arthropoda
- Subphylum: Chelicerata
- Class: Arachnida
- Order: Pseudoscorpiones
- Family: Olpiidae
- Genus: Austrohorus; Beier, 1966

Type species
- Austrohorus exsul Beier, 1966

Genus of pseudoscorpions

Austrohorus is a monotypic genus of pseudoscorpions in the Olpiidae family. It is endemic to Australia. It was described in 1966 by Austrian arachnologist Max Beier.

== Species ==
The genus contains the single species Austrohorus exsul Beier, 1966.

=== Distribution and habitat ===
The species occurs in the Mid West region of Western Australia. It is known only from the type locality of Morawa, about 370 km north of Perth. The holotype male was found under a log by a salt lake.

=== Behaviour ===
The pseudoscorpions are terrestrial predators.
