= Vinicoloraobovella =

Scientific classification
- Kingdom: Animalia
- Phylum: Arthropoda
- Subphylum: Chelicerata
- Class: Arachnida
- Order: Mesostigmata
- Family: Urodinychidae
- Genus: Vinicoloraobovella; Hirschmann, 1979

Genus of mites

Vinicoloraobovella is a genus of mites in the family Urodinychidae.

== Species ==
- Vinicoloraobovella rubra (Athias-Binche, 1983)
