= Gorirossia =

Scientific classification
- Domain: Eukaryota
- Kingdom: Animalia
- Phylum: Arthropoda
- Subphylum: Chelicerata
- Class: Arachnida
- Order: Mesostigmata
- Family: Veigaiidae
- Genus: Gorirossia; Farrier, 1957

Genus of mites

Gorirossia is a genus of mites in the family Veigaiidae.

== Species ==
- Gorirossia whartoni Farrier, 1957
