= Veigaia =

Scientific classification
- Kingdom: Animalia
- Phylum: Arthropoda
- Subphylum: Chelicerata
- Class: Arachnida
- Order: Mesostigmata
- Family: Veigaiidae
- Genus: Veigaia; Oudemans, 1905

Genus of mites

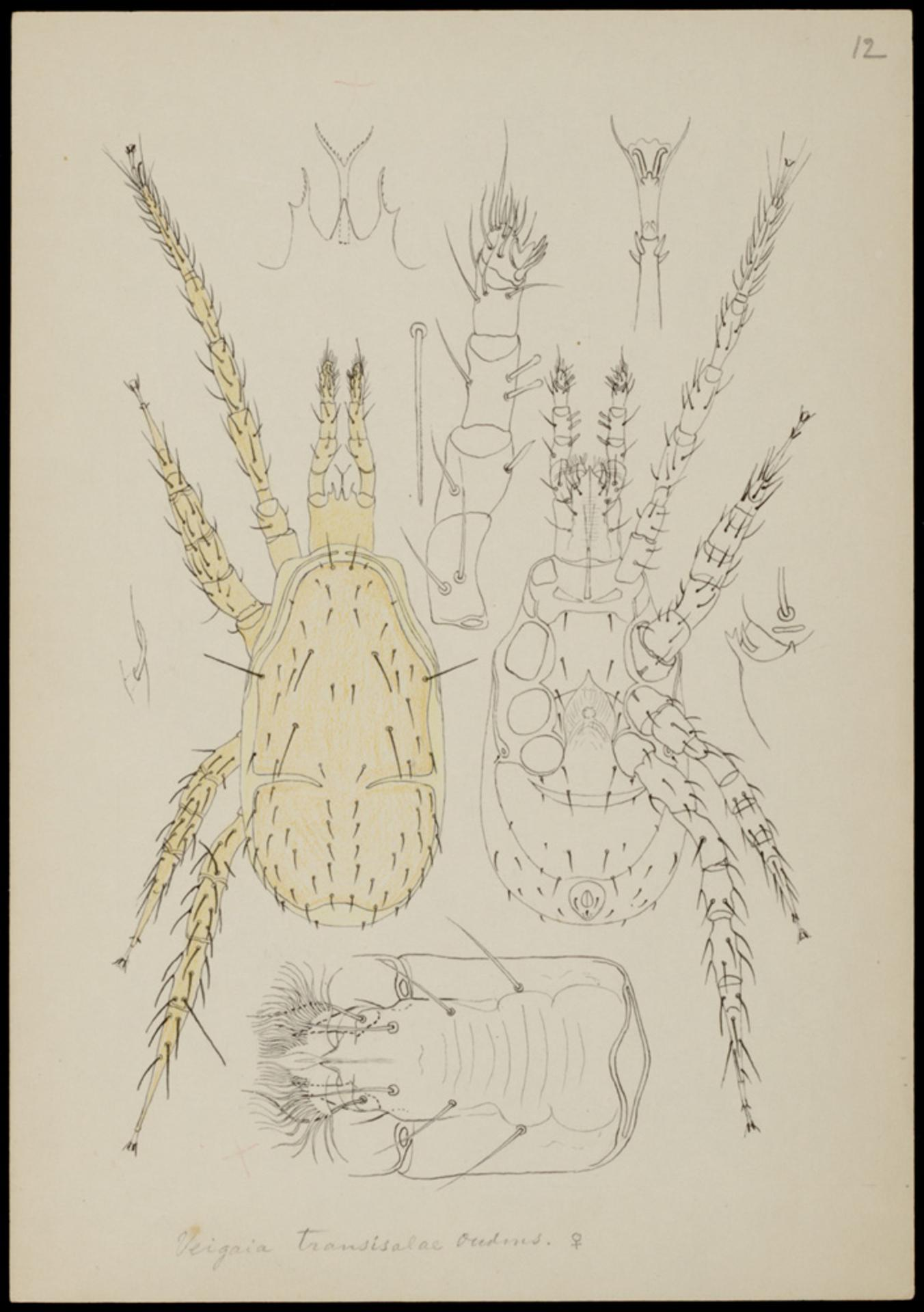
Illustration of Veigaia transisalae

Veigaia is a genus of mites in the family Veigaiidae.

== Species ==
- Veigaia agilis (Berlese, 1916)
- Veigaia anmashanensis Tseng, 1994
- Veigaia ashizuriensis Ishikawa, 1978
- Veigaia belovae Davydova, 1979
- Veigaia benoiti Loots, 1980
- Veigaia bogdanovi Davydova, 1978
- Veigaia bregetovae Petrova & Makarova, 1989
- Veigaia capreolus (Berlese, 1905)
- Veigaia carpillaris Tseng, 1994
- Veigaia cerva (Kramer, 1876)
- Veigaia clavata Ma-Liming & Wang-Shenron, 1998
- Veigaia cuneata Ma, 1996
- Veigaia exigua (Berlese, 1916)
- Veigaia formosana Tseng, 1994
- Veigaia gentiles Womersley, 1956
- Veigaia hohuanshanensis Tseng, 1994
- Veigaia incisa Hurlbutt, 1984
- Veigaia inexpectata Kaluz, 1993
- Veigaia kawasawai Ishikawa, 1982
- Veigaia kochi (Trägårdh, 1901)
- Veigaia lauseggeri Schmolzer, 1992
- Veigaia letovae Davydova, 1979
- Veigaia limulus Tseng, 1994
- Veigaia mitis (Berlese, 1916)
- Veigaia nemorensis (C.L.Koch, 1836)
- Veigaia nodosoides Hurlbutt, 1984
- Veigaia paradoxa Willmann, 1951
- Veigaia philippiensis Hurlbutt, 1984
- Veigaia planicola (Berlese, 1892)
- Veigaia preendopodalia Hurlbutt, 1984
- Veigaia propinqua Willmann, 1936
- Veigaia pseudouncata Tseng, 1994
- Veigaia relicta Schmolzer, 1995
- Veigaia sinicus Ma & Piao, 1981
- Veigaia sylvatica Hurlbutt, 1984
- Veigaia tangwanghensis Ma & Yin, 1999
- Veigaia uncata Farrier, 1957
- Veigaia wyandottensis (Packard, 1888)
