= Linnaeolpium =

Scientific classification
- Kingdom: Animalia
- Phylum: Arthropoda
- Subphylum: Chelicerata
- Class: Arachnida
- Order: Pseudoscorpiones
- Family: Olpiidae
- Genus: Linnaeolpium; Harvey & Leng, 2008

Type species
- Linnaeolpium linnaei Harvey & Leng, 2008

Genus of pseudoscorpions

Linnaeolpium is a monotypic genus of pseudoscorpions in the Olpiidae family. It was described in 2008 by Australian arachnologists Mark Harvey and Mei Chen Leng. The genus name Linnaeolpium honours Carl Linnaeus (1707–1778), founder of modern taxonomy, in combination with the generic name Olpium.

== Species ==
The genus contains the single species Linnaeolpium linnaei Harvey & Leng, 2008. The specific epithet linnaei echos the genus name in honouring Carl Linnaeus.

=== Description ===
The body length of the holotype male is 1.32 mm. Colouration is very pale, with the pedipalps and front of the carapace slightly darker. The eyes are much reduced.

=== Distribution and habitat ===
This short-range endemic species occurs in the Pilbara region of North West Australia. It is known only from the type locality of the pisolitic Mesa K, near the iron-ore mining town of Pannawonica, about 1,400 km north of Perth. The holotype was found in a litter trap.

=== Behaviour ===
The pseudoscorpions are terrestrial predators.
