= Xenolpium =

Scientific classification
- Kingdom: Animalia
- Phylum: Arthropoda
- Subphylum: Chelicerata
- Class: Arachnida
- Order: Pseudoscorpiones
- Family: Olpiidae
- Genus: Xenolpium; Chamberlin, 1930

Type species
- Olpium pacificum With, 1907

Synonyms
- Antiolpium Beier, 1962

Genus of pseudoscorpions

Xenolpium is a genus of pseudoscorpions in the Olpiidae family, with species found on various Indian Ocean islands and in Australasia. It was described in 1930 by American arachnologist Joseph Conrad Chamberlin.

== Species ==
The genus contains the following species:

- Xenolpium insulare Beier, 1940
- Xenolpium longiventer (L. Koch and Keyserling, 1886)
- Xenolpium madagascariense (Beier, 1931)
- Xenolpium pacificum (With, 1907)
  - Xenolpium pacificum pacificum (With, 1907)
  - Xenolpium pacificum norfolkense Beier, 1976
