= Horus (arachnid) =

Scientific classification
- Kingdom: Animalia
- Phylum: Arthropoda
- Subphylum: Chelicerata
- Class: Arachnida
- Order: Pseudoscorpiones
- Family: Olpiidae
- Genus: Horus; J. C. Chamberlin, 1930

Genus of pseudoscorpions

Horus is a genus of pseudoscorpions in the family Olpiidae. There are about 10 described species in Horus, found in Africa.

== Species ==
These species belong to the genus Horus:

- Horus asper Beier, 1947
- Horus brevipes Beier, 1964
- Horus difficilis Vachon, 1941
- Horus gracilis Beier, 1958
- Horus granulatus (Ellingsen, 1912)
- Horus modestus Chamberlin, 1930
- Horus montanus Beier, 1955
- Horus obscurus (Tullgren, 1907)
- Horus transvaalensis Beier, 1964
- Horus zonatus Beier, 1964
