= Euryolpium =

Scientific classification
- Kingdom: Animalia
- Phylum: Arthropoda
- Subphylum: Chelicerata
- Class: Arachnida
- Order: Pseudoscorpiones
- Family: Olpiidae
- Genus: Euryolpium; Redikorzev, 1938

Type species
- Euryolpium agniae Redikorzev, 1938

Genus of pseudoscorpions

Euryolpium is a genus of pseudoscorpions in the Olpiidae family. It was described in 1938 by Russian zoologist Vladimir Redikorzev.

== Species ==
The genus contains the following species:

- Euryolpium agniae Redikorzev, 1938
- Euryolpium amboinense (Chamberlin, 1930)
- Euryolpium aureum Murthy & Ananthakrishnan, 1977
- Euryolpium granulatum Murthy & Ananthakrishnan, 1977
- Euryolpium granulosum (Hoff, 1947)
- Euryolpium indicum Murthy & Ananthakrishnan, 1977
- Euryolpium intermedium Murthy & Ananthakrishnan, 1977
- Euryolpium michaelseni (Tullgren, 1909)
- Euryolpium oceanicum Murthy & Ananthakrishnan, 1977
- Euryolpium robustum Murthy & Ananthakrishnan, 1977
- Euryolpium salomonis (Beier, 1935)
- Euryolpium striatum Murthy & Ananthakrishnan, 1977
