= Gamasolaelaps =

Scientific classification
- Domain: Eukaryota
- Kingdom: Animalia
- Phylum: Arthropoda
- Subphylum: Chelicerata
- Class: Arachnida
- Order: Mesostigmata
- Family: Veigaiidae
- Genus: Gamasolaelaps; Berlese, 1904

Diversity
- c. 20 species

Genus of mites

Gamasolaelaps is a genus of mites belonging to the family Veigaiidae. Males of this genus can be distinguished from other members of the family by the lack of spurs on the second pair of legs and the fact the sclerotized shields on the underside of the body are never fused together. Females are more difficult to diagnose, a high powered microscope being required.

== Species ==
- Gamasolaelaps aurantiacus (Berlese, 1903)
- Gamasolaelaps bellingeri Evans
- Gamasolaelaps bidentis Tseng, 1994
- Gamasolaelaps bondwaensis Hurlbutt, 1983
- Gamasolaelaps cerviformis Berlese
- Gamasolaelaps cornuum Karg, 1997
- Gamasolaelaps ctenisetiger Ishikawa, 1978
- Gamasolaelaps cuniculicola Wang, Zhou & Ji, 1990
- Gamasolaelaps dorotheae Koyumdjieva, 1986
- Gamasolaelaps excisus (Koch)
- Gamasolaelaps leptocornutus Karg, 1998
- Gamasolaelaps multidentatus Karg
- Gamasolaelaps pamirensis Barilo, 1987
- Gamasolaelaps praetarsalis Karg, 1997
- Gamasolaelaps pygmaeus Bregetova
- Gamasolaelaps tuberculatus Breg.
- Gamasolaelaps whartoni (Farrier)
