= Calocheiridius =

Scientific classification
- Domain: Eukaryota
- Kingdom: Animalia
- Phylum: Arthropoda
- Subphylum: Chelicerata
- Class: Arachnida
- Order: Pseudoscorpiones
- Family: Olpiidae
- Genus: Calocheiridius; Beier & Turk, 1952

Genus of pseudoscorpions

Calocheiridius is a genus of pseudoscorpions in the family Olpiidae, containing the following species:

- Calocheiridius africanus Beier, 1955
- Calocheiridius amrithiensis Sivaraman, 1980
- Calocheiridius antushi Krumpál, 1983
- Calocheiridius badonneli Heurtault, 1983
- Calocheiridius beieri (Murthy, 1960)
- Calocheiridius braccatus Beier, 1959
- Calocheiridius centralis (Beier, 1952)
- Calocheiridius congicus (Beier, 1954)
- Calocheiridius crassifemoratus Beier, 1955
- Calocheiridius elegans Murthy & Ananthakrishnan, 1977
- Calocheiridius gabbutti Murthy & Ananthakrishnan, 1977
- Calocheiridius gracilipalpus Mahnert, 1982
- Calocheiridius granulatus Sivaraman, 1980
- Calocheiridius hygricus Murthy & Ananthakrishnan, 1977
- Calocheiridius indicus Beier, 1967
- Calocheiridius intermedius Sivaraman, 1980
- Calocheiridius iranicus Nassirkhani, 2014
- Calocheiridius libanoticus Beier, 1955
- Calocheiridius loebli Beier, 1974
- Calocheiridius mavromoustakisi Beier & Turk, 1952
- Calocheiridius murthii Sivaraman, 1980
- Calocheiridius mussardi Beier, 1973
- Calocheiridius nepalensis Beier, 1974
- Calocheiridius olivieri (Simon, 1879)
- Calocheiridius orientalis Murthy & Ananthakrishnan, 1977
- Calocheiridius rhodesiacus Beier, 1964
- Calocheiridius somalicus (Caporiacco, 1941)
- Calocheiridius sulcatus Beier, 1974
- Calocheiridius termitophilus Beier, 1964
- Calocheiridius viridis Murthy & Ananthakrishnan, 1977
