= Beierolpium =

Scientific classification
- Kingdom: Animalia
- Phylum: Arthropoda
- Subphylum: Chelicerata
- Class: Arachnida
- Order: Pseudoscorpiones
- Family: Olpiidae
- Genus: Beierolpium; Heurtault, 1976

Type species
- Garypinus oceanicum With, 1907

Genus of pseudoscorpions

Beierolpium is a genus of pseudoscorpions in the Olpiidae family. It was described in 1976 by French arachnologist Jacqueline Heurtault.

== Species ==
The genus contains the following species:

- Beierolpium benoiti Mahnert, 1978
- Beierolpium bornemisszai (Beier, 1966)
- Beierolpium clarum (Beier, 1952)
- Beierolpium cyclopium (Beier, 1965)
- Beierolpium deserticola (Beier, 1964)
- Beierolpium flavum Mahnert, 1984
- Beierolpium graniferum (Beier, 1965)
- Beierolpium holmi Mahnert, 1982
- Beierolpium incrassatum (Beier, 1964)
- Beierolpium kerioense Mahnert, 1982
- Beierolpium lawrencei (Beier, 1964)
- Beierolpium novaguineense (Beier, 1935)
- Beierolpium oceanicum (With, 1907)
- Beierolpium rossi (Beier, 1967)
- Beierolpium soudanense (Vachon, 1940)
  - Beierolpium soudanense franzi (Beier, 1965)
  - Beierolpium soudanense soudanense (Vachon, 1940)
- Beierolpium squalidum (Beier, 1966)
- Beierolpium tanense Mahnert, 1982
- Beierolpium vanharteni Mahnert, 2007
- Beierolpium venezuelense Heurtault, 1982
