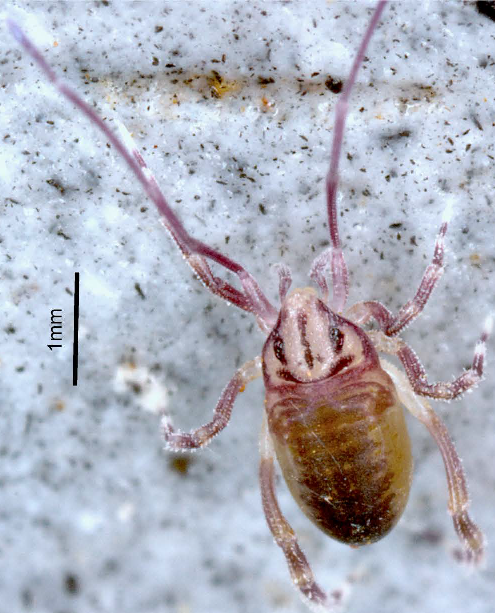
- Photo of Opilioacarus baeticus

Scientific classification
- Kingdom: Animalia
- Phylum: Arthropoda
- Subphylum: Chelicerata
- Class: Arachnida
- Order: Opilioacarida
- Family: Opilioacaridae
- Genus: Opilioacarus; With, 1902

Type species
- Opilioacarus segmentatus With, 1902

= Opilioacarus =

Opilioacarus Temporal range: Eocene–Recent

Genus of mites

Opilioacarus is a genus of opilioacarid mites native to the Mediterranean region. The following species are recognised:

- Opilioacarus baeticus Moraza et al. 2022, Iberian Peninsula
- Opilioacarus brignolii Araújo & di Palma, 2018, Southern Italy, Sardinia
- Opilioacarus italicus (With, 1904) Sicily
- Opilioacarus segmentatus With, 1902 Greece, Algeria, Uzbekistan? (possibly in need of splitting)
- Opilioacarus thaleri
- †Opilioacarus aenigmus Dunlop et al. 2004 Baltic amber, Eocene
- †?Opilioacarus groehni Dunlop & Bernardi, 2014 Burmese amber, Myanmar, Late Cretaceous (Cenomanian) (tentatively placed in this genus)

The following species have been transferred elsewhere:

- Opilioacarus bajacalifornicus Vázquez & Klompen, 2002
- Opilioacarus nicaraguensis Vázquez & Klompen, 2002
- Opilioacarus nohbecanus Vázquez & Klompen, 2002
- Opilioacarus ojastii (Lehtinen, 1980)
- Opilioacarus orghidani Juvara-Bals & Baltac, 1977
- Opilioacarus platensis Silvestri, 1905
- Opilioacarus siankaanensis Vázquez & Klompen, 2002
- Opilioacarus texanus (Chamberlin & Mulaik, 1942)
- Opilioacarus vanderhammeni Juvara-Bals & Baltac, 1977
