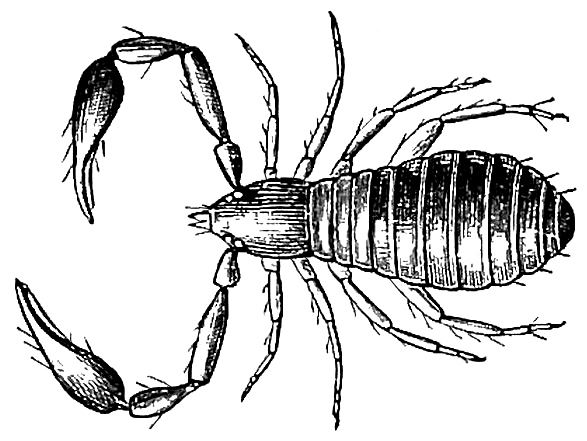
- Olpium pallipes

Scientific classification
- Kingdom: Animalia
- Phylum: Arthropoda
- Subphylum: Chelicerata
- Class: Arachnida
- Order: Pseudoscorpiones
- Family: Olpiidae
- Genus: Olpium; L.Koch, 1873

Type species
- Obisium pallipes Lucas, 1849

= Olpium =

Genus of pseudoscorpions

Olpium is a genus of pseudoscorpions in the Olpiidae family. It was described in 1873 by German arachnologist Ludwig Carl Christian Koch.

== Species ==
The genus contains the following species:

- Olpium afghanicum Beier, 1952
- Olpium angolense Beier, 1931
- Olpium arabicum Simon, 1890
- Olpium asiaticum Murthy & Ananthakrishnan, 1977
- Olpium australicum Beier, 1969
- Olpium canariense Beier, 1965
- Olpium ceylonicum Beier, 1973
- Olpium crypticum Murthy & Ananthakrishnan, 1977
- Olpium digitum Murthy & Ananthakrishnan, 1977
- Olpium flavum Mahnert, 2007
- Olpium fuscimanum Beier, 1957
- Olpium gladiatum Murthy & Ananthakrishnan, 1977
- Olpium graminum Murthy & Ananthakrishnan, 1977
- Olpium granulatum Murthy & Ananthakrishnan, 1977
- Olpium halophilum Mahnert, 1982
- Olpium indicum Beier, 1967
- Olpium intermedium Beier, 1959
- Olpium jacobsoni Tullgren, 1908
- Olpium kochi Simon, 1881
- Olpium kuriense Mahnert, 2007
- Olpium lindbergi Beier, 1959
- Olpium microstethum Pavesi, 1880
- Olpium milneri Mahnert, 2007
- Olpium minnizioides Vachon, 1966
- Olpium omanense Mahnert, 1991
- Olpium pallipes (Lucas, 1849)
  - Olpium pallipes balcanicum Beier, 1931
  - Olpium pallipes pallipes (Lucas, 1849)
- Olpium philippinum Beier, 1967
- Olpium pusillulum Beier, 1959
- Olpium robustum Murthy & Ananthakrishnan, 1977
- Olpium socotraense Mahnert, 2007
- Olpium tenue Chamberlin, 1930
- Olpium tropicum Murthy & Ananthakrishnan, 1977
- Olpium vanharteni Mahnert, 2007

NB: Olpium savignyi Simon, 1879 is considered a nomen nudum.
