= Urodinychidae =

Urodinychidae Temporal range: Palaeogene–present

Scientific classification
- Kingdom: Animalia
- Phylum: Arthropoda
- Subphylum: Chelicerata
- Class: Arachnida
- Order: Mesostigmata
- Family: Urodinychidae; Berlese, 1917

Family of mites

Urodinychidae (from Ancient Greek οὐρά (ourá), meaning "tail", δι- (di-), meaning "two", and ὄνυξ (ónux), meaning "claw") is a family of mites in the order Mesostigmata.

== Genera ==
The family Urodinychidae contains the following genera:

- Mengzongella Kontschán, Wang & Neményi, 2021
- Urodinychus Berlese, 1903
- Uroobovella Berlese, 1903
- Vinicoloraobovella Hirschmann, 1979
