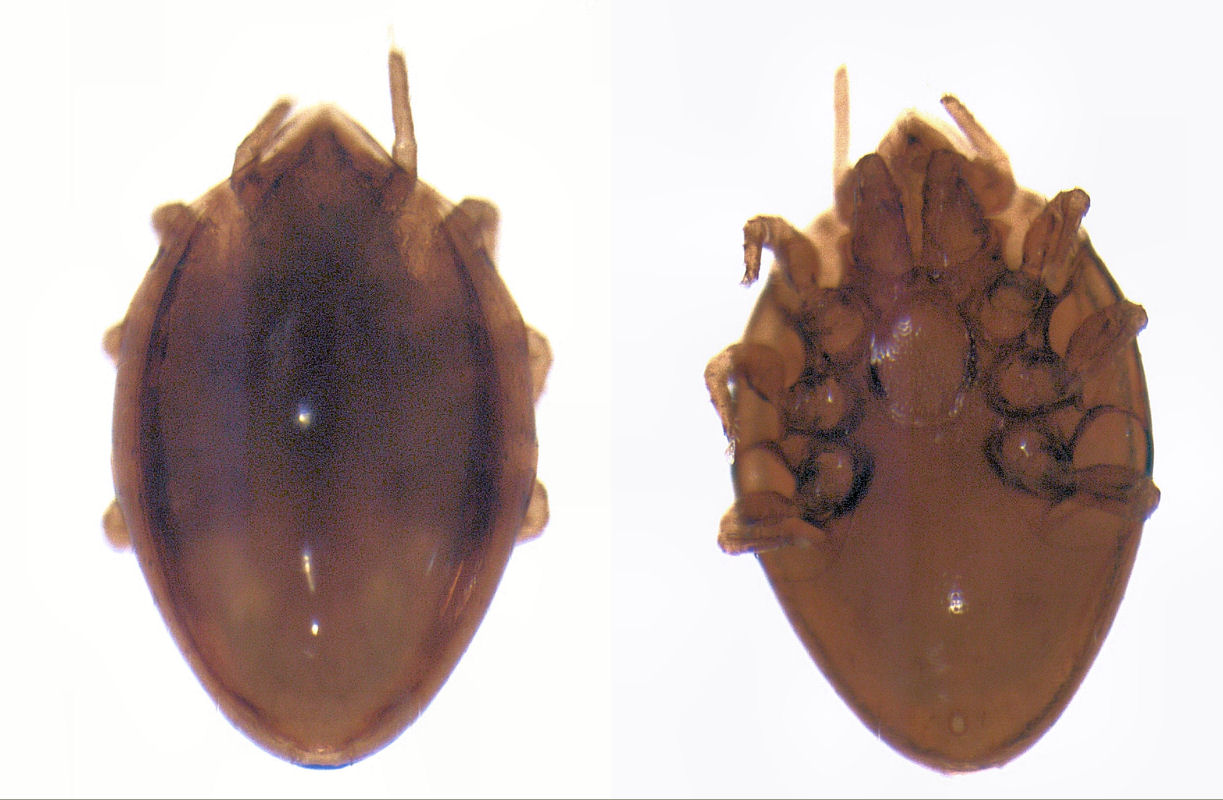
- Uroobovella pilosetosa

Scientific classification
- Kingdom: Animalia
- Phylum: Arthropoda
- Subphylum: Chelicerata
- Class: Arachnida
- Order: Mesostigmata
- Family: Urodinychidae
- Genus: Uroobovella; Berlese, 1903

= Uroobovella =

Genus of mites

Uroobovella is a large genus of mites in the family Urodinychidae.

== Species ==
- Uroobovella advena (Trägårdh, 1912)
- Uroobovella aemulans (Berlese, 1905)
- Uroobovella africana (Oudemans, 1905)
- Uroobovella alascana Wisniewski & Hirschmann, in Wisniewski, Hiramatsu & Hirschmann 1992
- Uroobovella alpina (Schweizer, 1922)
- Uroobovella ambigua Hirschmann, 1979
- Uroobovella andrassyi Hirschmann & Zirngiebl-Nicol, 1972
- Uroobovella anwenjui Ma, 2003
- Uroobovella aokii Hiramatsu, 1979
- Uroobovella appendiculata (Berlese, 1910)
- Uroobovella araucariae Hirschmann, 1972
- Uroobovella assamomarginata Hiramatsu & Hirschmann, 1979
- Uroobovella attaae Hirschmann, 1972
- Uroobovella australiensis Wisniewski & Hirschmann, in Wisniewski, Hiramatsu & Hirschmann 1992
- Uroobovella australiobovata Zirngiebl-Nicol & Hirschmann, 1975
- Uroobovella australiovalis Zirngiebl-Nicol & Hirschmann, 1975
- Uroobovella badia Hirschmann, 1989
- Uroobovella baloghi Hirschmann & Zirngiebl-Nicol, 1962
- Uroobovella belunensis Lombardini, 1962
- Uroobovella berenicea (Berlese, 1910)
- Uroobovella biezankoi Wisniewski & Hirschmann, 1992
- Uroobovella bistellaris (Vitzthum, 1935)
- Uroobovella borealis (Sellnick, 1940)
- Uroobovella bosi (Oudemans, 1903)
- Uroobovella brasiliensis Hirschmann & Zirngiebl-Nicol, 1969
- Uroobovella browningi Ryke, 1958
- Uroobovella bruckii (Berlese, 1916)
- Uroobovella bucovinensis Hutu, 1976
- Uroobovella californiana Wisniewski & Hirschmann, 1992
- Uroobovella carniolensis (Willmann, 1941)
- Uroobovella cassida Fox, 1948
- Uroobovella catharciphorae (Chinniah & Mohanasundaram, 1999)
- Uroobovella cavernosa Hiramatsu, 1979
- Uroobovella cayamasiana Wisniewski & Hirschmann, in Wisniewski, Hiramatsu & Hirschmann 1992
- Uroobovella ceylonensis Zirngiebl-Nicol & Hirschmann, 1975
- Uroobovella ceylonivarians Zirngiebl-Nicol & Hirschmann, 1975
- Uroobovella changbaiensis (Ma, 1985)
- Uroobovella cienfuegi Wisnewski & Hirschmann, 1992
- Uroobovella cooremani Hirschmann, 1979
- Uroobovella coprophila (Womersley, 1960)
- Uroobovella coriacea (Athias-Binche, 1980)
- Uroobovella coronata (Berlese, 1916)
- Uroobovella costaisimilis Wisniewski, 1980
- Uroobovella costal Hirschmann & Zirngiebl-Nicol, 1972
- Uroobovella crassescens Hirschmann, 1981
- Uroobovella crenelata Hirschmann & Zirngiebl-Nicol, 1962
- Uroobovella cribraria (Ewing, 1909)
- Uroobovella cristobalensis Hirschmann, 1979
- Uroobovella crustosa (Vitzthum, 1926)
- Uroobovella cubana Wisnewski & Hirschmann, 1992
- Uroobovella cylindrica (Berlese, 1913)
- Uroobovella cylliboides (Hull, 1923)
- Uroobovella daelei Hirschmann, 1981
- Uroobovella dampfi (Oudemans, 1913)
- Uroobovella delumbis Hirschmann & Hiramatsu, 1990
- Uroobovella denticulata Hirschmann & Zirngiebl-Nicol, 1972
- Uroobovella difoveolata Hirschmann & Zirngiebl-Nicol, 1962
- Uroobovella dryocoetis (Vitzthum, 1923)
- Uroobovella endicellae Wisniewski, 1980
- Uroobovella enodis Hiramatsu, 1985
- Uroobovella erlangensis Hirschmann & Zirngiebl-Nicol, 1962
- Uroobovella euris (Türk & Türk, 1952)
- Uroobovella europaea Hirschmann & Zirngiebl-Nicol, 1962
- Uroobovella expressa Hiramatsu & Hirschmann, 1983
- Uroobovella faceta Hiramatsu & Hirschmann, 1978
- Uroobovella facetaoides Hiramatsu & Hirschmann, 1978
- Uroobovella feideri Hutu, 1976
- Uroobovella fibulata Hirschmann & Zirngiebl-Nicol, 1972
- Uroobovella fimicola (Berlese, 1903)
- Uroobovella fimicolasimilis Hirschmann & Zirngiebl-Nicol, 1972
- Uroobovella fistulata Hiramatsu, 1982
- Uroobovella flagelliger (Berlese, 1910)
- Uroobovella flagelligerformis Hirschmann, 1979
- Uroobovella flammea Hirschmann & Zirngiebl-Nicol, 1972
- Uroobovella folsomi (Ewing, 1909)
- Uroobovella foraminifera (Berlese, 1903)
- Uroobovella foraminosa Hiramatsu, 1979
- Uroobovella formosana Phillipsen & Coppel, 1978
- Uroobovella fortis Hiramatsu & Hirschmann, 1983
- Uroobovella foveolata Hirschmann & Zirngiebl-Nicol, 1972
- Uroobovella foveolatasimilis Hiramatsu, 1980
- Uroobovella fracta (Berlese, 1916)
- Uroobovella franzi Hirschmann & Zirngiebl-Nicol, 1962
- Uroobovella fungivora Hirschmann & Zirngiebl-Nicol, 1962
- Uroobovella furcigera (Vitzthum, 1935)
- Uroobovella ghanae Wisniewski, 1981
- Uroobovella gressitti Hirschmann & Zirngiebl-Nicol, 1972
- Uroobovella guaraniana Wisniewski & Hirschmann, 1992
- Uroobovella hamata Hirschmann, 1979
- Uroobovella haradai Hiramatsu, 1979
- Uroobovella hiramatsuiflagelliger Hirschmann, 1989
- Uroobovella hirschmanni Wisniewski, 1979
- Uroobovella hortensia Karg, 1989
- Uroobovella hummelincki (Sellnick, 1963)
- Uroobovella hungarica Hirschmann & Zirngiebl-Nicol, 1962
- Uroobovella hutuae Wisniewski, 1980
- Uroobovella ikezakii Hiramatsu & Hirschmann, 1978
- Uroobovella imadatei Hiramatsu, 1980
- Uroobovella incerta Hiramatsu & Hirschmann, 1978
- Uroobovella incertaoides Hiramatsu & Hirschmann, 1978
- Uroobovella inhaerens (Vitzthum, 1921)
- Uroobovella insignis Hirschmann & Zirngiebl-Nicol, 1962
- Uroobovella ipidis (Vitzthum, 1923)
- Uroobovella ipidisimilis Hirschmann & Zirngiebl-Nicol, 1962
- Uroobovella isabellae Wisniewski, 1981
- Uroobovella ishigakiensis Hiramatsu, 1979
- Uroobovella ishikawai Hiramatsu, 1979
- Uroobovella itoi Hiramatsu & Hirschmann, 1977
- Uroobovella japanocrenelata Hiramatsu & Hirschmann, 1978
- Uroobovella japanomarginata Hiramatsu, 1979
- Uroobovella japanovarians Hiramatsu & Hirschmann, 1978
- Uroobovella japonica Hiramatsu & Hirschmann, 1977
- Uroobovella javae Wisniewski, 1981
- Uroobovella jerzyi Buhlmann, 1980
- Uroobovella johnstoni (Indira, Rao, Thakur & Raj, 1980)
- Uroobovella katmanduana Wisniewski & Hirschmann, 1991
- Uroobovella kneissli Hirschmann & Zirngiebl-Nicol, 1962
- Uroobovella kraussei Zirngiebl-Nicol, 1972
- Uroobovella kurosai Hiramatsu, 1979
- Uroobovella laotana Wisniewski & Hirschmann, in Wisniewski, Hiramatsu & Hirschmann 1992
- Uroobovella leleupi (Driel, Loots & Marais, 1977)
- Uroobovella levigata Hirschmann & Hiramatsu, 1990
- Uroobovella levis Pearse, Patterson, Rankin & Wharton, 1936
- Uroobovella ligulaformis Hirschmann, 1979
- Uroobovella limatula Hiramatsu, 1979
- Uroobovella limpida Hiramatsu & Hirschmann, 1983
- Uroobovella litteri (Khan, 1968)
- Uroobovella longiseta (Deb & Raychaudhuri, 1965)
- Uroobovella longitricha Wisniewski & Hirschmann, 1992
- Uroobovella luzonensis Hiramatsu & Hirschmann, in Wisniewski, Hiramatsu & Hirschmann 1992
- Uroobovella lyriformis Hirschmann, 1973
- Uroobovella madagascariensis Wisniewski & Hirschmann, in Wisniewski, Hiramatsu & Hirschmann 1992
- Uroobovella makilingensis Hirschmann & Hiramatsu, 1990
- Uroobovella marginata (C.L. Koch, 1839)
- Uroobovella matskasii Hirschmann, 1981
- Uroobovella mazatlana Hirschmann, 1979
- Uroobovella meridiana Hiramatsu, 1978
- Uroobovella mesoafricana Wisniewski & Hirschmann, in Wisniewski, Hiramatsu & Hirschmann 1992
- Uroobovella mexicana Hirschmann, 1979
- Uroobovella micherdzinskii Hirschmann & Zirngiebl-Nicol, 1972
- Uroobovella michiganensis (Vitzthum, 1926)
- Uroobovella minagawai Hiramatsu, 1981
- Uroobovella minima (Koch, 1841)
- Uroobovella mitakensis Hiramatsu & Hirschmann, 1977
- Uroobovella miyatakei Hiramatsu, 1979
- Uroobovella moseri Hirschmann, 1972
- Uroobovella mrciaki Masan, 1999
- Uroobovella multidentata Hiramatsu, 1983
- Uroobovella nahuelbutaensis Hirschmann, 1973
- Uroobovella nantouensis Hiramatsu & Hirschmann, in Wisniewski, Hiramatsu & Hirschmann 1992
- Uroobovella neoamericana Hirschmann, 1972
- Uroobovella neohirschmanni Hiramatsu, 1978
- Uroobovella neohortensia Wisniewski & Hirschmann, 1991
- Uroobovella neokurosai Hiramatsu, 1980
- Uroobovella neosudanensis Hiramatsu, 1981
- Uroobovella neovarians Hiramatsu, 1981
- Uroobovella nipponica (Kishida, 1949)
- Uroobovella nitida Hiramatsu, 1981
- Uroobovella nitidissima (Berlese, 1916)
- Uroobovella nostras Berlese, 1918
- Uroobovella notabilis Berlese, 1903
- Uroobovella nova (Oudemans, 1902)
- Uroobovella novasimilis Hiramatsu, 1979
- Uroobovella novateutoniae Hirschmann, 1981
- Uroobovella novus (Oudemans, 1902)
- Uroobovella obovata (G. Canestrini & Berlese, 1884)
- Uroobovella ogasawaraensis Hiramatsu, 1979
- Uroobovella okinawaensis Hiramatsu, 1979
- Uroobovella ornata Hirschmann, 1981
- Uroobovella orri Hirschmann, 1972
- Uroobovella orrioides Hirschmann, 1981
- Uroobovella orrisimilis Zirngiebl-Nicol & Hirschmann, 1975
- Uroobovella ortleppi (Ryke, 1958)
- Uroobovella ovalis Hirschmann & Zirngiebl-Nicol, 1962
- Uroobovella papuensis Hiramatsu, 1980
- Uroobovella parva Hiramatsu & Hirschmann, 1977
- Uroobovella passali Wisniewski & Hirschmann, 1993
- Uroobovella pauxilla Hiramatsu & Hirschmann, 1981
- Uroobovella pauxillaoides Hiramatsu & Hirschmann, 1981
- Uroobovella pearsi (Wharton, 1938)
- Uroobovella pectinata (Hirschmann, 1973)
- Uroobovella pectinatasimilis Hiramatsu, 1980
- Uroobovella penicillata (Leitner, 1947)
- Uroobovella pergibba (Berlese, 1905)
- Uroobovella perlucida Hirschmann & Hiramatsu, 1990
- Uroobovella peruana Wisniewski & Hirschmann, 1992
- Uroobovella petiti (Coineau & Trave, 1964)
- Uroobovella plaumanni (Sellnick, 1962)
- Uroobovella porosa Wisniewski & Hirschmann, 1993
- Uroobovella portalis Hirschmann, 1973
- Uroobovella portalisimilis Hirschmann, 1981
- Uroobovella posnaniensis Wisniewski & Hirschmann, in Wisniewski, Hiramatsu & Hirschmann 1992
- Uroobovella postdorsalis Karg, 1989
- Uroobovella pulchella (Berlese, 1904)
- Uroobovella pygorana Wisniewski & Hirschmann, 1992
- Uroobovella pyriformis (Berlese, 1920)
- Uroobovella rackei (Oudemans, 1912)
- Uroobovella rectangula (Berlese, 1913)
- Uroobovella reticulata (Willmann, 1941)
- Uroobovella rotundaobovella Hirschmann, 1981
- Uroobovella rubella (Athias-Binche, 1980)
- Uroobovella ruehmi Hirschmann, 1972
- Uroobovella samoae (Hirst, 1927)
- Uroobovella scelerum (Vitzthum, 1926)
- Uroobovella schulzi (Willmann, 1959)
- Uroobovella sellnickiamericana Hirschmann, 1979
- Uroobovella sellnickicylindrica Hirschmann, 1979
- Uroobovella sellnickivillosella Hirschmann, 1979
- Uroobovella serangensis Hiramatsu, 1980
- Uroobovella setosa Pearse, Patterson, Rankin & Wharton, 1936
- Uroobovella shikokuensis Hiramatsu, 1979
- Uroobovella shiratsuensis Hiramatsu, 1979
- Uroobovella similimitakensis Hiramatsu & Hirschmann, 1981
- Uroobovella similiobovata Hirschmann & Zirngiebl-Nicol, 1962
- Uroobovella similiovalis Hiramatsu & Hirschmann, 1979
- Uroobovella similizairensis Hirschmann, 1981
- Uroobovella slovaca Masan, 1999
- Uroobovella spinosa Pearse, Patterson, Rankin & Wharton, 1936
- Uroobovella spinulipes (Canestrini, 1884)
- Uroobovella stercorea Hiramatsu & Hirschmann, 1978
- Uroobovella stricta Hirschmann & Zirngiebl-Nicol, 1972
- Uroobovella stylifera (Trägårdh, 1952)
- Uroobovella subvitrea Karg, 1989
- Uroobovella sudanensis Hirschmann & Zirngiebl-Nicol, 1972
- Uroobovella sugiyamai Hiramatsu, 1979
- Uroobovella sumatrensis (Vitzthum, 1921)
- Uroobovella takakii Hiramatsu, 1980
- Uroobovella tamena Hirschmann, 1979
- Uroobovella tasmanica (Womersley, 1955)
- Uroobovella teres Hiramatsu, 1980
- Uroobovella texana Wisniewski & Hirschmann, 1992
- Uroobovella tokyoensis Hiramatsu, 1979
- Uroobovella topali Hiramatsu & Hirschmann, 1981
- Uroobovella treati Hirschmann, 1980
- Uroobovella tridens Hirschmann & Zirngiebl-Nicol, 1972
- Uroobovella vallei (Sellnick, 1959)
- Uroobovella varians Hirschmann & Zirngiebl-Nicol, 1962
- Uroobovella variseta Wisniewski & Hirschmann, 1994
- Uroobovella venusta (Berlese, 1916)
- Uroobovella vietnamensis Hirschmann, 1981
- Uroobovella vietnamvarians Hirschmann, 1981
- Uroobovella villosella Berlese, 1913
- Uroobovella vinicolora (Vitzthum, 1926)
- Uroobovella vitzthumi Hirschmann & Zirngiebl-Nicol, 1962
- Uroobovella vulgaris Hirschmann & Zirngiebl-Nicol, 1972
- Uroobovella weigmanni Hiramatsu, 1978
- Uroobovella wichmanni (Vitzthum, 1923)
- Uroobovella yasumanensis Hiramatsu, 1981
- Uroobovella zairensis Hirschmann, 1981
- Uroobovella zicsii Hirschmann & Zirngiebl-Nicol, 1972
