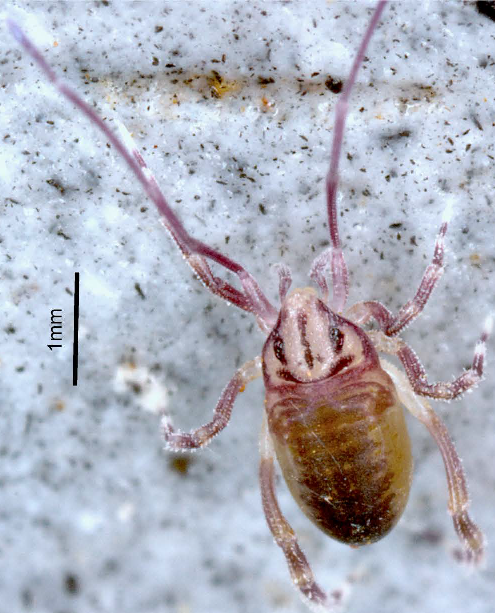

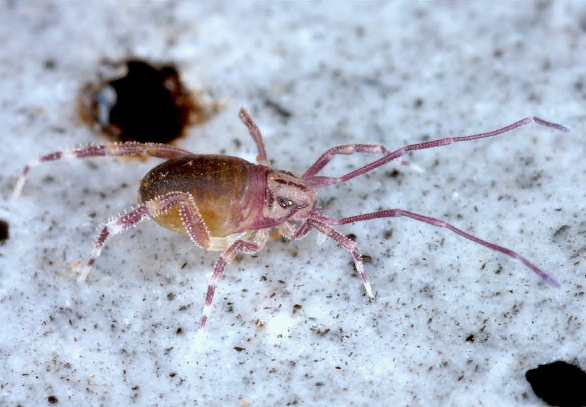
- Specimens of Opilioacarus baeticus

Scientific classification
- Kingdom: Animalia
- Phylum: Arthropoda
- Subphylum: Chelicerata
- Class: Arachnida
- Superorder: Parasitiformes
- Order: Opilioacarida
- Superfamily: Opilioacaroidea; Johnston, 1968
- Family: Opilioacaridae; With, 1902

Synonyms
- Notostigmata; Onychopalpida; Opilioacariformes

= Opilioacaridae =

Opilioacaridae Temporal range: Cenomanian–Recent

Order of mites

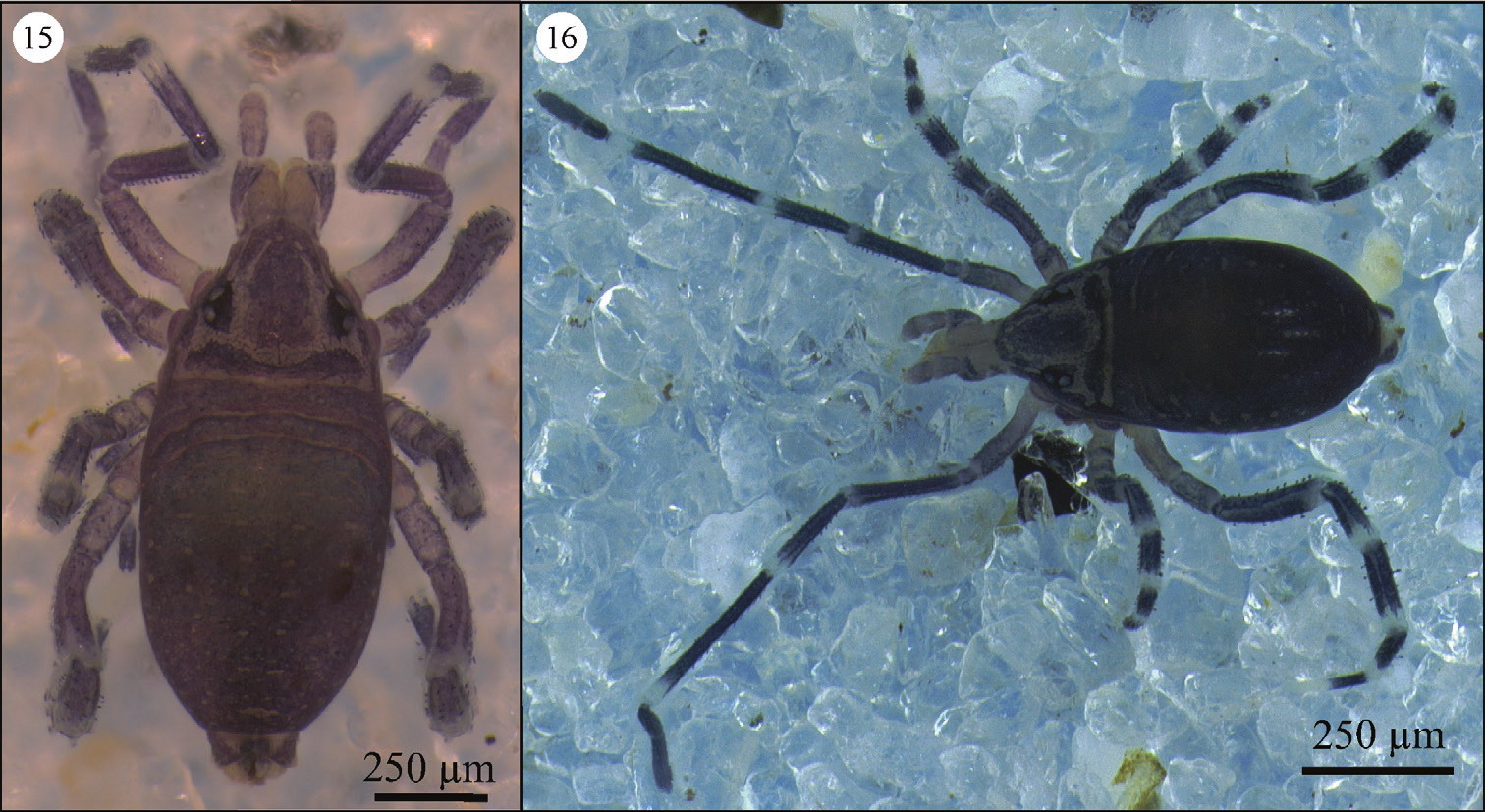
Specimens of Neocarus proteus

Opilioacaridae is the sole family of mites in the order Opilioacarida, made up of about 14 genera. The mites of this family are rare, large (1.5 to 2.5 mm) mites, and are widely considered primitive, as they retain six pairs of eyes, and abdominal segmentation. They have historically been considered separate from other mites belonging to Acariformes and Parasitiformes, but are now generally considered a subgroup of Parasitiformes based on molecular phylogenetics.

The first member of the Opilioacarida to be discovered was the Algerian species Opilioacarus segmentatus, which was described by Carl Johannes With in 1902, followed by the Sicilian Eucarus italicus and Eucarus arabicus from Aden, both in 1904. Two fossil specimens are known, one of which was discovered in Baltic amber from the Eocene, while the other one was discovered in the Burmese amber from the Late Cretaceous (Cenomanian) around 99 million years old, tentatively assigned to the living genus Opilioacarus.

Members of the group live in semi-arid and tropical environments in leaf-litter, under rocks and in caves. Their diet is known to include arthropod carcasses, fungal spores, and pollen.

== Genera ==
These 14 genera belong to the family Opilioacaridae:

- Adenacarus Hammen, 1966
- Amazonacarus Vázquez, Araújo & Feres, 2014
- Brasilacarus Vázquez, Araújo & Feres, 2015
- Caribeacarus Vázquez & Klompen, 2009
- Iberoacarus Moraza & Cuesta-Segura, 2026
- Indiacarus Das & Bastawade, 2007
- Neocarus Chamberlin & Mulaik, 1942
- Opilioacarus With, 1902
- Panchaetes Naudo, 1963
- Paracarus Chamberlin & Mulaik, 1942
- Phalangiacarus Coineau & Hammen, 1979
- Salfacarus Hammen, 1977
- Siamacarus Leclerc, 1989
- Vanderhammenacarus Leclerc, 1989
