= Holothyrus =

Scientific classification
- Kingdom: Animalia
- Phylum: Arthropoda
- Subphylum: Chelicerata
- Class: Arachnida
- Order: Holothyrida
- Family: Holothyridae
- Genus: Holothyrus; Gervais, 1842

Species
- Holothyrus coccinella Gervais, 1842; Holothyrus legendrei Hammen, 1983

Genus of mites

Holothyrus is a genus of mites in the order Holothyrida. It includes two species, Holothyrus coccinella and Holothyrus legendrei.
