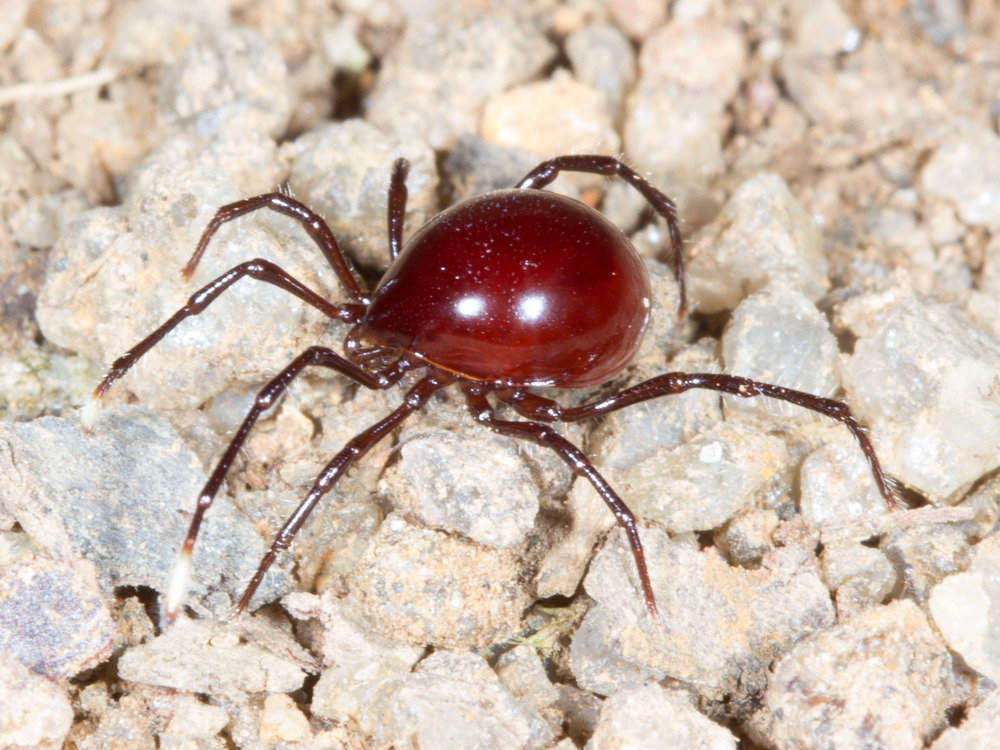
- Sternothyrus braueri, a member of Holothyridae
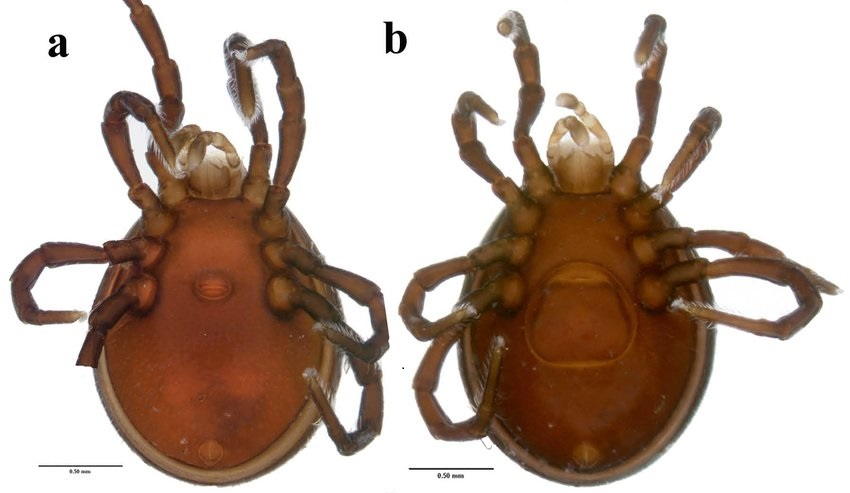
- Underside of male (left) and female (right) of Diplothyrus lecorrei (Neothyridae)

Scientific classification
- Kingdom: Animalia
- Phylum: Arthropoda
- Subphylum: Chelicerata
- Class: Arachnida
- Superorder: Parasitiformes
- Order: Holothyrida

Families
- See text.

Diversity
- 10 genera, > 25 species

= Holothyrida =

Order of mites

The Holothyrida are a small order of mites in the superorder Parasitiformes. No fossils are known. With body lengths of more than 2 mm (3/32 in) they are relatively large mites, with a heavily sclerotized body. It is divided into three families, Allothyridae, Holothyridae, and Neothyridae. In a 1998 experimental study, members of the family Allothyridae were found to ignore living animals but readily fed on the body fluids of dead arthropods, making them scavengers.

The order has a distribution largely confined to former Gondwanan landmasses. They are the sister group to Ixodida (ticks).

== Systematics ==
=== Allothyridae ===
Allothyridae van der Hammen, 1972 — Australia, New Zealand

- Allothyrus van der Hammen, 1961

- Allothyrus australasiae (Womersley, 1935)
- Allothyrus constrictus (Domrow, 1955)

- Australothyrus van der Hammen, 1983

- Australothyrus ocellatus van der Hammen, 1983

=== Holothyridae ===
Holothyridae Thorell, 1882 Sri Lanka, Indian Ocean islands, New Guinea, New Caledonia

- Sternothyrus Lehtinen, 1995
  - Sternothyrus braueri (Thon, 1905) — Seychelles
- Lindothyrus Lehtinen, 1995
  - Lindothyrus elongatus Lehtinen, 1995 — Lord Howe Island
  - Lindothyrus rubellus Lehtinen, 1995 — New Caledonia
- Indothyrus Lehtinen, 1995
  - Indothyrus greeni Lehtinen, 1995 — Sri Lanka
- Haplothyrus Lehtinen, 1995
  - Haplothyrus expolitissimus (Berlese, 1924) — New Caledonia
  - Haplothyrus hyatti Lehtinen, 1995 — unknown locality
- Holothyrus Gervais, 1842 — Mauritius
  - Holothyrus coccinella Gervais, 1842
  - Holothyrus legendrei Hammen, 1983
- Hammenius Lehtinen, 1981
  - Hammenius armatus (Canestrini, 1897) — Tamara Island (Aitape): New Guinea
  - Hammenius berlesei (Lehtinen, 1995) — New Guinea
  - Hammenius braueri (Thon, 1906)
  - Hammenius fujuge Lehtinen, 1981 — New Guinea (Central District, Oro Province)
  - Hammenius grandjeani (Hammen, 1961) — Mount Bosavi: New Guinea
  - Hammenius holthuisi van der Hammen, 1983
  - Hammenius ingii Lehtinen, 1981 — New Guinea
  - Hammenius insularis Lehtinen, 1995 — Louisiade Archipelago: New Guinea
  - Hammenius longipes (Thorell, 1882) — Fly River, New Guinea (?)
  - Hammenius mendi (Lehtinen, 1995) — Strickland River: New Guinea
  - Hammenius montanus Hammen, 1983 — Irian Jaya
  - Hammenius niger (Thon, 1906)

=== Neothyridae ===
Neothyridae Lehtinen, 1981 Northern South America and the Caribbean

- Diplothyrus Lehtinen, 1999 Brazil, French Guiana
  - Diplothyrus schubarti Lehtinen, 1999
  - Diplothyrus lecorrei Klompen, 2010
  - Diplothyrus lehtineni Vázquez & de Araújo & Feres, 2016
- Neothyrus Lehtinen, 1981 Peru
  - Neothyrus ana Lehtinen, 1981
- Caribothyrus Kontschán & Mahunka, 2004 Dominican Republic
  - Caribothyrus barbatus Kontschán & Mahunka, 2004
