= Carl Johannes With =

Danish doctor and arachnologist

Carl Johannes With (11 December 1877 – 16 June 1923) was a Danish medical doctor and arachnologist, specialising in pseudoscorpions and mites.

With was born in Lemvig to Nicolai Rasmus With and his wife Rasmine Sophie Dorothea With, but was orphaned by the age of five. With married Inge Kiørboe on 1 July 1909, and together they had three children. With died in 1923 in Skibstrup, in the parish of Hellebæk (Helsingør Municipality), while still working on a dissertation on lupus.

== Zoological career ==
After studying at the University of Oxford in 1896, With studied natural history and geography, and in 1904, undertook a research trip to England and in particular, the collections of the British Museum. In 1905, he won the Schibbye'ske Præmie (Schibbye Prize) for his work on Opilioacariformes.

== Medical career ==
With was not confident that zoology could provide a secure future, so he studied medicine, including time at the Institut Pasteur in Paris. He took part in the Franco–Danish leprosy expedition to the Danish West Indies in 1909, graduated in 1911, and then started to work as a dermatologist at the University Hospital and Municipal Hospital in Copenhagen.
