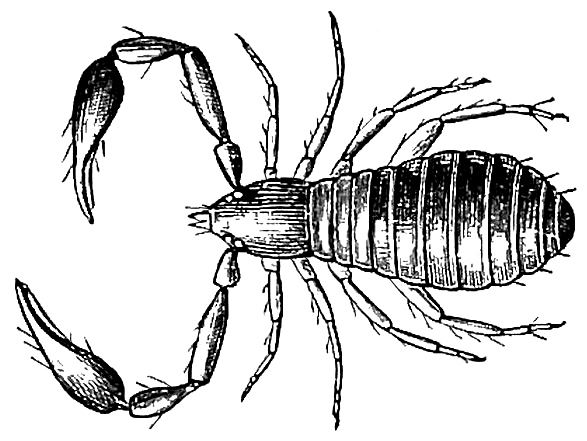

Scientific classification
- Kingdom: Animalia
- Phylum: Arthropoda
- Subphylum: Chelicerata
- Class: Arachnida
- Order: Pseudoscorpiones
- Superfamily: Garypoidea
- Family: Olpiidae; Banks, 1895

= Olpiidae =

Olpiidae Temporal range: Palaeogene–present

Family of pseudoscorpions

Olpiidae is a family of pseudoscorpions in the superfamily Garypoidea. It contains the following genera:

== Distribution and habitat ==
They occur in a wide variety of microhabitats, including litter, soil, moss, under stones or in decaying logs, and they inhabit all terrestrial ecosystems except the Polar regions.

== Genus ==
- Antillolpium Muchmore, 1991
- Aphelolpium Hoff, 1964
- Apolpium J. C. Chamberlin, 1930
- Austrohorus Beier, 1966
- Banksolpium Muchmore, 1986
- Beierolpium Heurtault, 1976
- Calocheiridius Beier & Turk, 1952
- Calocheirus J. C. Chamberlin, 1930
- Cardiolpium Mahnert, 1986
- Ectactolpium Beier, 1947
- Euryolpium Redikorzev, 1938
- Halominniza ahnert, 1975
- Hesperolpium J. C. Chamberlin, 1930
- Heterolpium Sivaraman, 1980
- Hoffhorus Heurtault, 1976
- Horus J. C. Chamberlin, 1930
- Indolpium Hoff, 1945
- Leptolpium Tooren, 2002
- Linnaeolpium Harvey & Leng, 2008
- Minniza E. Simon, 1881
- Nanolpium Beier, 1947
- Neopachyolpium Hoff, 1945
- Nipponogarypus Morikawa, 1955
- Novohorus Hoff, 1945
- Olpiolum Beier, 1931
- Olpium L. Koch, 1873
- Pachyolpium Beier, 1931
- Parolpium Beier, 1931
- Planctolpium Hoff, 1964
- Progarypus Beier, 1931
- Pseudohorus Beier, 1946
- Stenolpiodes Beier, 1959
- Stenolpium Beier, 1955
- Xenolpium J. C. Chamberlin, 1930
