= Veigaiidae =

Scientific classification
- Kingdom: Animalia
- Phylum: Arthropoda
- Subphylum: Chelicerata
- Class: Arachnida
- Order: Mesostigmata
- Family: Veigaiidae; Oudemans, 1939

Diversity
- 4 genera, c. 60 species

Synonyms
- Veigaiaidae; Veigaidae

Family of mites

Veigaiidae is a family of mites belonging to the superorder Parasitiformes. They are not parasitic but free-living and predatory and are found in soil and decaying organic matter. Some species are specialists of rocky shorelines. Members of this family can be distinguished by a hyaline appendage on the tarsus of the pedipalp.

== Genera ==
- Cyrthydrolaelaps Berlese, 1904
- Gamasolaelaps Berlese, 1903
- Gorirossia Farrier, 1957
- Veigaia Oudemans, 1905
