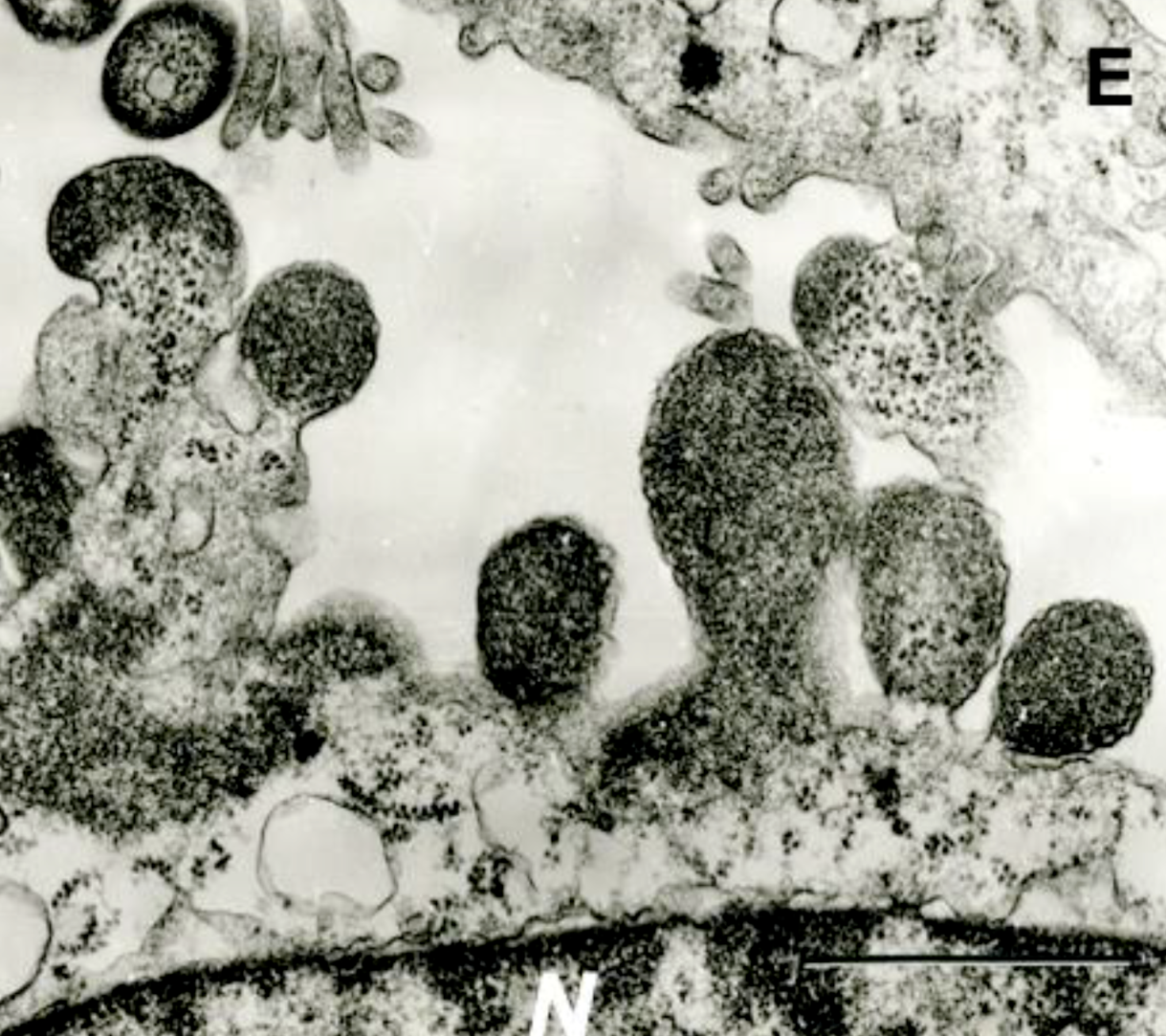

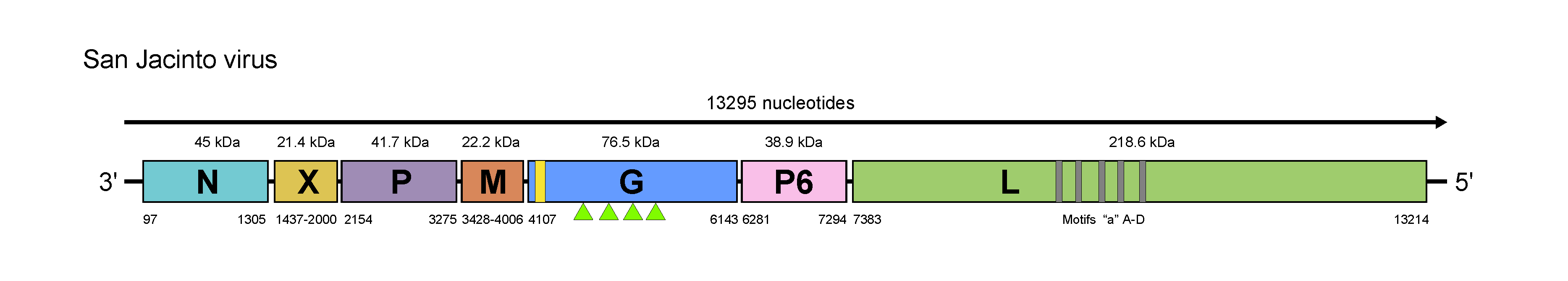
- Virions of San Jacinto virus forming at infected cell's surface and virus genome

Virus classification
- (unranked): Virus
- Realm: Riboviria
- Kingdom: Orthornavirae
- Phylum: Negarnaviricota
- Class: Monjiviricetes
- Order: Mononegavirales
- Family: Nyamiviridae

= Nyamiviridae =

Family of viruses

Nyamiviridae is a family of negative-strand RNA viruses in the order Mononegavirales. Ecdysozoa and birds serve as natural hosts. The name is a portmanteau of Nyamanini Pan (place of isolation of type species Nyamanini virus in South Africa) and Midway Atoll (place of isolation of Midway virus in the United States) and the suffix -viridae used to denote a virus family. There are seven genera in this family.

== History ==
Nyamanini virus (NYMV) and Midway virus (MDWV) were first isolated in 1957 and 1966 respectively. NYMV has been isolated from cattle egrets (species Bubulcus ibis) and ticks (species Argas walkerae) in Egypt, India, Nigeria, South Africa, and Thailand. MDWV has been isolated from ticks of the genus Ornithodoros collected in Midway, Kure and Manana islands and northern Honshu, Japan. Antibodies to this virus have been found in the black-tailed gull (species Larus crassirostris) and black-crowned night heron (species Nycticorax nycticorax).

== Structure ==
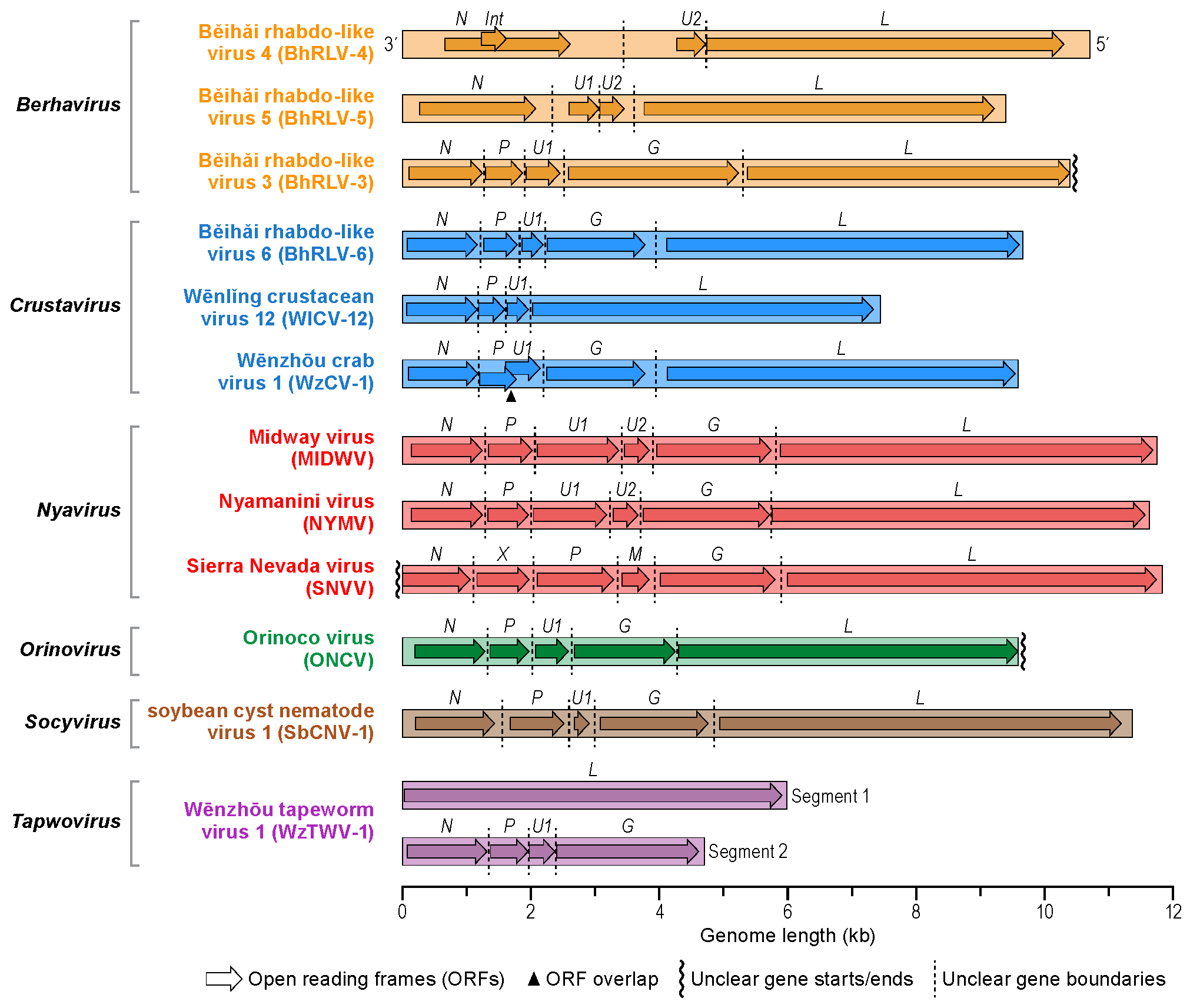
Genomes of different nyamiviruses

Nyamivirions are enveloped, with spherical geometries. Their diameters are around 100 to 130 nm. Nyamiviral genomes are linear, nonsegmented and bisegmented, and around 11.6 kbp in total length. The nyamiviral genome codes for six proteins. Of these, only two have been assigned a function: the putative nucleocapsid protein and RNA-dependent RNA polymerase.

== Life cycle ==
Viral replication is nuclear. Entry into the host cell is achieved by attachment of the viral GP glycoproteins to host receptors, which mediates clathrin-mediated endocytosis. Replication follows the negative stranded RNA virus replication model. Negative stranded RNA virus transcription, using polymerase stuttering is the method of transcription. The virus progeny are released by budding from the infected cells. Ticks and birds serve as the natural host.

== Taxonomy ==
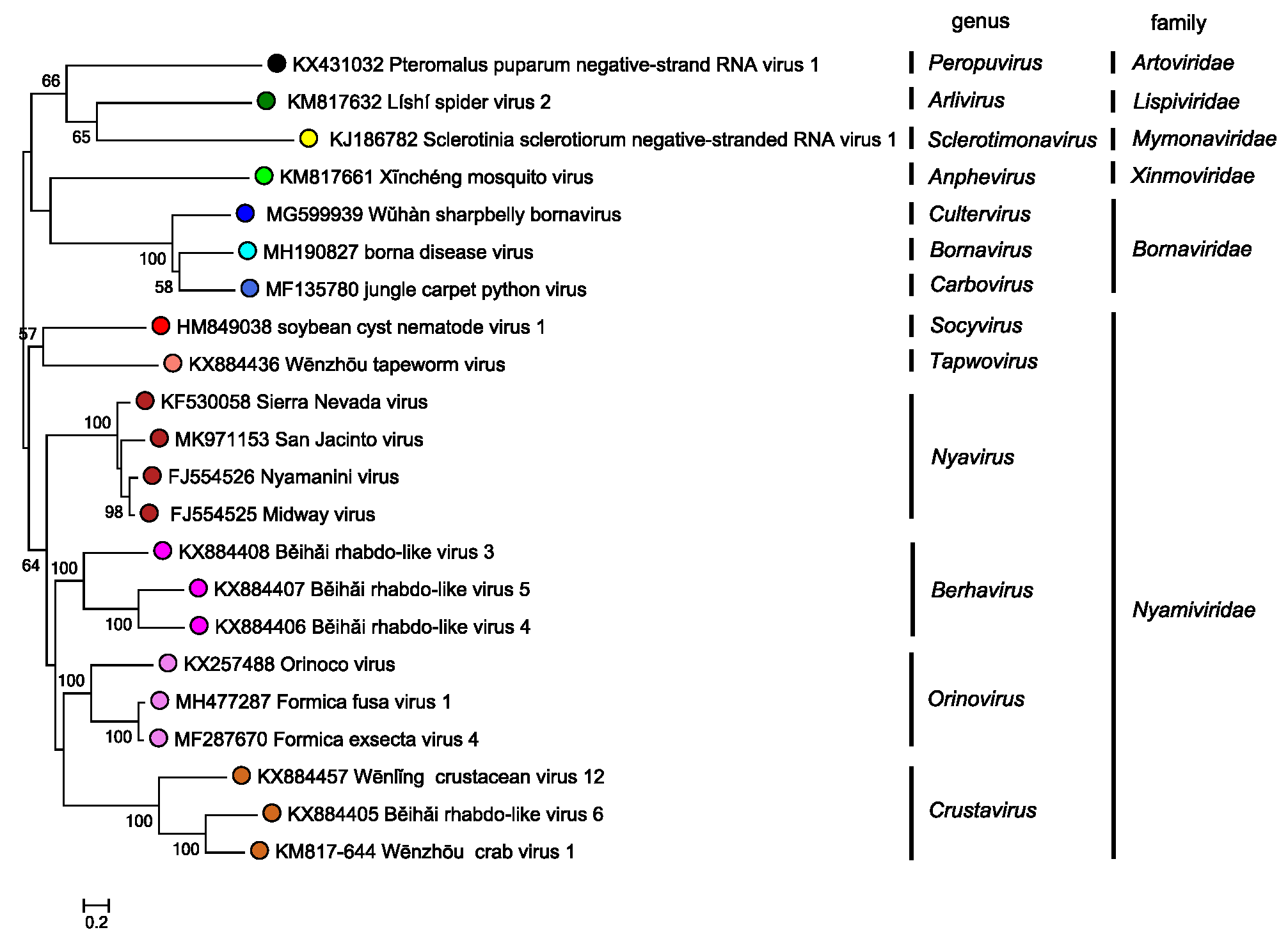
Phylogenetic tree of Nyamiviridae

The family contains the following genera:

- Berhavirus
- Crustavirus
- Formlvirus
- Nyavirus
- Orinovirus
- Socyvirus
- Tapwovirus
