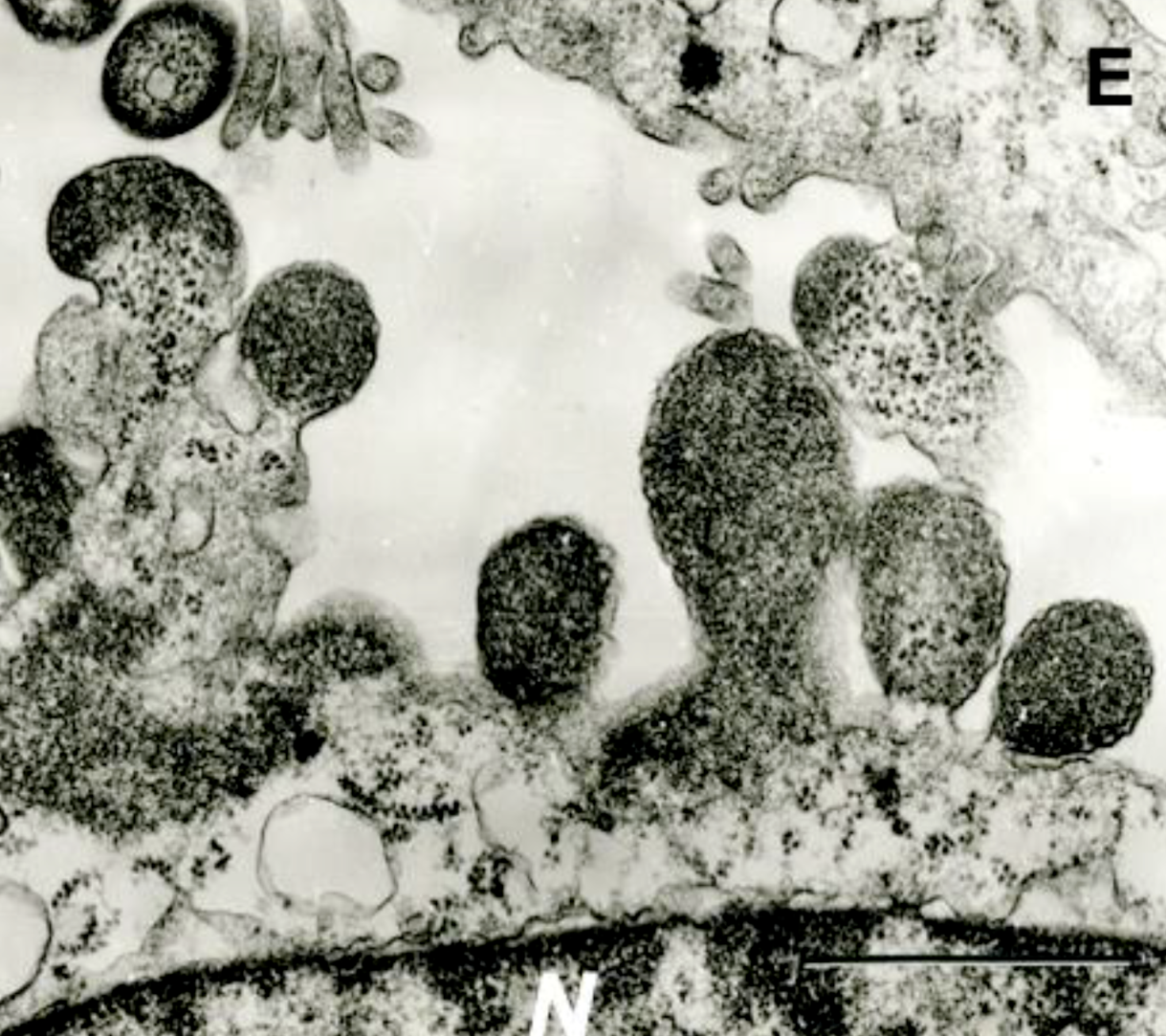

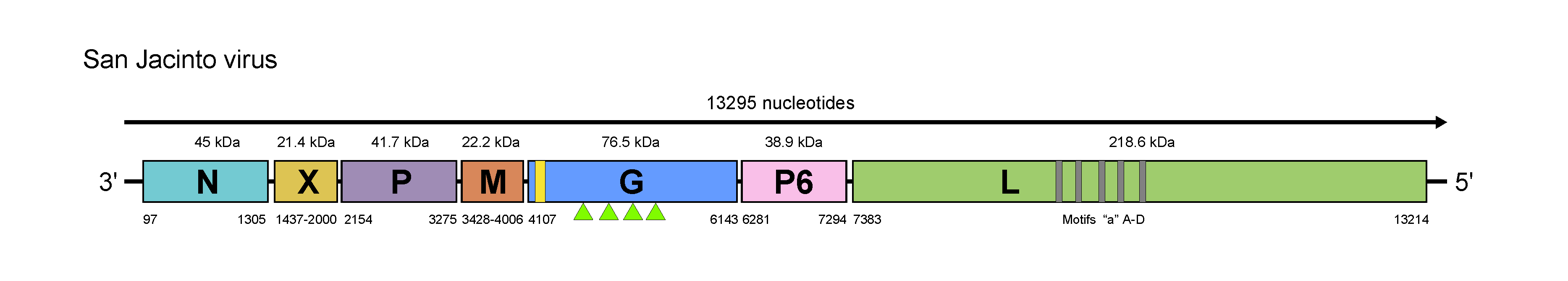
- Virions of San Jacinto virus forming at infected cell's surface and virus genome

Virus classification
- (unranked): Virus
- Realm: Riboviria
- Kingdom: Orthornavirae
- Phylum: Negarnaviricota
- Class: Monjiviricetes
- Order: Mononegavirales
- Family: Nyamiviridae
- Genus: Nyavirus

= Nyavirus =

Genus of viruses

Nyavirus is a genus of negative-strand RNA viruses in the family Nyamiviridae. Ticks and birds serve as natural hosts. There are seven species in this genus.

== History ==
Nyamanini virus (NYMV) and Midway virus (MDWV) were first isolated in 1957 and 1966 respectively. NYMV has been isolated from cattle egrets (species Bubulcus ibis) and ticks (species Argas walkerae) in Egypt, India, Nigeria, South Africa, and Thailand. MDWV has been isolated from tick of the genus Ornithodoros collected in Midway, Kure and Manana islands and northern Honshu, Japan. Antibodies to this virus have been found in the black-tailed gulls (species Larus crassirostris) and black-crowned night herons (species Nycticorax nycticorax).

== Structure ==
Nyaviruses are enveloped, with spherical geometries. The diameter is around 100 to 130 nm. Genomes are linear, nonsegmented, and around 11.6 kbp in total length. The genome codes for 6 proteins. Their genomes contain six open reading frames. Of these, only two have been assigned a function: the putative nucleocapsid protein and RNA-dependent RNA polymerase.

== Life cycle ==
Viral replication is nuclear. Entry into the host cell is achieved by attachment of the viral GP glycoproteins to host receptors, which mediates clathrin-mediated endocytosis. Replication follows the negative stranded RNA virus replication model. Negative stranded RNA virus transcription, using polymerase stuttering is the method of transcription. Progeny viruses are released by budding off from the host cell wall. Ticks and birds serve as the natural host.

== Taxonomy ==
The genus contains the following species, listed by scientific name and followed by the exemplar virus of the species:

- Nyavirus argatis, Sekira virus
- Nyavirus gerbillisci, Toure virus
- Nyavirus midwayense, Midway virus
- Nyavirus nyamaniniense, Nyamanini virus
- Nyavirus sanjacintoense, San Jacinto virus
- Nyavirus sierranevadaense, Sierra Nevada virus
- Nyavirus somateriae, Jeremy Point nyavirus
