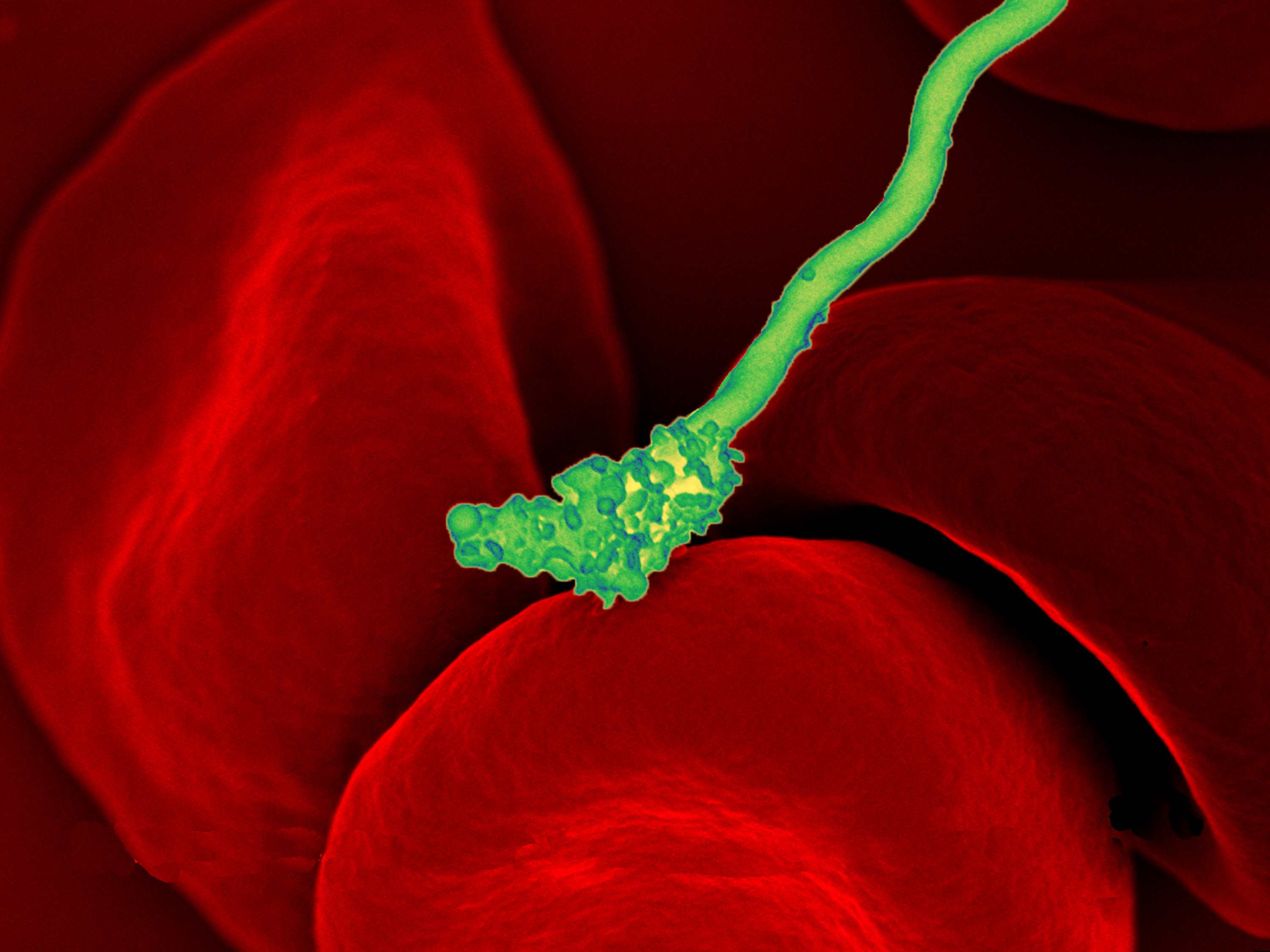
- Borrelia hermsii (green) on red blood cells

Scientific classification
- Domain: Bacteria
- Kingdom: Pseudomonadati
- Phylum: Spirochaetota (Spirochaetes)
- Class: Spirochaetia
- Order: Spirochaetales
- Family: Borreliaceae
- Genus: Borrelia
- Species: B. hermsii

Binomial name
- Borrelia hermsii (Davis, 1942) Steinhaus, 1946

= Borrelia hermsii =

Species of bacterium

Borrelia hermsii is a spirochete bacterium representing the endemic causative agent of tick-borne relapsing fever in western regions of North America (more specifically, the western United States, and British Columbia region of Canada). It is spread by the soft-bodied tick Ornithodoros hermsi. Human infections characteristically occur among campers and people temporarily lodging in wooden accommodations in proximity to rodents. Human disease is usually relatively mild with low fever.

== Epidemiology ==
B. hermsii is endemic to regions of the U.S. with high elevation (whereas B. turicatae is endemic to low-lying regions such as Texas and Florida).

Borrelia hermsii express a surface protein called FhbA. This protein evades the immune system by binding to FH and FHL-1, which are regulators of the complement system. This prevents the immune system from attacking bacteria. The FhbA is a surface-exposed lipoprotein that encodes for a single-genetic locus. It has a high affinity for binding to FH and recombinant FH. It has an important role in bacterial survival and therefore can be used for diagnosis- FhbA genes are mingled with majority of relapsing fever clade.
