= Ornithodoros alactagalis =

Scientific classification
- Domain: Eukaryota
- Kingdom: Animalia
- Phylum: Arthropoda
- Subphylum: Chelicerata
- Class: Arachnida
- Order: Ixodida
- Family: Argasidae
- Genus: Ornithodoros
- Species: O. alactagalis

Binomial name
- Ornithodoros alactagalis Issaakjan, 1936

Species of tick

Ornithodoros alactagalis, the relapsing fever tick, is a species of soft tick in the family Argasidae.
