= Ornithodoros brasiliensis =

Scientific classification
- Kingdom: Animalia
- Phylum: Arthropoda
- Subphylum: Chelicerata
- Class: Arachnida
- Order: Ixodida
- Family: Argasidae
- Genus: Ornithodoros
- Species: O. brasiliensis

Binomial name
- Ornithodoros brasiliensis Aragão, 1923

Synonyms
- Alectorobius (Theriodoros) brasiliensis Camicas et al., 1998; Argas brasiliensis Pinto, 1938; Ornithodoros (Pavlovskyella) brasiliensis Clifford, Kohls & Sonenshine, 1964

Species of spider

Ornithodoros brasiliensis is a species of tick in the family Argasidae, or soft-bodied ticks, that occurs exclusively in Rio Grande do Sul, Brazil. O. brasiliensis is a known parasite of humans, dogs, and smaller mammals such as armadillos and skunks.

== Life cycle ==
O. brasiliensis hatches from an egg into its larval state. The larval stage does not need to feed, and molts to a nymphal stage after roughly a week. The nymph will seek to feed within two days of molting, noticeably faster than other ticks in the genus Ornithodoros. The ticks will progress through a total of 4-7 nymphal stages, spending roughly 30 days in each stage, before developing into adults.

== Effects on host ==
=== Tick toxicosis ===
O. brasiliensis, like many other ticks, causes tick toxicosis in its host at the location of the bite. Tick toxicosis includes all of the non-infectious complications following a tick bite, caused by compounds found in the tick's saliva. O. brasiliensis bites have been observed to vary widely in their intensity of symptoms on a case-by-case basis. The symptoms include: slow healing lesions, blistering, localized swelling, muscle and cell degradation, and pruritus. Symptoms from these bites have been reported to last as long as 20 weeks after the occurrence of the bite.

=== Vector transmission ===
O. brasiliensis has been proven capable of carrying the microorganism Borrelia brasiliensis, a source of Lyme disease, in laboratory conditions, but no cases of vector transmission in the wild have been reported.
