= Alkhurma virus =

Species of virus

Alkhurma hemorrhagic fever (AHF)
- Other names: Alkhurma hemorrhagic fever virus (AHFV)
- Specialty: Infectious disease (medical specialty)
- Symptoms: Mild symptoms: Fever, chills, headache, vomiting Severe symptoms: Epistaxis, purpura, leukopenia
- Complications: Thrombocytopenia, meningoencephalitis
- Causes: Alkhurma virus
- Diagnostic method: Molecular detection of PCR, virus isolation, serologic testing
- Prevention: Tick repellents, limit contact with animals
- Treatment: Supportive therapy, monitoring of blood pressure and oxygen status

Alkhurma virus (ALKV) (Arabic: فيروس الخرمة) is a zoonotic virus of the Flaviviridae virus family (class IV). ALKV causes Alkhurma hemorrhagic fever (AHF), or alternatively termed as Alkhurma hemorrhagic fever virus, and is mainly based in Saudi Arabia.

== Signs and symptoms ==
After an incubation period lasting as short as 2–4 days or as long as 8 days, people with AHF develop symptoms including fever, headache, joint pain, muscle pain, vomiting, a loss of appetite, feeling of great discomfort, and chills. Less than 10% of people develop severe neurologic, central nervous system, and hemorrhagic symptoms, such as purpura, epistaxis, hallucinations, disorientation, convulsions, and life-threatening epistaxis. Elevated liver enzymes, leukopenia, proteinuria and thrombocytopenia, which leads to hemorrhagic fever and encephalitis (which can result in death), have been found in hospitalized patients.

== Taxonomy ==
Alkhurma virus
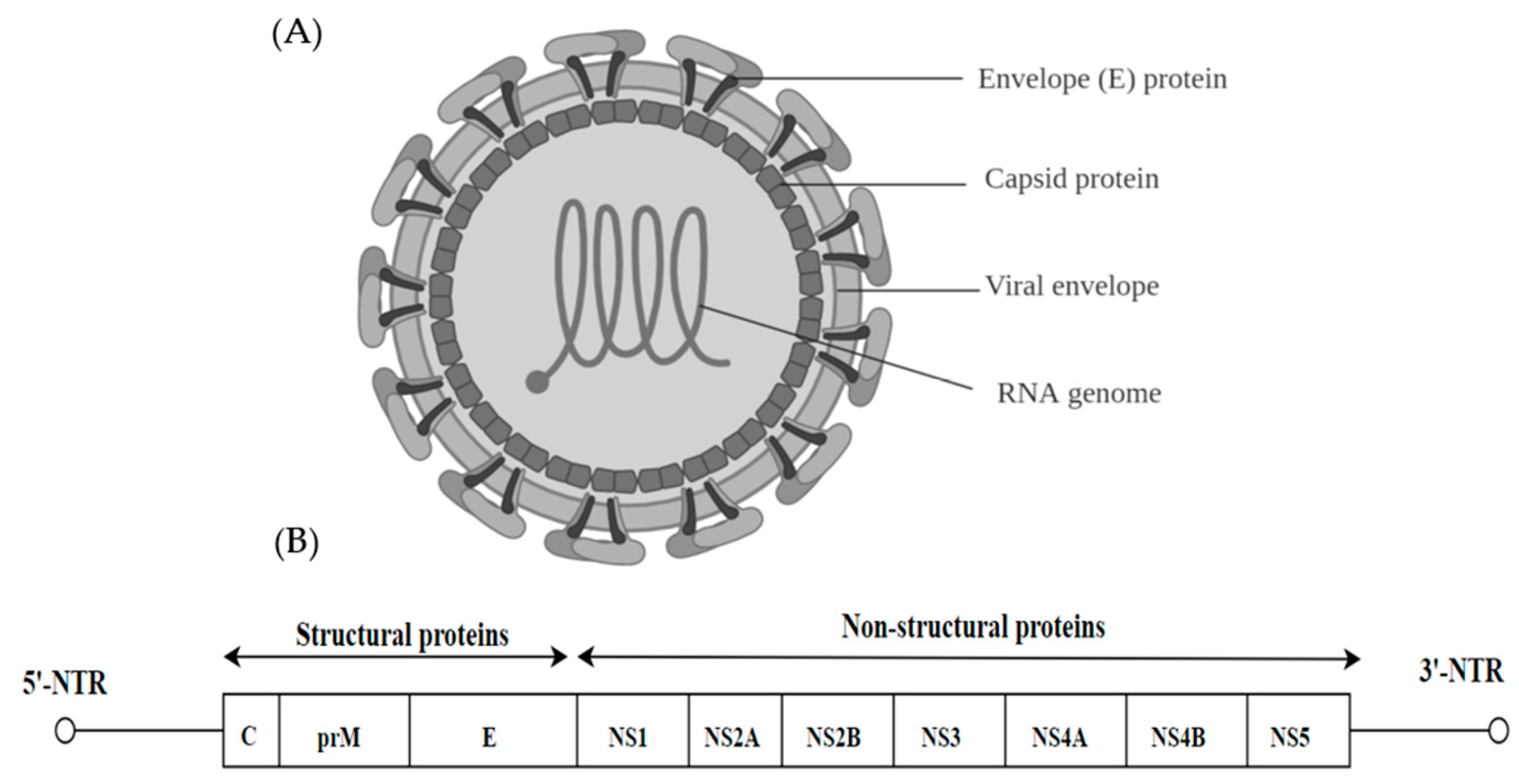
- Flavivirus structure and genome

Virus classification
- (unranked): Virus
- Realm: Riboviria
- Kingdom: Orthornavirae
- Phylum: Kitrinoviricota
- Class: Flasuviricetes
- Order: Amarillovirales
- Family: Flaviviridae
- Genus: Orthoflavivirus
- Species: Orthoflavivirus kyasanurense
- Strain: Alkhurma virus

The ALKV prototype strain 1776 was retrieved from a person in Saudi Arabia during the 1990s. It was found to contain over 10,000 nucleotides, with a single ORF encoding over 3,000 amino acid polyproteins. The AnhC, PrM, M, NS2A, NS2B, NS3, NS4A, 2K, NS4B and NS5 proteins are all of the same length. ALKV owns the largest polyprotein of all TB-flaviviruses calculated as of yet. ALKV has been found to be closely related to the Kyasanur Forest disease (KFD), with which it shares 89% nucleotide sequence homology. Close similarities indicate that these viruses diverged 700 years ago. Related viruses include Omsk hemorrhagic fever and Royal Farm virus.

== Diagnosis ==
Laboratory diagnosis of ALKV can be performed in the early stages of the illness by molecular detection of PCR or virus isolation from the blood. Serologic testing using enzyme-linked immunosorbent serologic assay (ELISA) can be made afterward. Treatment consists of supportive therapy which balances the person's fluids and electrolytes, oxygen status and blood pressure monitored and maintained, and additional treatment for any further complications. The mortality rate of hospitalized patients ranges from 1 to 20%.

== Treatment ==
Due to limited information pertaining to ALKV, no specific treatment, such as a vaccine, has been created or made readily available. The best measures for combating ALKV are basic tick bite prevention, such as using tick repellents and avoiding regions where ticks are found in abundance, and raising awareness. Limiting non-casual contact with livestock and domestic animals is also another way of prevention. Individuals should appropriately check for attached ticks and remove them as soon as possible if found. Tick collars for domestic animals and the use of acaricides are efficient in killing ticks on livestock. People working with animals or animal products in farms or slaughterhouses should refrain from making unprotected contact with the blood, tissues, or fluids (such as consuming unpasteurized milk) of any potentially infected animal.

== Epidemiology ==
The route of transmission for ALKV is not fully understood and is filled with huge knowledge gaps, though camels and sheep have been linked to be the natural hosts of this virus. There appears to be more than one possible route of transmission seen in people who have become infected with this virus: one or more bites by an infected tick, crushing an infected tick with unprotected fingers, ingestion of unpasteurised camel milk, or entry via a skin wound. There is evidence pointing to the sand tampan, Ornithodoros savignyi, as the vector. No cases of human-human transmission of AHF have ever been recorded.

The geographic distribution of the virus has extended beyond Saudi Arabia; reports of ALKV have been documented in countries where there is no endemic vector of the disease, such as Egypt, Djibouti, and India.

As a response to the troubling illness, the KSA (Kingdom of Saudi Arabia) is treating ALKV as one of the nationally notifiable diseases in the country. An effective surveillance system was established by the Ministry of Health, where any suspected case of ALKV must be reported immediately. Three forms must be filled out to properly ensure the virus is being sufficiently monitored: A suspect case form, an epidemiological investigation form, and a laboratory requisition form. The hospitals and health centers, either governmental or private, report the potential ALKV case to the desk officers in charge of viral hemorrhagic fevers at the Directorate of Health Affairs in their respective regions. Afterward, the desk officer forwards the report to the Directorate of Infectious Diseases at the Preventive Medicine Department at the Ministry of Health. Before entering the case into the database system, the desk officer in charge of AHFV reviews the case reports for accuracy and completion. Subsequently, the desk officer at the Ministry of Health formulates daily reports for the higher directors at the Ministry of Health and forwards them as feedback to the regions and their respective health units.

In 2018, the tick species H. rufipes, another possible vector for this virus, has been found to be infecting migratory birds in Europe.

== History ==
This virus was first isolated from the blood of a 32-year-old male butcher at Dr. Soliman Fakeeh Hospital, Saudi Arabia during the 1990s, who became sick with an acute, fatal hemorrhagic fever after slaughtering a sheep imported from the small city of A Khurmah, Mecca province. Since then, over 40 cases of ALKV, with case fatality rates less than 1%, have been reported. ALKV is classified as a BSL-3 or BSL-4 agent, depending on the country's regulations.
