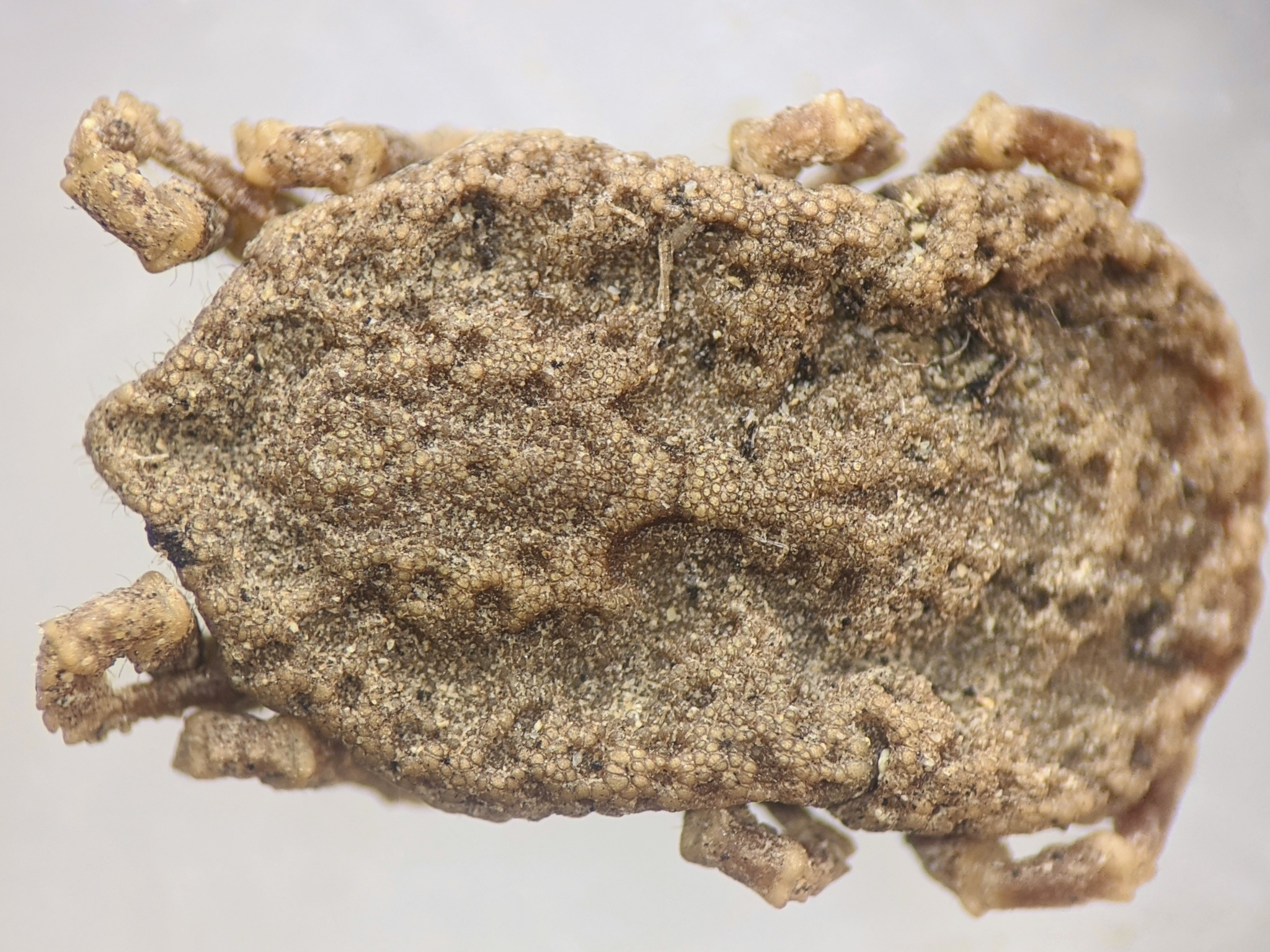
- Dorsal view of a Pajahuello Tick

Scientific classification
- Kingdom: Animalia
- Phylum: Arthropoda
- Subphylum: Chelicerata
- Class: Arachnida
- Order: Ixodida
- Family: Argasidae
- Genus: Ornithodoros
- Species: O. coriaceus

Binomial name
- Ornithodoros coriaceus Koch, 1884

Synonyms
- Alectorobius coriaceus Camicas & Morel, 1977; Argas coriaceus Murray, 1877

= Ornithodoros coriaceus =

Species of tick

Ornithodoros coriaceus, the Pajahuello or Pajahuello tick, is a tick that feeds on the blood of mammals and birds. It is widely distributed throughout western North America from southern Mexico to Oregon. Although this species rarely bites humans (and is not known to transmit any disease to humans) its bite is considered to be particularly painful. It is the primary vector of the bacterium that causes Epizootic Bovine Abortion, a severe and commercially-important disease afflicting domestic cattle.

== Etymology ==
The genus name of this species comes from the Greek roots ornitho– (bird) and –doros (gift). The epithet coriaceus (leathery) refers to the texture of the cuticle, which is tough but softer than those of the more familiar hard-backed ticks (Ixodidae).

The name Pajahuello was introduced by Banks in 1904, and was reiterated under this name by Furman and Loomis. This name appears to have stabilized as the common name most widely used in academic literature (although note that the EBA bacterium of which it is the vector references the pajaroello variant). Other colloquial names are very similar-sounding, including pajaronela (used in the Santa Lucia Mountains of coastal California), and pajaroello. Possible etymological origins include paja– (straw, either in reference to their coloration or locations in which they are encountered), pajaro– (bird, in reference to their occasional hosts), huello– (footprint, either in reference to their occurrence in bedding areas of cattle, or the shape of their bodies).

According to Furman and Loomis, the residents of the Isthmus of Tehuantepec call this species talajas, roughly connoting "havoc" or "destruction".

== Description ==
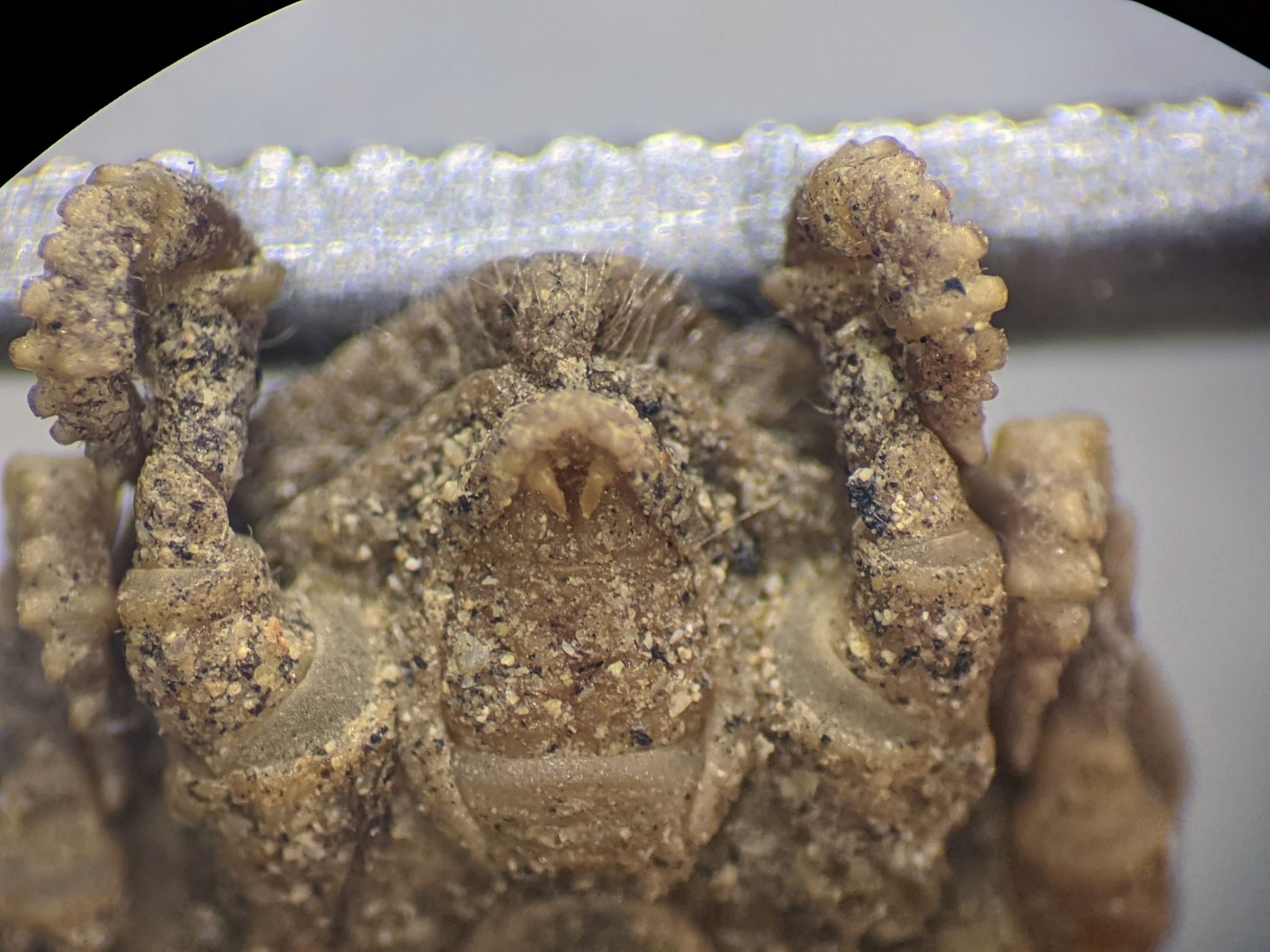
Ventral view of a pajahuello tick showing the mouthparts and tubercled front legs.

Ornithodoros coriaceus is a relatively large tick, with adults measuring approximately 7–10 mm long. The shape of the body is distinctive, having no demarcated scutum, a pointed anterior end (giving it a 'nosed' appearance), and more or less parallel sides. The upper cuticle is pale beige-tan or grayish tan-brown in color, and has a granular ornamentation of bumps and pockmarks (described in the literature as shagreen). The distal segments of the legs have a warted appearance. Nymphs are similar in appearance to adults, but have six legs (the full arachnid complement of eight legs appears after the final instar molt).

Of the six species of Ornithodoros that are common within its range, O. coriaceus is the only one without a visible dorsal scutum and with mouthparts that are obscured when viewed from above. In combination with the unusual body shape, large size, and distinctive coloration, these features allow for fairly reliable species-level field identification of O. coriaceus.

Although more difficult to observe, other distinctive features of this species include the presence of eyes along the margin of the body (unlike all other congeners in its range), and the presence of tubercles on the dorsal side of the tarsi. The mouthparts are very different in structure from those of most other ticks, appearing more 'fang-like' than lance-like.

== Life cycle ==
From Teglas et al., 2005:

"Larvae, nymphs, and adults [of O. coriaceus] spend most of their life off of the host in the leaf litter or soil near the bedding sites of deer and cattle (Garcia, 1963). Adults feed to repletion, typically within an hour, and mate. Adult females then seek refuge beneath leaf litter to deposit eggs. These eggs hatch and the resulting larvae attach to an appropriate vertebrate host in response to heat and carbon dioxide (Garcia, 1963). Larval O. coriaceus feed for 10-14 days before dropping off and molting to the first nymphal stage. Depending on environmental conditions, the nymphs may feed on three to seven hosts, dropping and molting after each blood meal, before ultimately developing into the adult stage (Smith, 1944, Garcia, 1963)."

Smith (1944) provides an extremely detailed description of the maturation of each instar of O. coriaceus. Herms (1916) studied the biting and feeding habits of O. coriaceus in an experimental setting using mice, rabbits, and rhesus macaques as hosts.

== Range ==
This species is widespread in western North America, ranging from southern Mexico northward to Oregon and Idaho, and east to Nevada. Berlese anecdotally mentions a record from domestic cattle in Paraguay.

As with many invertebrate parasites, its small size and relatively low dispersal ability suggest that its biogeography is largely shaped by the movements of its host animals.

The greater the length of time that a tick can remain attached to its host, the greater its chances for long-distance dispersal; as such the relatively long feeding bouts (especially of the nymphal stage) of this species, have been proposed as a major mechanism of dispersal (Bushnell et al.,1991).

Researchers investigating new reports of Epizootic Bovine Abortion (a disease of cattle vectored by this tick) in areas where it was not previously known to occur in the United States found some geographic-genetic structure in populations of O. coriaceus: A northern and southern clade were approximately separated by the northern boundary of the California state line (Teglas et al., 2005). However, these researchers did not find evidence to suggest that recent large-scale expansion of this species' range had occurred.

== Habitat ==
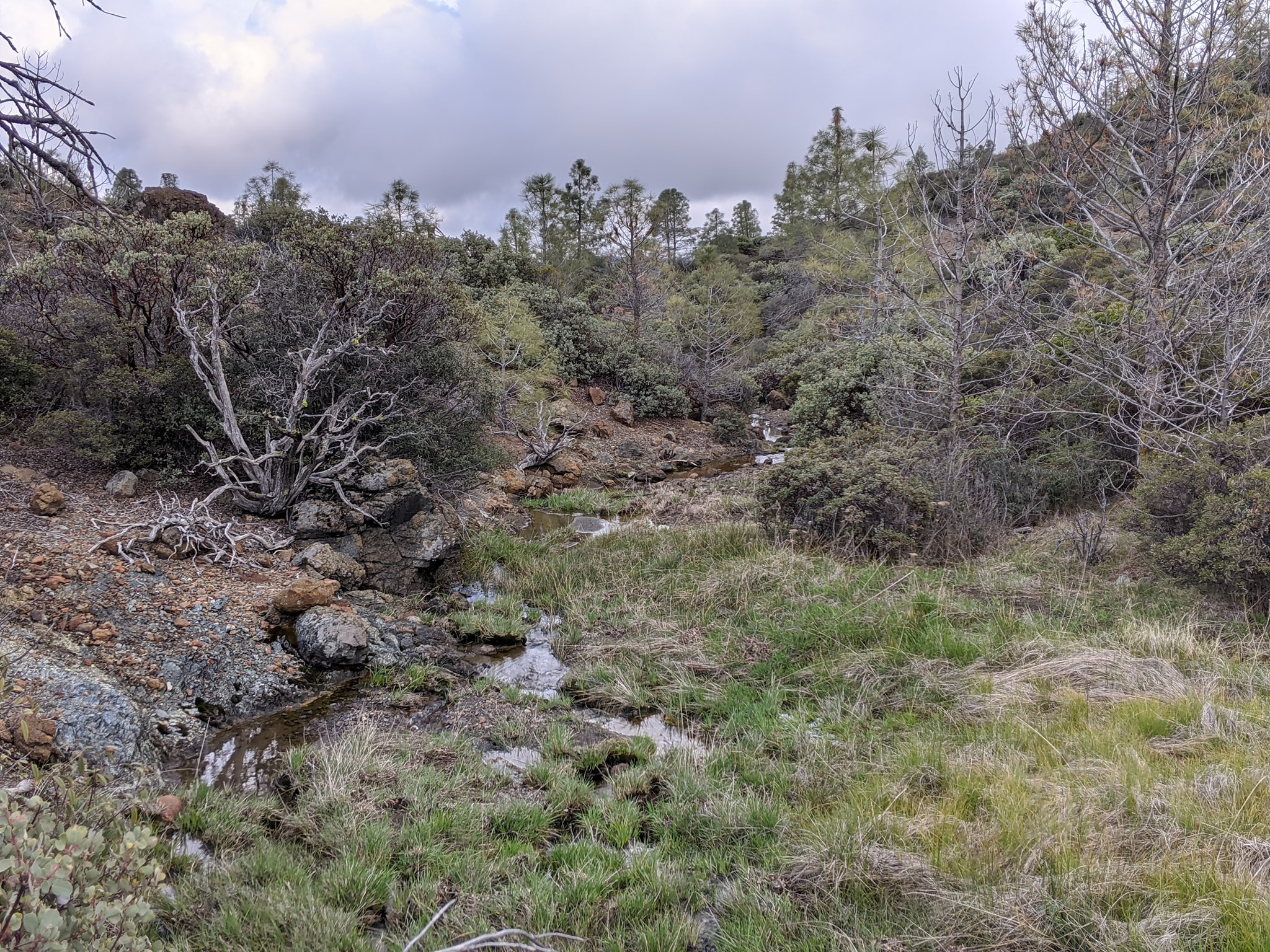
Habitat of Ornithodoros coriaceus

Free-roaming individuals of O. coriaceus are most often found near the bedding areas of deer, or in native habitats exposed to grazing by large numbers of cattle or horses.

Records of this species come from areas with a range of vegetation types including manzanita and scrub-oak chaparral, mountain-mahogany scrub, among cottonwoods, as well in juniper, yellow pine, and piñon pine forests, or among bitterbrush.

Documented occurrences span an elevational range from a few hundred meters above sea level to 2450 m. The occurrence pattern of this species suggests that it may be more common in areas that are relatively drier than nearby habitats dominated by ixodid ticks.

== Ecology ==
=== Hosts in natural settings ===
The most common native hosts for O. coriaceus are large-bodied hoofed mammals including Mule Deer (Odocoileus hemionus), but birds also serve as occasional hosts (especially for nymphs); specific records of bird hosts include Cliff Swallows (Petrochelidon pyrrhonota) and Prairie Falcons (Falco mexicanus).

=== On humans ===
Humans are rarely bitten by Pajahuello Ticks; such cases usually result from prolonged exposure in high-risk sites (e.g. sleeping on the ground in brushy or grassy areas frequented by cattle or near deer bedding areas). However, when bites on humans do occur, they are reportedly extremely painful and have resulted in a small mythology surrounding the Pajahuello (for more accounts, see Herms, 1916).

"The pajahuello is best known because of the severe reaction in humans following exposure to its bite. Initial bites usually result in a localized inflammatory reaction accompanied by a burning sensation and a small nodule that forms around the wound. These symptoms usually disappear within 48 hours, leaving a small, purplish nodule that disappears in 1-2 weeks. In other cases, an umbilicated pustule surrounded by an inflamed, painful, edematous area develops. More severe allergic reactions appear in persons previously bitten and thus sensitized to a substance injected during the tick's blood-feeding process."

– Furman and Loomis, 1984

"For several years previous to beginning his observations on this species, the writer has listened to many harrowing tales about the Pajaroello. No one seemed to know exactly what it was and no one seemed to have collected specimens so as to make accurate identification possible in so far as the writer knew at the time. Complaints came almost exclusively from the more mountainous portions of Santa Clara and San Benito Counties (California). Natives, principally Mexicans, in the vicinity of Mt. Hamilton fear this parasite more than they do the rattlesnake, and tell weird tales of this or that man having lost an arm or leg, and in one instance even death having ensued, as the result of a bite by the Pajaroello. There seems to be a superstition in that region that three bites will result in certain death. The stories all agree in the essential detail that the bite results in an irritating lesion which is slow to heal and often leaves an ugly deep scar."

– Herms, 1916

=== On livestock ===
Domestic animals including horses, cattle, and poultry have all been recorded as hosts for O. coriaceus. In the absence of megafaunal grazing animals, domestic cattle set loose to graze on wild or semi-wild lands may account for a large percentage of available hosts for O. coriaceus on the modern landscape.

=== As a vector of disease ===
==== Epizootic Bovine Abortion (EBA) ====
O. coriaceus is the primary vector of Pajaroellobacter abortibovis, a gram-negative deltaproteobacterium that is the infectious agent causing Epizootic Bovine Abortion in cattle (commonly called 'Foothill Abortion' among ranchers). Although adult cows with prior exposure to the bacterium do not show serious symptoms when re-infected, antibodies cannot be transmitted to developing fetal calves. Thus the primary impact on herds is due to very high rates of calf loss, in some cases up to 90% of a herd's seasonal offspring. Although vaccination and management strategies can significantly reduce the impact of the disease on herds, EBA continues to cause significant economic losses in the beef industry.

==== African Swine Fever ====
In experimental settings, O. coriaceus has been shown to be capable of transmitting the virus that causes African Swine Fever to pigs.

=== Predators ===
Western fence lizards (Sceloporus occidentalis) have been observed eating adult O. coriaceus (Garcia, 1963), while ants and Phidippus jumping spiders been observed depredating the nymphal stages.
