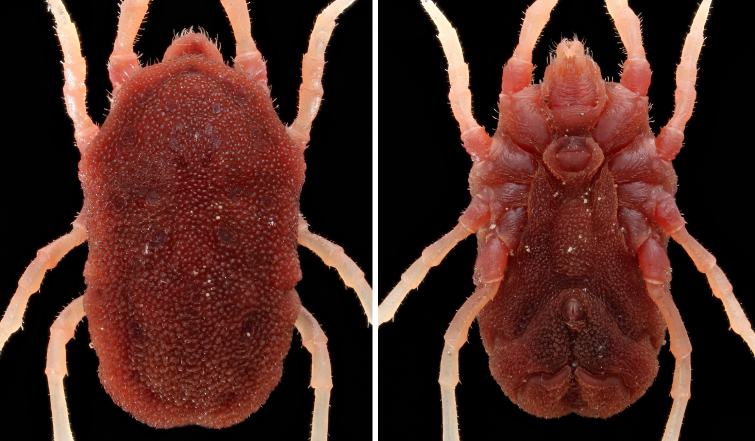
- Ornithodoros turicata female

Scientific classification
- Domain: Eukaryota
- Kingdom: Animalia
- Phylum: Arthropoda
- Subphylum: Chelicerata
- Class: Arachnida
- Order: Ixodida
- Family: Argasidae
- Genus: Ornithodoros
- Species: O. turicata

Binomial name
- Ornithodoros turicata (Dugès, 1876)

= Ornithodoros turicata =

Species of tick

Ornithodoros turicata, commonly referred to as the relapsing fever tick, is a soft tick found in the midwestern and southwestern United States. It is a known vector of Borrelia turicatae, a spirochete responsible for tick-borne relapsing fever in humans. Additionally, vector competence for the transmission of Leptospira pomona, the agent of canine jaundice, has been demonstrated in a laboratory setting.

== See also ==
- APHC Entomological Sciences Tick Species Page - Ornithodoros turicata
