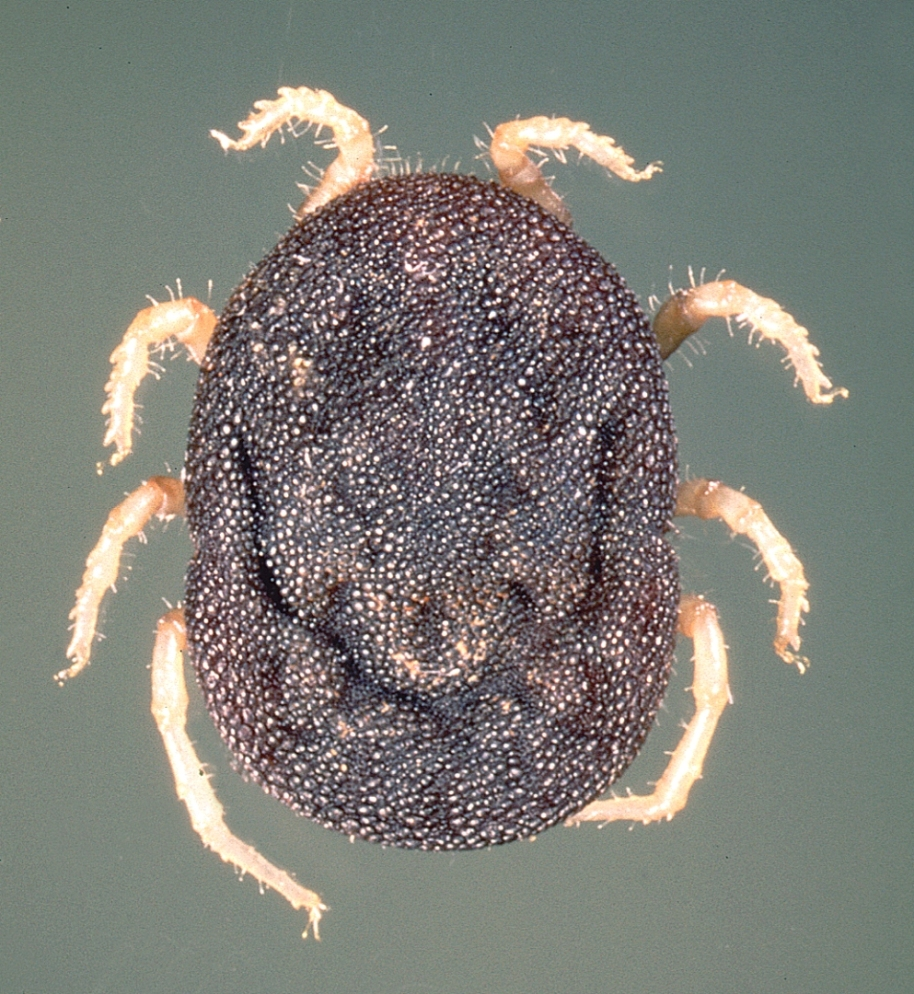
- Dorsal view of adult female

Scientific classification
- Kingdom: Animalia
- Phylum: Arthropoda
- Subphylum: Chelicerata
- Class: Arachnida
- Order: Ixodida
- Family: Argasidae
- Genus: Ornithodoros
- Species: O. savignyi

Binomial name
- Ornithodoros savignyi Audouin, 1827

Synonyms
- Ornithodoros pavimentosus Neumann, 1901

= Ornithodoros savignyi =

Species of tick

Ornithodoros savignyi, known as sand tampan, African eyed tampan or Kalahari sand tampan, is one of some 37 species in the genus Ornithodoros and is a soft tick with a leathery, mammillated integument, causing paralysis and tampan toxicosis, two unrelated conditions. The sand tampan is an ectoparasite on humans, their livestock and wild animals, including birds and bats. Occurring in semi-desert areas of Africa, Saudi Arabia and other parts of the Persian Gulf, India, Sri Lanka and into Asia, it is able to survive for lengthy periods without feeding, spending most of its life burrowed under sand or loose soil, often in wait for animals that rest or sleep under trees or in the lee of rocks, but also in places where people or their animals congregate such as marketplaces, places of worship, cattle kraals and village squares. The timing of its activity is geared to coincide with that of potential hosts, but hot sunny conditions are usually avoided. Because of its habit of feeding and dropping from its host, adult dispersal is limited, whereas larvae may remain attached to their hosts for several days. During its life cycle it will feed on multiple hosts between moults.

This species is of interest because of the pathogens it carries, and its salivary apyrases which prevent platelet activation and aggregation, that is, blood-clotting. In humans the tick may cause dermatitis, fever and lymphadenitis. It is also a carrier of Borrelia, a spirochaete bacterium, and is a carrier of a flavivirus causing Alkhurma hemorrhagic fever (AHFV). The closely related Kyasanur Forest disease virus (KFDV) is endemic to certain regions of India. That AHFV and KFDV diverged some 700 years ago would suggest that unknown tick-borne hemorrhagic/encephalitic viruses may exist between Saudi Arabia and India.

Soft ticks of the family Argasidae lack the hard scutum or shield present in hard ticks of the family Ixodidae. Their gnathosoma or mouth structure is located on the underside of the body and is not readily visible. Their feeding method differs from that of the hard ticks in that they do not embed a capitulum in the host, but make an incision through the skin and sip the oozing blood. The feeding lasts up to 30 minutes during which time their body weight may increase as much as tenfold. Sand tampans by their concerted attack in large numbers are able to paralyse and kill sizeable mammals, especially penned livestock, by introducing toxins during feeding, mainly through coxal gland secretions, leading to symptoms similar to those of anaphylactic shock in older animals. These toxins affect the cardiac system, causing Mobitz type atrial-ventricular blocks and ventricular tachycardia. The defensins employed by O. savignyi are being studied for developing multifunctional peptides - shorter peptides derived from the defensin isoform 2 (OsDef2) have useful antibacterial, antioxidant, and cytotoxic properties.

Ornithodoros spp are found worldwide in semi-arid regions, living in burrows, caves, dens, cliffsides, and bird colonies. O. savignyi and O. coriaceus are exceptional in having eyes. O. coriaceus occurs under hillside scrub oak from northern California and Nevada to Mexico, in deer beds under trees and in the lee of large rocks. O. gurneyi favours tree-shaded sand in the deserts of Australia, resting places of kangaroos and people. O. porcinus is found on warthogs, bushpigs and other pig species and occurs throughout Africa in suitable habitats - it plays a role in transmitting the virus causing African swine fever which in 2013 was found 35 km north of Pretoria. A salticid spider, Phidippus rimator, has been recorded from northern California as predating Ornithodoros coriaceus and is only the second predator recorded for this species.

O. savignyi was named after the zoologist Marie Jules César Lelorgne de Savigny, a contemporary of Jean Victoire Audouin's.

Since they are attracted by carbon dioxide, dry ice may be used for their collection, or they may be sifted from the soil. Ornithodoros tampans also fluoresce under ultraviolet light.

== Distribution ==
The extensive distribution of this species from Africa to Asia strongly suggests anthropogenic origins. "Dispersal of the ancestral viruses of AHFV and KFDV may have been accomplished through the movement of animals, including camels presumably carrying ticks, along the Silk Road, which by the 1300s stretched from Europe to China."

== Mating behaviour ==
The coxal secretion of adult female ticks, appearing during and after a blood meal, contains a sex pheromone provoking a mating response from males. Mating occurs off the host, hard ticks doing so on the host animal. Females lay a few hundred eggs in several batches, and may do so for several seasons—adults of Ornithodoros erraticus can live for 15–20 years (Encinas Grandes et al. 1993). There is little seasonal fluctuation in their numbers as their microhabitats are quite stable.

== Chemical and vaccine control ==
Attempted chemical control of tampans by poisoning leads inevitably to their acquiring resistance and immunity to the drugs used. The long-term damage done to the environment by use of such chemicals outweighs any short-term benefits that may accrue. Natural controls in the form of pathogens, predators and parasites are sufficient to curb tampan numbers.

A final possibility for the control of O. erraticus is the use of tick vaccines, the basic principle of which is to stimulate the host immune system to produce a response which damages feeding ticks (Manzano-Román et al. 2012a). This approach has been successful against hard ticks, and two recombinant anti-hard tick vaccines are currently available commercially (de la Fuente et al. 2007, Willadsen 2008). To date, attempts to develop anti-Ornithodoros vaccines have focused on either salivary gland antigens or gut antigens as candidate targets (Manzano-Román et al. 2012a). Although experiments using salivary gland proteins achieved mixed results, an approach using gut antigens was more promising, inducing a protective response in pigs, decreasing female fecundity in 50% and causing up to 80% mortality in nymphs (Manzano-Román et al. 2012a)
