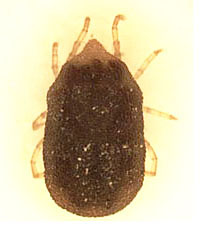

Scientific classification
- Domain: Eukaryota
- Kingdom: Animalia
- Phylum: Arthropoda
- Subphylum: Chelicerata
- Class: Arachnida
- Order: Ixodida
- Family: Argasidae
- Genus: Ornithodoros
- Species: O. hermsi

Binomial name
- Ornithodoros hermsi Wheeler, 1935

= Ornithodoros hermsi =

Species of tick

Ornithodoros hermsi is a species of soft tick. It can be infected with Borrelia hermsii.

== Description ==
Ornithodoros hermsi is a soft-bodied tick of the family Argasidae. It is one of the smallest ticks of the genus Ornithodoros. Females are larger than the males. O. hermsi has a multihost lifecycle, and some females have been observed to live four years without any blood meals. They are parasites of rodents and other small mammals. The most favored host is the western chipmunk, Eutamias spp.

== Lifecycle ==
As do all other species of ticks, O. hermsi begin as eggs, then larvae, then nymphs, to adult ticks. O. hermsi has two larval molts and three nymphal stages. The nymphal blood meals and the greater volume of blood intake will increase the development from nymphs to adults and decrease the number of nymphal stages.

== Distribution ==
O. hermsi is found in the northwestern region of the United States, including Washington, Oregon, California, Idaho, Colorado, and even northern Arizona and New Mexico. Additionally, the species is found in southwest British Columbia, Canada.

The ticks are found in timbered regions and at high altitudes. Wood used for fuel and lumber are common locations, as are hollow pine logs, Douglas firs, and wooden cabins. O. hermsi has been found in the nests of birds and rodents.

== Medical and veterinary importance ==
This species is a vector of Borrelia hermsii, which can cause tick-borne relapsing fever in humans. which are spread from O. hermsi to animals to humans or directly to humans. Unlike hard-bodied ticks, Ixodidae, O. hermsi feeds on a host for a short period ranging from 15 to 20 minutes. They often feed at night. The bites are not painful nor noticeable, which is dangerous as victims of the bite will not know they are affected until symptoms of TBRF appear. The a higher transmission of B. hermsii in late-stage nymphs and adult ticks is because they have larger blood meals, so longer feeding times.
