= Borrelia turicatae =

Scientific classification
- Domain: Bacteria
- Kingdom: Pseudomonadati
- Phylum: Spirochaetota
- Class: Spirochaetia
- Order: Spirochaetales
- Family: Borreliaceae
- Genus: Borrelia
- Species: B. turicatae

Binomial name
- Borrelia turicatae (Brumpt 1933) Steinhaus 1946

Species of bacterium

Borrelia turicatae is a bacterial species of the spirochaete class of the genus Borrelia. It is one of the relapsing fever spirochaetes, which are globally distributed yet understudied agents of tick-borne relapsing fever. The tick vector Ornithodoros turicata transmits B. turicatae, which causes relapsing fever, an arthropod-borne infection of humans and other mammals caused by different Borrelia species. B. turicatae is long and spiral-shaped, as is typical for all spirochaetes. It is a Gram-negative bacterium and visible with light microscopy. Few epidemiological studies have been performed and few molecular data exist for B. turicatae and its arthropod vector O. turicata.

== Distribution ==
Borellia turicatae is predominant in the Southwestern United States. Endemic foci for B. turicatae occur in Texas and Florida, where clinical isolates have been obtained from sick dogs, suggesting a role for wild canids in the maintenance of the spirochaetes in nature. O. turicata has also been reported to be distributed in Mexico and Central and South America, yet given the absence of Latin American isolates for B. turicatae, the identification of endemic foci is unclear.

== Host species ==
Currently, the only known isolates of B. turicatae originate from argasid soft ticks and sick dogs, although the mammalian hosts for most species of relapsing fever spirochaetes include rodents and insectivores. The epidemiological evidence for B. turicatae causing human infections is strong.

== History ==
Borellia turicatae was first described by Émile Brumpt in 1933 and later described by Edward Arthur Steinhaus in his book Insect Microbiology, published in 1946. Its vector O. turicata was first described by Eugenio Dugès in 1876.

== Relapsing fever ==
=== Symptoms ===
Along with fever, patients may experience an incredible range of nonspecific symptoms. The clinical features of relapsing fever may include recurring febrile episodes, chills, nausea, headache, muscle and joint aches, vomiting, lethargy, thrombocytopenia, spirochetemia, anemia, facial paralysis, neutrophilia, lymphopenia, anorexia, dry cough, light sensitivity, rash, neck pain, eye pain, confusion, dizziness, eosinopenia, myocarditis, dermatitis, brain infection, lymphoid hyperplasia, and pregnancy complications. The neurological complications of Borrelia infections are referred to as neuroborreliosis, and the most common manifestations of neuroborreliosis in relapsing fever include meningitis, facial nerve palsy, radiculitis, and encephalopathy. The severity of the disease depends on the infecting serotype. The incubation period typically lasts 7 days, while the symptomatic periods tend to last 3 days, and the afebrile periods tend to last 7 days. Each febrile episode ends with a sequence of symptoms collectively known as a "crisis". During the "chill phase" of the crisis, which lasts 10 to 30 minutes, patients develop very high fever (up to 106.7 °F or 41.5 °C) and may become delirious, agitated, tachycardic, and tachypneic. This phase is followed by the "flush phase", characterized by drenching sweats and a rapid decrease in body temperature and transient hypotension. Generally, patients who are not treated will experience one to four episodes of fever before illness resolves. TBRF contracted during pregnancy can cause spontaneous abortion, premature birth, and neonatal death. The maternal-fetal transmission of Borrelia is believed to occur either transplacentally or while traversing the birth canal. In general, pregnant women have higher spirochaete loads and more severe symptoms than nonpregnant women.

=== Diagnosis ===
The definitive diagnosis of TBRF is based on the observation of Borrelia spirochaetes in smears of peripheral blood, bone marrow, or cerebrospinal fluid in a symptomatic person. B. turicatae is best seen by dark-field microscopy, but the organisms can also be detected using acridine orange or Wright's stain. The organisms are best detected in blood obtained while a person is febrile. With subsequent febrile episodes, the number of circulating spirochaetes decreases, making detecting spirochetes on a peripheral blood smear more difficult. Even during the initial episode, spirochaetes can only be seen 70% of the time.

Especially in resource-poor areas, people continue to be afflicted by undiagnosed febrile illnesses, which pose a significant health burden. However, the ecology, pathogenesis, and distribution of B. turicatae remains understudied, and regions of endemicity not previously known to exist continue to be identified. Because relapsing fever has such nonspecific clinical manifestations, the disease is likely underreported, thus improved diagnostic tools for relapsing fever spirochaetes are needed to better identify the endemic foci and to ensure proper treatment.

A limitation in defining the distribution of B. turicatae has been the absence of diagnostic antigens specific for the species. A spirochaete antigen designated the Borrelia immunogenic protein A (BipA) has been identified in B. turicatae. As antibody responses generated against recombinant BipA appear to be unique to infections caused by B. turicatae, these immune responses generated against BipA suggest that it may be a species-specific antigen that could be used to identify additional vertebrate hosts, define endemic foci for B. turicatae, and increase the awareness of the disease to improve healthcare.

=== Prevention ===
To prevent infection of B. turicatae, an individual should avoid tick exposure. To prevent tick bites, use insect repellent containing DEET on skin or clothing or permethrin on clothing or equipment. Wear clothing that fully covers arms and legs when outdoors. Avoid sleeping in caves in the Southwestern US, where the tick vector O. turicata can be found. Use tweezers to remove a tick by its mouthparts from skin, not by its body. Identification of the tick species may assist in diagnosis, so removed ticks should be kept.

=== Treatment ===
Treatment for relapsing fever can include various antibiotics. TBRF spirochaetes are susceptible to penicillin and other β-Lactam antibiotics, as well as tetracyclines, macrolides, and possibly fluoroquinolones. Although the CDC has not yet developed specific treatment guidelines for TBRF, experts generally recommend tetracycline 500 mg every 6 hours for 10 days as the preferred oral regimen for adults. If tetracyclines are contraindicated, erythromycin, 500 mg (or 12.5 mg/kg) every 6 hours for 10 days is an effective alternative. For patients with central nervous system involvement, parenteral therapy with ceftriaxone 2 g/day for 10–14 days is preferred. All patients treated with antibiotics should be observed during the first 4 hours of treatment for a Jarisch–Herxheimer reaction, which is a worsening of symptoms characterized by rigors, hypotension, and high fever. The reaction occurs in over 50% of cases and may be difficult to distinguish from a febrile crisis. Given appropriate treatment, most patients recover within a few days.

=== Genetics ===
The outcome, including disease severity and tissue tropism, of RF can vary significantly depending on the infecting serotype due to a difference in variable major proteins (VMPs), which include variable small proteins (Vsps) and variable large proteins. B. turicatae has two antigenically distinct isogenic serotypes, Bt1 and Bt2, which differ only in their expressed Vsps, thus in their degree of virulence and tropism, or the location of the infection. Infection with serotype 1 can cause severe vestibular dysfunction and increased morbidity and mortality. Coinfection with serotype 2 reduces the severity of vestibular dysfunction and prevents early mortality. Infection with serotype 2 causes severe arthritis, but coinfection with serotype 1 has little effect on this. This shows that the combination of serotype present during mixed infection significantly influences the manifestations of infection with B. turicatae. Bt2 (20-kDa Vsp2) causes higher spirochetemia and neonatal mortality, as well as severe arthritis, while Bt1 (23-kDa Vsp1) is more neurotropic. Bt1 localizes to the brain in five- to 10-fold higher numbers than Bt2, while Bt2 features five- to 10-fold higher pathogen load in the blood, joints, heart, and skin than Bt1. Additionally, Bt2 causes more severe systemic disease than Bt1, including conjunctivitis, ruffled skin, tibiotarsal arthritis, reduced spontaneous activity, and neonatal mortality. As significant differences exist in the ability of the individual serotypes to enter the brain, and the only difference between the serotypes is their VMPs, expressing certain VMPs (such as Vsp1) may facilitate brain invasion. Additionally, RF borreliae tend to persist in the brain after they disappear from the blood, a phenomenon referred to as residual brain infection.

The ability to mount a specific antibody response is the main determinant of susceptibility to RF. The target of antibody-mediated clearance is the major outer membrane lipoproteins, which are highly variable in sequence and define the serotype. In the RF spirochaete B. turicatae (Bt), these proteins occur in two sizes, variable small proteins (Vsp) around 22 kDa and variable large proteins (Vlp) around 37 kDa. Relapsing fever spirochaetes have a unique process of DNA rearrangement that allows them to periodically change the expression of the VMPs in their outer membrane, which results in the generation of multiple serotypes. This process, called antigenic variation, allows the spirochaete to evade the host's immune response and cause relapsing episodes of fever and other symptoms. Antibodies in the blood that bind to and clear spirochaetes expressing the old VMP do not recognize spirochaetes expressing the new VMP. This results in the characteristic pattern of febrile relapses and remissions.

== The vector ==
The vector, Ornithodoros turicata, is an extremely fast feeder among ticks, requiring a 5- to 60-minute blood meal, and is not likely to be collected from the host, making it difficult to track transmission. O. turicata can be found in caves and ground squirrel or prairie dog burrows in the Plains regions of the Southwest. The ticks emerge at night and feed on the rodent or other mammal as it sleeps. The bites are painless, and most people are unaware they have been bitten. The ticks become infected by feeding on infected wild rodents. Once infected, the ticks remain infected for the rest of their lives, which can be up to 10 years. Individual ticks take many blood meals during each stage of their lifecycle. Although soft ticks prefer to feed on rodents, they may seek out humans if rodents are scarce.
