= Argas walkerae =

Scientific classification
- Kingdom: Animalia
- Phylum: Arthropoda
- Subphylum: Chelicerata
- Class: Arachnida
- Order: Ixodida
- Family: Argasidae
- Genus: Argas
- Species: A. walkerae

Binomial name
- Argas walkerae Kaiser & Hoogstraal, 1969

Species of tick

Argas walkerae Kaiser & Hoogstraal, 1969, as its common name "fowl tampan" reflects, is a soft-bodied argasid tick primarily parasitizing chickens and other domestic fowl. In South Africa its natural range spans the eastern region of Eastern Cape Province from the warmer coastal regions on the Indian Ocean in the south to the cooler mountainous Drakensberg range in the northeast of the Province, with local distribution more strongly associated with the presence of fowls and wooden fowl houses, than climate alone.

The specific epithet honors the scientific contributions of Dr. Jane Brotherton Walker.
