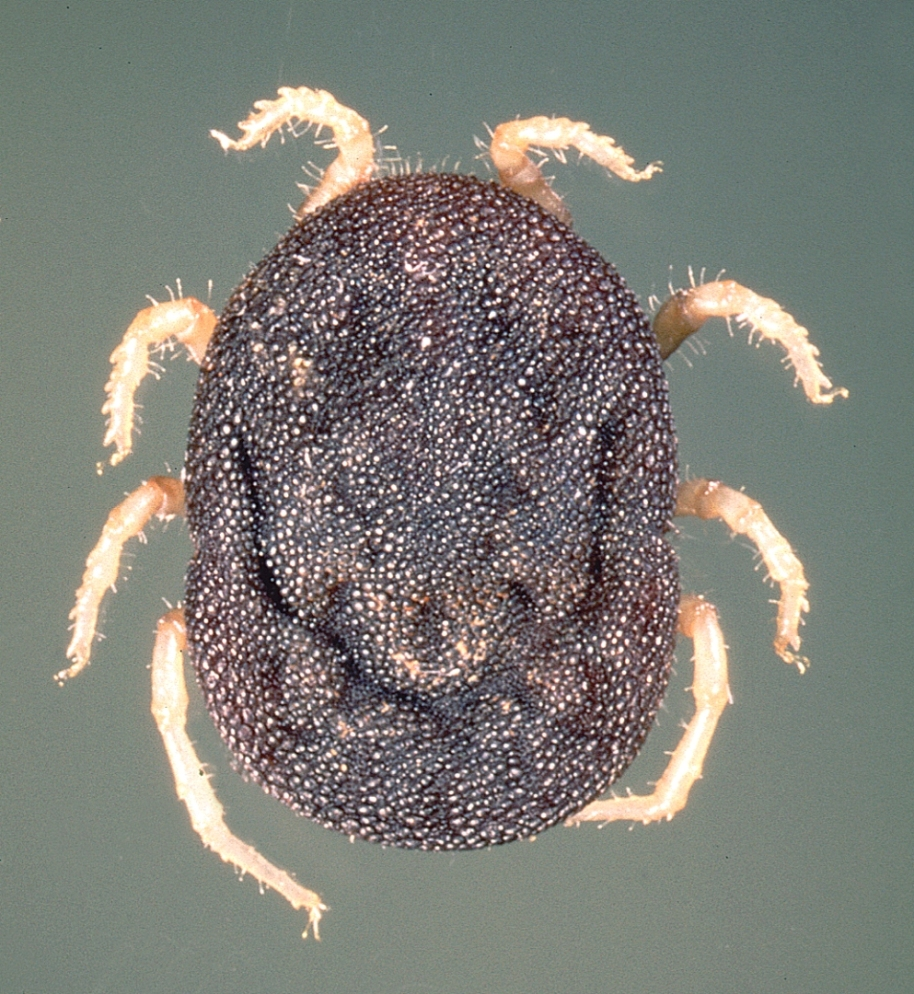
- Ornithodoros savignyi

Scientific classification
- Kingdom: Animalia
- Phylum: Arthropoda
- Subphylum: Chelicerata
- Class: Arachnida
- Order: Ixodida
- Family: Argasidae
- Subfamily: Ornithodorinae
- Genus: Ornithodoros; C. L. Koch, 1837

Type species
- Ornithodoros savignyi Audouin, 1827

Synonyms
- Microargas Hoogstraal & Kohls, 1966; Ornamentum Clifford, Kohls, & Sonenshine, 1964; Pavlovskyella Klompen & Oliver, 1993; Theriodoros Pospelova-Shtrom, 1950

= Ornithodoros =

Ornithodoros Temporal range: Neogene–present

Genus of arachnids

Ornithodoros is a genus in the soft-bodied tick family, Argasidae. It is distinguished from other genera in the family by the absence of a lateral 'suture' line. Ornithodoros ticks are parasitic associates of shelter-seeking vertebrates, such as mammals, birds and reptiles.

Prior to its reclassification in 1844, the genus Ornithodoros was described under the genus Argas.

== Physiology ==
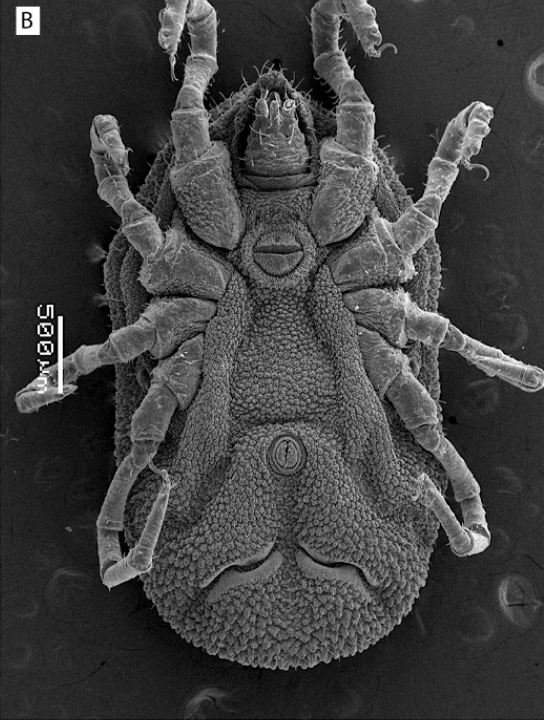
SEM image of ventral view of female Ornithodoros (Pavlovskyella) tartakovskyi

The opening between the midgut and hindgut has been lost, preventing these ticks from excreting digestive waste products from their bodies.

== Habitat ==
The genus Ornithodoros have been documented worldwide, with the highest occurrence in the Paleartic realm.

== Life cycle ==
The life cycle of all species of Ornithodoros is parasitic and relies on one or multiple hosts, most of which are shelter-seeking vertebrates, and can also parasitize humans. Mating and moulting occur in close proximity to sites frequented by the hosts, such as nests. Once a larva hatches, it seeks out a host for its first meal of blood. After feeding for several hours to days, it detaches and molts into a nymph. The nymph will then reattach to a host and repeat the cycle for up to seven instars. Once it reaches adulthood, it continues to feed on the hosts multiple times.

Some Ornithodoros species can reproduce multiple times and may also exhibit autogeny. The life span of some species may extend up to ten years.

== Disease ==
Due to their status as obligate hematophages, Ornithodoros ticks are constantly exposed to blood-borne pathogens. When feeding on a host, small amounts of their saliva may enter the host and transmit infections. Ornithodoros is commonly recognized as a vector for tick-borne relapsing fever. In addition to transmitting bacteria such as Borrelia, it is also responsible for causing relapsing fever. Species of Ornithodoros are also known to transmit the African Swine Fever Virus, which causes African swine fever in pigs or other closely related animals such as wild boars.

== Taxonomy ==
Ornithodoros is one of nine genera in the Argasid subfamily Ornithodorinae. The genus currently contains 48 species over 4 subgenera.

=== Microargas ===
- O. (Microargas) transversus Banks, 1902

=== Ornamentum ===
- O. (Ornamentum) coriaceus Koch, 1844

=== Ornithodoros ===
- O. (Ornithodoros) apertus Walton, 1962
- O. (Ornithodoros) compactus Walton, 1962
- O. (Ornithodoros) eremicus Cooley and Kohls, 1941
- O. (Ornithodoros) huajianensis Sun, Xu, Liu & Wu, 2019
- O. (Ornithodoros) indica Rau and Rao, 1971
- O. (Ornithodoros) kalahariensis Bakkes, de Klerk and Mans, 2018
- O. (Ornithodoros) moubata (Murray, 1877)
- O. (Ornithodoros) noorsveldensis Bakkes, de Klerk and Mans, 2018
- O. (Ornithodoros) pavimentosus Neumann, 1901
- O. (Ornithodoros) phacochoerus Bakkes, de Klerk and Mans, 2018
- O. (Ornithodoros) porcinus Walton, 1962
- O. (Ornithodoros) procaviae Theodor and Costa, 1960
- O. (Ornithodoros) savignyi (Audouin, 1826)
- O. (Ornithodoros) waterbergensis Bakkes, de Klerk and Mans, 2018

=== Pavlovskyella ===
- O. (Pavlovskyella) alactagalis Issaakjan, 1936
- O. (Pavlovskyella) arenicolous Hoogstraal, 1953
- O. (Pavlovskyella) asperus Warburton, 1918
- O. (Pavlovskyella) brasiliensis Aragão, 1923
- O. (Pavlovskyella) cholodkovskyi Pavlovsky, 1930
- O. (Pavlovskyella) cooleyi McIvor, 1941
- O. (Pavlovskyella) costalis Diatta, Bouattour, Durand, Renaud and Trape, 2013
- O. (Pavlovskyella) erraticus (Lucas, 1849)
- O. (Pavlovskyella) furcosus Neumann, 1908
- O. (Pavlovskyella) graingeri Heisch and Guggisberg, 1953
- O. (Pavlovskyella) grenieri Klein, 1965
- O. (Pavlovskyella) hermsi Wheeler, Herms and Meyer, 1935
- O. (Pavlovskyella) kairouanensis Trape, Diatta, Bouattour, Durand and Renaud, 2013
- O. (Pavlovskyella) marocanus Velu, 1919
- O. (Pavlovskyella) merionesi Trape, Diatta, Belghyti, Sarih, Durand and Renaud, 2013
- O. (Pavlovskyella) nattereri Warburton, 1927
- O. (Pavlovskyella) nicollei Mooser, 1932
- O. (Pavlovskyella) normandi Larrousse, 1923
- O. (Pavlovskyella) occidentalis Trape, Diatta, Durand and Renaud, 2013
- O. (Pavlovskyella) papillipes (Birula, 1895)
- O. (Pavlovskyella) parkeri Cooley, 1936
- O. (Pavlovskyella) rostratus Aragão, 1911
- O. (Pavlovskyella) rupestris Trape, Bitam, Renaud and Durand, 2013
- O. (Pavlovskyella) sonrai Sautet and Witkowski, 1943
- O. (Pavlovskyella) sparnus Kohls and Clifford, 1963
- O. (Pavlovskyella) tartakovskyi Olenev, 1931
- O. (Pavlovskyella) tholozani (Laboulbène and Mégnin, 1882)
- O. (Pavlovskyella) turicata (Dugès, 1876)
- O. (Pavlovskyella) verrucosus Olenev, Zasukhin and Fenyuk, 1934
- O. (Pavlovskyella) zumpti Heisch and Guggisberg, 1953

Else, for O. (Pavlovskyella) macmillani Hoogstraal and Kohls, 1966 see Apanaskevichiella. For O. (Pavlovskyella) gurneyi Warburton, 1926 see Australpavlovskyella
