= List of parasites of the marsh rice rat =

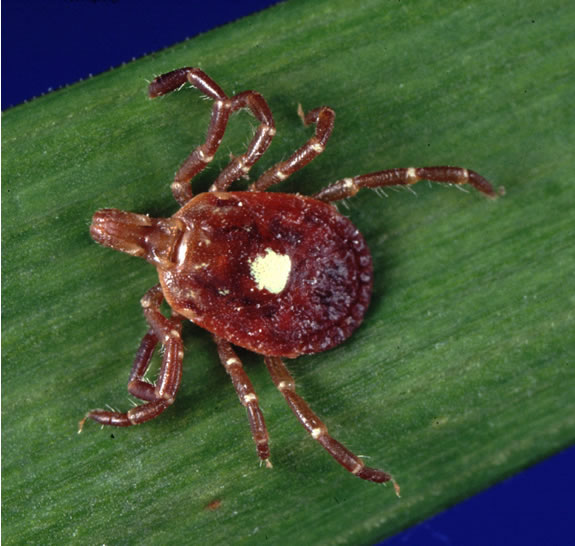
The lone star tick is one of the parasites that the marsh rice rat shares with other mammals.

A variety of parasites have been recorded from the marsh rice rat (Oryzomys palustris), a semiaquatic rodent found in the eastern and southern United States, north to New Jersey and Kansas and south to Florida and Texas, and in Tamaulipas, far northeastern Mexico. Some of these parasites are endoparasites, internal parasites, while others are ectoparasites, external parasites.

Parasitologist John Kinsella compared the endoparasites of marsh rice rats in a saltwater marsh at Cedar Key and a freshwater marsh at Paynes Prairie, both in Florida, in a 1988 study. He found a total of 45 species, a number unequaled in rodents. This may be related to the diverse habitats the rice rat uses and to its omnivorous diet; it eats a variety of animals which may serve as intermediate hosts of various parasites. The endoparasites in the saltwater marsh were dominated by trematodes (flukes), and those of the freshwater marsh by nematodes (roundworms). Endoparasites were found in the gastric mucosa (which lines the stomach), the cavity of the stomach, the small intestine, the cecum, the large intestine, the pancreatic duct, the bile ducts, the mucus of the liver, the pulmonary arteries, the abdominal cavity, and the pleural cavity. While the marsh rice rat harbors a number of host-specific species, such as the nematode Aonchotheca forresteri, other parasite species, such as the lone star tick (pictured), are shared with other mammals. Compared to the hispid cotton rat (Sigmodon hispidus), Florida marsh rice rats usually harbor fewer individual ectoparasites of each species. Borrelia, the bacterium that causes Lyme disease, has been identified in some ticks that infect the marsh rice rat and it has been identified as a possible natural reservoir for Borrelia.

== Key ==
Name	The scientific name of the parasite species. A note is given where a species has been recorded on the marsh rice rat under different scientific names. Unnamed species are indicated with "sp." and parasites that could not be identified to species level are indicated with "unidentified".
Geographic occurrence	U.S. states where the parasite has been recorded on the marsh rice rat (no parasite records are available from the Mexican distribution of the marsh rice rat). This information is unavailable for some parasites.
Prevalence	Prevalence of infection with the parasite in a studied marsh rice rat population. The prevalence is given either as a percentage (e.g., 10%) or as a fraction (e.g., 5/50, meaning that 5 out of 50 examined animals were infected with the parasite), together with the site of study. Prevalence figures are unavailable for some parasites.
Present on other species?	"Yes" indicates that the parasite has also been recorded on other host species, "no" that it is (as far as known) specific to the marsh rice rat. For some unnamed species, the sources do not indicate whether or not the species is specific to the marsh rice rat.

== Ectoparasites ==
=== Acari ===
The Acari include the mites and ticks. Many are parasites of other animals. One study in South Carolina failed to find ticks on marsh rice rats living in marshes, which are an unsuitable habitat for the parasites.

Name	Geographic occurrence	Prevalence	Present on other species?
Amblyomma americanum	Georgia	–	Yes
Amblyomma maculatum	South Carolina	–	Yes
Androlaelaps casalis	–	–	Yes
Androlaelaps fahrenholzi (Note: Previously reported as Haemolaelaps glasgowi, but that name is a synonym of Androlaelaps fahrenholzi.)	Florida; Georgia	50% (Everglades, Florida); 60% (Hillsborough Co., Florida); 3/29 (southwestern Georgia)	Yes
Dermacentor variabilis	Florida; Georgia; Missouri; South Carolina; Tennessee	47% (Everglades); 65% (Hillsborough Co.); 12/29 (southwestern Georgia); 21% (Chester Co., South Carolina)	Yes, but marsh rice rat is among most important hosts
Euschoengastia peromysci	Georgia	–	Yes
Euschoengastia setosa	Georgia	–	No
Euschoengastia sp.	Georgia	–	No
Eutrombicula batatas	Florida	–	No
Eutrombicula splendens	Florida; Georgia	95% (Hillsborough Co.); 1/29 (southwestern Georgia)	Yes
Gigantolaelaps mattogrossensis (Note: The Gigantolaelaps mite from the marsh rice rat was first described as Gigantolaelaps cricetidarum, a separate species, but later considered identical with G. mattogrossensis; some still consider the two to be different species.)	Florida; Georgia; Texas	35% (Everglades); 14/29 (southwestern Georgia)	Yes, but in the United States occurs mainly in rice rats
Haemogamasus, unidentified species	Georgia	–	–
Ixodes affinis	Georgia	–	Yes
Ixodes brunneus	Georgia	–	Yes
Ixodes cookei	Virginia	–	Yes
Ixodes minor	South Carolina	–	Yes
Ixodes scapularis	Georgia; North Carolina; South Carolina; Virginia	30% (Outer Banks, North Carolina)	Yes
Ixodes texanus	Georgia	–	Yes
Ixodes, unidentified species	Florida	–	–
Laelaps manguinhosi (Note: Laelaps oryzomydis is a synonym.)	Florida; South Carolina; Texas	–	None north of Mexico
Laelaps sp.	Florida; Georgia	50% (Everglades); 10% (Hillsborough Co.); 4/29 (southwestern Georgia)	Yes, but occurs mainly in rice rats
Listrophoridae, unidentified species	Florida; Georgia	–	–
Listrophorus, unidentified species	Georgia	8/29 (southwestern Georgia)	–
Ornithonyssus bacoti (Note: Previously known as Bdellonyssus bacoti, but since reassigned to Ornithonyssus.)	Florida; Georgia	20% (Everglades); 50% (Hillsborough Co.); 11/29 (southwestern Georgia)	Yes
Ornithonyssus sp. (Note: Originally assigned to Bdellonyssus (spelled Bdelonyssus), but that name is a synonym of Ornithonyssus.)	Georgia	1/29 (southwestern Georgia)	Yes
Oryzomysia oryzomys (Note: Previously reported as Chilodiscoides oryzomys, but now assigned to Oryzomysia.)	Georgia	–	No
Prolistrophorus bakeri (Note: Previously known as Listrophorus bakeri, but since assigned to the genus Prolistrophorus.)	–	–	Yes
Prolistrophorus grassii (Note: Previously known as Listrophorus bakeri, but since assigned to the genus Prolistrophorus.)	Georgia	–	Yes
Radfordia palustris	Florida; Georgia; South Carolina	–	No

=== Anoplura ===
Sucking lice (Anoplura) are a diverse group infecting placental mammals. Species found on marsh rice rats include three of the common genus Hoplopleura and Polyplax spinulosa, which more usually infects black and brown rats.

Name	Geographic occurrence	Prevalence	Present in other species?
Hoplopleura hirsuta	Georgia	1/29 (southwestern Georgia)	Yes; usually occurs in cotton rats
Hoplopleura oryzomydis (Note: Listed as Hoplopleura quadridentata by Worth (1950), but later described as a separate species, Hoplopleura oryzomydis.)	Delaware; Florida; Georgia; Louisiana; South Carolina; Tennessee; Texas	18% (Everglades); 35% (Hillsborough Co.); 1/21 (Shelby County, Tennessee)	Yes
Polyplax spinulosa	Georgia; Tennessee	2/29 (southwestern Georgia)	Yes; normally infects Rattus

=== Siphonaptera ===
Fleas (Siphonaptera) are common parasites of vertebrates, mainly mammals. Several species of fleas have been found on the marsh rice rat.

Name	Geographic occurrence	Prevalence	Present in other species?
Ctenocephalides felis	Georgia	–	Yes
Ctenophthalmus pseudagyrtes	Missouri; Tennessee	2/21 (Shelby Co., Tennessee)	Yes
Epitedia wenmanni	Missouri	–	Yes
Polygenis gwyni	Florida; Georgia; Mississippi; South Carolina	4/29 (southwestern Georgia); 33% (Marion Co., Mississippi)	Yes; mainly found on the hispid cotton rat
Stenoponia americana	South Carolina; Tennessee	1/39 (Shelby Co.)	Yes

== Endoparasites ==
Unless otherwise specified, all information in this section is from Kinsella (1988, table 1).

=== Nematoda ===
Nematodes are among the largest animal phyla and include at least 12,000 known species that are parasites of vertebrates. In Kinsella's 1988 study in Florida, species diversity was higher in the saltwater marsh (Cedar Key) than the freshwater marsh (Paynes Prairie), but nematodes at Paynes Prairie occurred more commonly and made up the bulk of the parasites found in rice rats there.

Name	Geographic occurrence	Prevalence	Present in other species?
Aonchotheca forresteri (Note: Originally placed in the genus Capillaria, but later reassigned to Aonchotheca.)	Florida	46% (Paynes Prairie, Florida); 1% (Cedar Key, Florida)	No
Capillaria gastrica	Florida	4% (Paynes Prairie, Florida); 6% (Cedar Key, Florida)	Yes
Capillaria hepatica	Florida	8% (Paynes Prairie, Florida); 6% (Cedar Key, Florida)	Yes
Hassalstrongylus forresteri	Florida	92% (Paynes Prairie, Florida); 9% (Cedar Key, Florida) (Note: Because females of these three species cannot be distinguished, data were combined.)	No
Hassalstrongylus lichtenfelsi	Florida	92% (Paynes Prairie, Florida); 9% (Cedar Key, Florida)	No
Hassalstrongylus musculi	Florida	92% (Paynes Prairie, Florida); 9% (Cedar Key, Florida)	Yes
Litomosoides scotti	Florida	57% (Cedar Key, Florida)	No
Mastophorus muris	Georgia; Florida	36% (Paynes Prairie, Florida); 1% (Cedar Key, Florida)	Yes
Monodontus sp.	Florida	1% (Cedar Key, Florida)	–
Parastrongylus schmidti (Note: Originally named Angiostrongylus schmidti by Kinsella (1971), but moved to Parastrongylus by Ubelaker (1986).)	Florida	7% (Paynes Prairie, Florida); 3% (Cedar Key, Florida)	Not in the wild, but is able to infect other rodents in experiments
Pterygodermatites ondatrae	Florida	20% (Paynes Prairie, Florida); 5% (Cedar Key, Florida) (Note: Females of these two species cannot be distinguished, so data were combined.)	Yes
Pterygodermatites sp.	Florida	20% (Paynes Prairie, Florida); 5% (Cedar Key, Florida)	–
Physaloptera hispida	Florida	35% (Paynes Prairie, Florida)	Yes
Physaloptera sp.	Florida	4% (Cedar Key, Florida)	–
Skrjabinoclava kinsellai (Note: Listed as Skrjabinoclava thapari by Kinsella (1988), but later described as a separate species.)	Florida	28% (Cedar Key, Florida)	No
Spiruridae, unidentified larvae	Florida	5% (Cedar Key, Florida)	–
Strongyloides sp.	Florida	30% (Paynes Prairie, Florida)	–
Syphacia oryzomyos	Florida	42% (Paynes Prairie, Florida)	No
Trichostrongylus affinis	Florida	14% (Paynes Prairie, Florida); 6% (Cedar Key, Florida)	Yes
Trichostrongylus sigmodontis	Florida	8% (Paynes Prairie, Florida); 3% (Cedar Key, Florida)	Yes

=== Cestoda ===
Four tapeworms are known from the marsh rice rat, all in Florida, but three of those are usually found in other species and only rarely in the rice rat.

Name	Geographic occurrence	Prevalence	Present in other species?
Hymenolepis diminuta	Florida	19% (Paynes Prairie, Florida); 1% (Cedar Key, Florida)	Yes
Taenia rileyi	Florida	1% (Cedar Key, Florida)	Yes; usually infects bobcats
Taenia mustelae	Florida	0.5% (Paynes Prairie, Florida)	Yes; usually infects skunks and mustelids
Cladotaenia circi	Florida	0.5% (Paynes Prairie, Florida); 1% (Cedar Key, Florida)	Yes; usually infects hawks

=== Digenea ===
Flukes (Trematoda) from the subclass Digenea are common parasites of small mammals with complex life cycles. In his 1988 study, Kinsella found an unprecedented 21 species of trematodes in Florida marsh rice rats. The intermediate hosts of these trematodes include a variety of invertebrates, fish, and amphibians, which are eaten by the marsh rice rat. Trematodes were generally more common at the Cedar Key saltwater marsh than at the freshwater marsh in Paynes Prairie.

Name	Geographic occurrence	Prevalence	Present in other species?
Acanthotrema cursitans (Note: Listed as Stictodora cursitans by Kinsella (1988), but moved to Acantothrema in 2003.)	Florida	52% (Cedar Key, Florida)	Yes
Ascocotyle angrense	Florida	25% (Cedar Key, Florida)	Yes; occurs mainly in birds
Ascocotyle pindoramensis (Note: Listed as Ascocotyle mollienisicola by Kinsella (1988), but that name is a synonym of A. pindoramensis.)	Florida	9% (Cedar Key, Florida)	Yes; occurs mainly in birds
Brachylaima virginianum (Note: Spelled Brachylaeme by Kinsella (1988).)	Florida	15% (Paynes Prairie, Florida)	Yes; occurs mainly in the Virginia opossum
Catatropis johnstoni	Florida	30% (Cedar Key, Florida)	No other natural definitive host known, but occurs outside the range of the marsh rice rat and the normal host may be a bird
Echinochasmus schwartzi	Florida	19% (Cedar Key, Florida)	Yes
Fibricola lucida	Florida	67% (Paynes Prairie, Florida); 11% (Cedar Key, Florida)	Yes
Gymnophalloides heardi (Note: Reported as Parvatrema sp. by Kinsella (1988), but later described as Gymnophalloides heardi.)	Florida	26% (Cedar Key, Florida)	No
Gynaecotyla adunca	Florida	15% (Cedar Key, Florida)	Yes; normally infects birds
Levinseniella deblocki (Note: Reported as Levinseniella sp. by Kinsella (1988), and described as L. deblocki in 1995.)	Florida	49% (Cedar Key, Florida)	Yes
Lyperosomum intermedium	Florida	45% (Cedar Key, Florida)	No
Maritrema heardi (Note: Reported as Maritrema sp. II by Kinsella (1988), then described as the only member of its own genus, Floridatrema heardi, and later again assigned to the genus Maritrema.)	Florida	19% (Cedar Key, Florida)	No
Maritrema prosthometra (Note: This species was called prosthrometra by Kinsella (1988); the correct spelling is prosthometra.)	Florida	5% (Cedar Key, Florida)	Yes
Maritrema sp. I	Florida	69% (Cedar Key, Florida)	Yes
Microphallus basodactylophallus	Florida	94% (Cedar Key, Florida)	Yes
Microphallus nicolli	Florida	9% (Cedar Key, Florida)	Yes
Microphallus sp.	Florida	10% (Cedar Key, Florida)	Yes
Notocotylus fosteri	Florida	3/4 (Cedar Key, Florida)	No
Odhneria odhneri	Florida	6% (Cedar Key, Florida)	Yes
Probolocoryphe glandulosa	Florida	56% (Cedar Key, Florida)	Yes
Urotrema scabridum	Florida	23% (Cedar Key, Florida)	Yes
Zonorchis komareki	Florida	1% (Cedar Key, Florida)	Yes

=== Pentastomida ===
Pentastomida is an enigmatic group of parasites that may be related to maxillopod crustaceans. One species, Porocephalus crotali, is known from the marsh rice rat. It infects various mammals in the southeastern United States, which serve as intermediate hosts; snakes which eat those mammals are the definitive hosts.

Name	Geographic occurrence	Prevalence	Present in other species?
Porocephalus crotali	Florida; South Carolina	12/105 (Levy County, Florida); 3/17 (Bear Island, South Carolina)	Yes

=== Apicomplexa ===
Apicomplexa is a major group of unicellular eukaryotes that encompasses several important parasites, including the malaria parasite Plasmodium. Three species are known from the marsh rice rat, all of which belong to the Eimerina clade. Two are in the genus Eimeria, members of which cause the economically significant disease coccidiosis in poultry. The third is a member of Isospora, which includes species that are pathogenic in humans and pigs.

Name	Geographic occurrence	Prevalence	Present in other species?
Eimeria kinsellai	Florida	–	No
Eimeria palustris	Alabama	7/19 (Tuskegee National Forest, Alabama)	No
Isospora hammondi	Alabama	3/19 (Tuskegee National Forest, Alabama)	No

== Literature cited ==
- Anderson, R. C.; Wong, P. L. (1994). "Skrjabinoclava kinsellai n. sp. (Nematoda: Acuarioidea) from the rice rat Oryzomys palustris in Florida". Systematic Parasitology. 28: 1–4. doi:10.1007/BF00006904. S2CID 38223917.
- Barnard, William P.; Ernst, John V.; Roper, Richard A. (1971). "Eimeria kinsellaisp. N. (Protozoa: Eimeriidae) in a Marsh Rice Rat Oryzomys palustrisfrom Florida". The Journal of Protozoology. 18 (3): 546–547. doi:10.1111/j.1550-7408.1971.tb03370.x. PMID 5167229.
- Barnard, William P.; Ernst, John V.; Stevens, Robert O. (1971). "Eimeria palustris sp. n. And Isospora hammondi sp. n. (Coccidia: Eimeriidae) from the Marsh Rice Rat, Oryzomys palustris (Harlan)". The Journal of Parasitology. 57 (6): 1293–1296. doi:10.2307/3277983. JSTOR 3277983. PMID 5003273.
- Beck, Hans-Peter; Blake, Damer; Dardé, Marie-Laure; Felger, Ingrid; Pedraza-Díaz, Susana; Regidor-Cerrillo, Javier; Gómez-Bautista, Mercedes; Ortega-Mora, Luis Miguel; Putignani, Lorenza; Shiels, Brian; Tait, Andrew; Weir, Willie (2009). "Molecular approaches to diversity of populations of apicomplexan parasites". International Journal for Parasitology. 39 (2): 175–189. doi:10.1016/j.ijpara.2008.10.001. PMID 18983997.
- Borror, Donald J., and White, Richard E. 1970. A Field Guide to the Insects. Boston: Houghton Mifflin.
- Brookins, M. D.; Wellehan, J. F. X.; Roberts, J. F.; Allison, K.; Curran, S. S.; Childress, A. L.; Greiner, E. C. (2009). "Massive Visceral Pentastomiasis Caused by Porocephalus crotaliin a Dog". Veterinary Pathology. 46 (3): 460–463. doi:10.1354/vp.07-VP-0246-R-BC. PMID 19176495. S2CID 8415324.
- Bush, Albert O.; Kinsella, John M. (1972). "A Natural Definitive Host for Catatropis johnstoni Martin, 1956 (Trematoda: Notocotylidae), with Notes on Experimental Host Specificity and Intraspecific Variation". The Journal of Parasitology. 58 (4): 843–845. doi:10.2307/3278335. JSTOR 3278335. PMID 5057245.
- Carmichael, Joseph A.; Strauss, Richard E.; McIntyre, Nancy E. (2007). "Seasonal Variation of North American Form of Gigantolaelaps mattogrossensis (Acari: Laelapidae) on Marsh Rice Rat in Southern Coastal Texas". Journal of Medical Entomology. 44 (1): 80–84. doi:10.1603/0022-2585(2007)44[80:SVONAF]2.0.CO;2. ISSN 0022-2585. PMID 17294924. S2CID 15349741.
- Ching, Hilda Lei (1995). "Four New Gymnophallid Digeneans from Rice Rats, Willets, and Molluscs in Florida". The Journal of Parasitology. 81 (6): 924–928. doi:10.2307/3284042. JSTOR 3284042. PMID 8544066.
- Clark, Kerry L.; Durden, Lance A. (2002). "Parasitic Arthropods of Small Mammals in Mississippi". Journal of Mammalogy. 83 (4): 1039–1048. doi:10.1644/1545-1542(2002)083<1039:PAOSMI>2.0.CO;2. ISSN 1545-1542.
- Clark, Kerry L.; Oliver Jr, James H.; Grego, John M.; James, Angela M.; Durden, Lance A.; Banks, Craig W. (2001). "Host Associations of Ticks Parasitizing Rodents Atborrelia Burgdorferienzootic Sites in South Carolina". Journal of Parasitology. 87 (6): 1379–1386. doi:10.1645/0022-3395(2001)087[1379:HAOTPR]2.0.CO;2. ISSN 0022-3395. PMID 11780825. S2CID 25871482.
- Deblock, S.; Heard, R. W. (1969). "Contribution à l'étude des Microphallidae. Travassos, 1920 (Trematoda). XIX - Description de Maritrema prosthometra n. sp. Et De longiductotrema nov. gen. Parasites d'Oiseaux Ralliformes d'Amérique du Nord". Annales de Parasitologie Humaine et Comparée. 44 (4): 415–424. doi:10.1051/parasite/1969444415. PMID 5393009.
- Denton, J. Fred; Kinsella, John M. (1972). "Lyperosomum intermedium sp. n. (Digenea: Dicrocoeliidae) from the Rice Rat, Oryzomys palustris, from Southeastern Salt Marshes". The Journal of Parasitology. 58 (2): 226–228. doi:10.2307/3278074. JSTOR 3278074. PMID 5022855.
- Diaw, O.T. 1976. Contribution a l'etude de nematodes Trichostrongyloidea parasites de xenarthre, marsupiaux et rongeurs neotropicaux. Bulletin de la Muséum National de la Histoire Naturel de Paris (Zoologie) 282:1065-1089.
- Ditrich, Oleg; Scholz, Tomáš; Vargas-Vázquez, Joaquín (1996). "Life-cycle of Echinochasmus macrocaudatus n. Sp. (Trematoda: Echinostomatidae)". Systematic Parasitology. 33 (3): 225–235. doi:10.1007/BF01531204. S2CID 20629195.
- Doran, David J. (1955). "A Catalogue of the Protozoa and Helminths of North American Rodents. III. Nematoda". American Midland Naturalist. 53 (1): 162–175. doi:10.2307/2422306. JSTOR 2422306.
- Durden, Lance A. (1988). "The Spiny Rat Louse, Polyplax spinulosa, as a Parasite of the Rice Rat, Oryzomys palustris, in North America". The Journal of Parasitology. 74 (5): 900–901. doi:10.2307/3282280. JSTOR 3282280. PMID 3047354.
- Durden, L.A. and Kollars, T.M. Jr. 1997. The fleas (Siphonaptera) of Tennessee. Journal of Vector Ecology 22(1):13-22.
- Durden, L.A. and Musser, G.G. 1994. The sucking lice (Insecta, Anoplura) of the world: a taxonomic checklist with records of mammalian hosts and geographical distributions. Bulletin of the American Museum of Natural History 218:1-90.
- Durden, L.A., Kollars, T.M. Jr., Patton, S. and Gerhardt, R.R. 1997. Sucking lice (Anoplura) of mammals of Tennessee. Journal of Vector Ecology 22(1):71-76.
- Durden, L.A., Wills, W. and Clark, K.L. 1999. The fleas (Siphonaptera) of South Carolina with an assessment of their vectorial importance. Journal of Vector Ecology 24(2):171-181.
- Feliu, Carlos; Torres, Jordi; Miquel, Jordi; Segovia, Juan Matías; Fons, Roger (2006). "Digenean trematodes". Micromammals and Macroparasites. pp. 13–23. doi:10.1007/978-4-431-36025-4_2. ISBN 978-4-431-36024-7.
- Forrester, D.J. 1992. Parasites and diseases of wild mammals in Florida. University of Press of Florida, 459 pp. ISBN 978-0-8130-1072-4
- Forrester, Donald J.; Kinsella, John M. (1973). "Comparative morphology and ecology of two species of Litomosoides (Nematoda: Filarioidea) of rodents in Florida, with a key to the species of Litomosoides Chandler, 1931". International Journal for Parasitology. 3 (2): 255–263. doi:10.1016/0020-7519(73)90031-3. PMID 4706574.
- Forrester, Donald J.; Shealy, Robert M.; Best, Stephen H. (1970). "Porocephalus crotali (Pentastomida) in South Carolina". The Journal of Parasitology. 56 (5): 977. doi:10.2307/3277517. JSTOR 3277517.
- Foster, Garry W.; Cunningham, Mark W.; Kinsella, John M.; Forrester, Donald J. (2004). "Parasitic Helminths of Black Bear Cubs (Ursus americanus) from Florida". Journal of Parasitology. 90 (1): 173–175. doi:10.1645/GE-127R. PMID 15040687. S2CID 35600104.
- Goldberg, Stephen R.; Bursey, Charles R.; Cheam, Hay (1998). "Helminths of Six Species of Anolis Lizards (Polychrotidae) from Hispaniola, West Indies". The Journal of Parasitology. 84 (6): 1291–1295. doi:10.2307/3284695. JSTOR 3284695. PMID 9920335.
- Heard, Richard W.; Kinsella, John M. (1995). "Levinseniella deblocki, New Species (Trematoda: Digenea: Microphallidae) from Salt Marshes along the Eastern Gulf of Mexico with Notes on Its Functional Morphology and Life History". Gulf Research Reports. 9. doi:10.18785/grr.0902.03.
- Kinsella, John M. (1971). "Angiostrongylus schmidti sp. n. (Nematoda: Metastrongyloidea) from the Rice Rat, Oryzomys palustris, in Florida, with a Key to the Species of Angiostrongylus Kamensky, 1905". The Journal of Parasitology. 57 (3): 494–497. doi:10.2307/3277901. JSTOR 3277901. PMID 5104560.
- Kinsella, J.M. 1974. Comparison of helminth parasites of the cotton rat, Sigmodon hispidus, from several habitats in Florida. American Museum Novitates 2540:1-12.
- Kinsella, J.M. 1988. Comparison of helminths of rice rats, Oryzomys palustris, from freshwater and saltwater marshes in Florida. Proceedings of the Helminthological Society of Washington 55(2):275-280.
- Kinsella, J.M; Deblock, S. (1994). "Contribution à l'étude des microphallidae travassos, 1920 (Trematoda)". Parasite. 1 (1): 45–50. doi:10.1051/parasite/1994011045. PMID 9235193.
- Kinsella, J. M.; Heard, Richard W. (1974). "Morphology and Life Cycle of Stictodora cursitans n. Comb. (Trematoda: Heterophyidae) from Mammals in Florida Salt Marshes". Transactions of the American Microscopical Society. 93 (3): 408–412. doi:10.2307/3225444. JSTOR 3225444. PMID 4853269.
- Kinsella, J. M.; Pence, Danny B. (1987). "Description of Capillaria forresteri sp.n. (Nematoda: Trichuridae) from the rice rat Oryzomys palustris in Florida, with notes on its ecology and seasonal variation". Canadian Journal of Zoology. 65 (5): 1294–1297. Bibcode:1987CaJZ...65.1294K. doi:10.1139/z87-205.
- Kinsella, J.M. and Tkach, V.V. 2005. Notocotylus fosteri sp. nov. (Trematoda, Notocotylidae) from the rice rat, Oryzomys palustris in Florida. Acta Parasitologica 50(3):194-198.
- Kollars, Thomas M. (1996). "Interspecific Differences between Small Mammals as Hosts of Immature Dermacentor variabilis (Acari: Ixodidae) and a Model for Detection of High Risk Areas of Rocky Mountain Spotted Fever". The Journal of Parasitology. 82 (5): 707–710. doi:10.2307/3283879. JSTOR 3283879. PMID 8885876.
- Kollars, T.M. Jr., Durden, L.A. and Oliver, J.H. Jr. 1997. Fleas and lice parasitizing mammals in Missouri. Journal of Vector Ecology 22(2):125-132.
- Kollars Jr, Thomas M.; Oliver Jr, J. H.; Masters, E. J.; Kollars, P. G.; Durden, L. A. (2000). "Host utilization and seasonal occurrence of Dermacentor species (Acari:Ixodidae) in Missouri, USA". Experimental and Applied Acarology. 24 (8): 631–643. doi:10.1023/A:1026566301325. PMID 11201355. S2CID 44225583.
- Kontrimavichus, V.L. 1985. Helminths of mustelids and trends in their evolution. Amerind Publishing Company, 607 pp.
- Layne, James N. (1971). "Fleas (Siphonaptera) of Florida". The Florida Entomologist. 54 (1): 35–51. doi:10.2307/3493787. JSTOR 3493787.
- Levin, M., Levine, J.F., Norris, D.E., Howard, P., Yang, S. and Apperson, C.S. 1993. Reservoir competence of rice rat and lizards for the Lyme disease spirochete, Borrelia burgdorferi. Pp. 11–13 in Apperson, C.S., Levine, J.F. and Snoddy, E.L. (eds.). Proceedings of the 2nd Workshop on Lyme Disease in the Southeast. Raleigh: North Carolina State University.
- Levine, Jay F.; Sonenshine, Daniel E.; Nicholson, William L.; Turner, R. T. (1991). "Borrelia burgdorferi in Ticks (Acari: Ixodidae) from Coastal Virginia". Journal of Medical Entomology. 28 (5): 668–674. doi:10.1093/jmedent/28.5.668. PMID 1941936.
- Levine, J.F., Apperson, C.S., Strider, J.B. Jr., Levin, M., Ryan, J.R., Howard, P., Coughlin, W., Knight, M. and Yang, S. 1993. Ticks, their hosts, and Borrelia burgdorferi on the outer banks of North Carolina. Pp. 7–8 in Apperson, C.S., Levine, J.F. and Snoddy, E.L. (eds.). Proceedings of the 2nd Workshop on Lyme Disease in the Southeast. Raleigh: North Carolina State University.
- Lindsay, D. S.; Dubey, J. P.; Blagburn, B. L. (1997). "Biology of Isospora SPP. From humans, nonhuman primates, and domestic animals". Clinical Microbiology Reviews. 10 (1): 19–34. doi:10.1128/CMR.10.1.19. PMC 172913. PMID 8993857.
- Martin, J.W. and Davis, G.E. 2001. An updated classification of the Recent Crustacea. Natural History Museum of Los Angeles County, Science Series 39:1-124.
- Mayer, KA; Dailey, MD; Miller, MA (2003). "Helminth parasites of the southern sea otter Enhydra lutris nereis in central California: Abundance, distribution and pathology". Diseases of Aquatic Organisms. 53 (1): 77–88. doi:10.3354/dao053077. PMID 12608572.
- McKeever, Sturgis (1971). "Zonorchis komareki (Mc Intosh, 1939) (Trematoda: Dicrocoeliidae) from Reithrodontomys humulis (Audubon and Bachman)". The Journal of Parasitology. 57 (4): 865. doi:10.2307/3277816. JSTOR 3277816.
- Meagher, Shawn (1999). "Genetic Diversity Andcapillaria Hepatica(Nematoda) Prevalence in Michigan Deer Mouse Populations". Evolution. 53 (4): 1318–1324. Bibcode:1999Evolu..53.1318M. doi:10.1111/j.1558-5646.1999.tb04547.x. hdl:2027.42/137238. PMID 28565518. S2CID 21285862.
- Medvedev, Sergei G.; Krasnov, Boris R. (2006). "Fleas: Permanent satellites of small mammals". Micromammals and Macroparasites. pp. 161–177. doi:10.1007/978-4-431-36025-4_10. ISBN 978-4-431-36024-7.
- Morand, Serge; Bouamer, Salah; Hugot, Jean-Pierre (2006). "Nematodes". Micromammals and Macroparasites. pp. 63–79. doi:10.1007/978-4-431-36025-4_4. ISBN 978-4-431-36024-7.
- Morlan, Harvey B. (1952). "Host Relationships and Seasonal Abundance of Some Southwest Georgia Southwest Georgia Ectoparasites". American Midland Naturalist. 48 (1): 74–93. doi:10.2307/2422133. JSTOR 2422133.
- Musser, G.G. and Carleton, M.D. 2005. Superfamily Muroidea. Pp. 894–1531 in Wilson, D.E. and Reeder, D.M. (eds.). Mammal Species of the World: a taxonomic and geographic reference. 3rd ed. Baltimore: The Johns Hopkins University Press, 2 vols., 2142 pp. ISBN 978-0-8018-8221-0
- De Núñez, Margarita Ostrowski (1993). "Life-history studies of heterophyid trematodes in the Neotropical Region: Ascocotyle (Phagicola) diminuta (Stunkard & Haviland, 1924) and A. (P.) angrense Travassos, 1916". Systematic Parasitology. 24 (3): 191–199. doi:10.1007/BF00010532. S2CID 37277408.
- Pisanu, B.; Bain, O. (1999). "Aonchotheca musimon n. sp. (Nematoda: Capillariinae) from the mouflon Ovis musimon in the sub-Antarctic Kerguelen archipelago, with comments on the relationships with A. Bilobata (Bhalerao, 1933) Moravec, 1982 and other species of the genus". Systematic Parasitology. 43 (1): 17–27. doi:10.1023/A:1006119714038. PMID 10613527. S2CID 13242843.
- Pratt, Harry D.; Lane, John E. (1951). "Hoplopleura oryzomydis New Species, with Notes on Other United States Species of Hoplopleura (Anoplura: Haematopinidae)". The Journal of Parasitology. 37 (2): 141–146. doi:10.2307/3273444. JSTOR 3273444. PMID 14841556.
- Pulido-Flores, Griselda; Moreno-Flores, Shayuri; Monks, Scott (2005). "Helminths of Rodents (Rodentia: Muridae) from Metztitlán, San Cristóbal, and Rancho Santa Elena, Hidalgo, Mexico". Comparative Parasitology. 72 (2): 186–192. doi:10.1654/4146. S2CID 84990292.
- Radovsky, Frank J. (2007). "A new species of Ornithonyssus(Acari: Macronyssidae) in western North America and a review of nearctic species". International Journal of Acarology. 33 (3): 223–229. Bibcode:2007IJAca..33..223R. doi:10.1080/01647950708684526. S2CID 84813802.
- Del Rosario Robles, Maria; Navone, Graciela T.; Kinsella, John M. (2008). "A New Angiostrongylid (Nematoda) Species from the Pulmonary Arteries of Akodon azarae (Rodentia: Cricetidae) in Argentina". Journal of Parasitology. 94 (2): 515–519. doi:10.1645/GE-1340.1. PMID 18564753. S2CID 207249699.
- Schmidt, C. A.; Engstrom, M. D. (1994). "Genic Variation and Systematics of Rice Rats (Oryzomys palustris Species Group) in Southern Texas and Northeastern Tamaulipas, Mexico". Journal of Mammalogy. 75 (4): 914–928. doi:10.2307/1382473. JSTOR 1382473.
- Simões, Susana Balmant Emerique; Scholz, Tomáš; Barbosa, Helene Santos; Santos, Cláudia Portes (2006). "Taxonomic Status, Redescription, and Surface Ultrastructure of Ascocotyle (Phagicola) Pindoramensis N. Comb. (Digenea: Heterophyidae)". Journal of Parasitology. 92 (3): 501–508. doi:10.1645/GE-757R.1. PMID 16883992. S2CID 38681594.
- Sinclair, Norman R. (1971). "A Reviewal of Odhneria odhneri Travassos, 1921 (Trematoda: Microphallidae)". The Journal of Parasitology. 57 (5): 980–982. doi:10.2307/3277849. JSTOR 3277849. PMID 5133903.
- Sohn, Woon-Mok; Han, Eun-Taek; Chai, Jong-Yil (2003). "Acanthotrema felis n. sp. (Digenea: Heterophyidae) from the Small Intestine of Stray Cats in the Republic of Korea". Journal of Parasitology. 89 (1): 154–158. doi:10.1645/0022-3395(2003)089[0154:AFNSDH]2.0.CO;2. ISSN 0022-3395. PMID 12659320. S2CID 12783216.
- Sonenshine, D.E., Ratzlaff, R., Troyer, J.M., Demmerle, S.M., Demmerle, E., Jenkins, S. and Annis, B. 1993. Tick-host associations and maintenance of Borrelia burgdorferi in Virginia. Pp. 8–9 in Apperson, C.S., Levine, J.F. and Snoddy, E.L. (eds.). Proceedings of the 2nd Workshop on Lyme Disease in the Southeast. Raleigh: North Carolina State University.
- Tkach, Vasyl V.; Littlewood, D. Timothy J.; Olson, Peter D.; Kinsella, J. Mike; Swiderski, Zdzislaw (2003). "Molecular phylogenetic analysis of the Microphalloidea Ward, 1901 (Trematoda: Digenea)". Systematic Parasitology. 56 (1): 1–15. doi:10.1023/A:1025546001611. PMID 12975618. S2CID 4801094.
- Ubelaker, John E. (1986). "Systematics of Species Referred to the Genus angiostrongylus". The Journal of Parasitology. 72 (2): 237–244. doi:10.2307/3281599. JSTOR 3281599. PMID 3525794.
- Underwood, Harold T.; Owen, James G.; Engstrom, Mark D. (1986). "Endohelminths of Three Species of Oryzomys (Rodentia: Cricetidae) from San Luis Potosi, Mexico". The Southwestern Naturalist. 31 (3): 410. Bibcode:1986SWNat..31..410U. doi:10.2307/3671854. JSTOR 3671854.
- Verberg, Winona B.; Hunter, Wanda Sanborn (1961). "Studies on oxygen consumption in digenetic trematodes. V. The influence of temperature on three species of adult trematodes". Experimental Parasitology. 11: 34–38. doi:10.1016/0014-4894(61)90004-2. PMID 13780949.
- Whitaker, J.O. and Hamilton, W.J. 1998. Mammals of the Eastern United States. Cornell University Press, 583 pp. ISBN 978-0-8014-3475-4
- Whitaker, John O.; Wilson, Nixon (1974). "Host and Distribution Lists of Mites (Acari), Parasitic and Phoretic, in the Hair of Wild Mammals of North America, North of Mexico". American Midland Naturalist. 91 (1): 1–67. Bibcode:1974AMNat..91....1W. doi:10.2307/2424511. JSTOR 2424511.
- Whitaker, John O.; Wilson, Nixon (1974). "Host and Distribution Lists of Mites (Acari), Parasitic and Phoretic, in the Hair of Wild Mammals of North America, North of Mexico". American Midland Naturalist. 91 (1): 1–67. Bibcode:1974AMNat..91....1W. doi:10.2307/2424511. JSTOR 2424511.
- Williams, D.C., Wills, W., Durden, L.A. and Gray, E.W. 1999. Ticks of South Carolina (Acari: Ixodoidea). Journal of Vector Ecology 24(2):224-232.
- Wilson, Nixon; Durden, Lance A. (2003). "Ectoparasites of terrestrial vertebrates inhabiting the Georgia Barrier Islands, USA: An inventory and preliminary biogeographical analysis". Journal of Biogeography. 30 (8): 1207–1220. Bibcode:2003JBiog..30.1207W. doi:10.1046/j.1365-2699.2003.00894.x. S2CID 85145341.
- Wolfe, J.L. 1982. Oryzomys palustris. Mammalian Species 176:1-5.
- Worth, C. Brooke (1950). "Observations on Ectoparasites of Some Small Mammals in Everglades National Park and Hillsborough County, Florida". The Journal of Parasitology. 36 (4): 326–335. doi:10.2307/3273467. JSTOR 3273467. PMID 15437232.
