= Oryzomysia oryzomys =

Scientific classification
- Kingdom: Animalia
- Phylum: Arthropoda
- Subphylum: Chelicerata
- Class: Arachnida
- Order: Sarcoptiformes
- Family: Atopomelidae
- Genus: Oryzomysia
- Species: O. oryzomys

Binomial name
- Oryzomysia oryzomys (Radford, 1954)

Synonyms
- Chirodiscoides oryzomys; Listrophoroides oryzomys Radford, 1954

Species of mite

Oryzomysia oryzomys is a parasitic mite in the genus Oryzomysia of the family Atopomelidae. It has been found on the marsh rice rat (Oryzomys palustris) in Georgia. It was formerly known as Chirodiscoides oryzomys in the family Listrophoridae, but was later transferred to the atopomelid genus Oryzomysia.

== See also ==
- List of parasites of the marsh rice rat

== Literature cited ==
- Whitaker, J.O. and Wilson, N. 1974. Host and distribution lists of mites (Acari), parasitic and phoretic, in the hair of wild mammals of North America, north of Mexico (subscription required). American Midland Naturalist 91(1):1–67.
- Whitaker, J.O., Walters, B.L., Castor, L.K., Ritzi, C.M. and Wilson, N. 2007. Host and distribution lists of mites (Acari), parasitic and phoretic, in the hair or on the skin of North American wild mammals north of Mexico: records since 1974. Faculty Publications from the Harold W. Manter Laboratory of Parasitology, University of Nebraska, Lincoln 1:1–173.
