= Prolistrophorus grassii =

Scientific classification
- Kingdom: Animalia
- Phylum: Arthropoda
- Subphylum: Chelicerata
- Class: Arachnida
- Order: Sarcoptiformes
- Family: Listrophoridae
- Genus: Prolistrophorus
- Subgenus: Prolistrophorus
- Species: P. grassii

Binomial name
- Prolistrophorus grassii (Radford, 1954)

Species of mite

Prolistrophorus grassii is a parasitic mite in the genus Prolistrophorus. It was described as Listrophorus grassii (a member of the genus Listrophorus) in 1954 from the marsh rice rat (Oryzomys palustris) in Georgia. In 1974, Fain and Hyland placed it in Prolistrophorus and in 1984, Fain and Lukoschus redescribed the species on the basis of collections from the marsh rice rat in Georgia, Alabama, and Florida and the southern bog lemming (Synaptomys cooperi) in Indiana, West Virginia, and Iowa.

== See also ==
- List of parasites of the marsh rice rat

== Literature cited ==
- Fain, A. and Lukoschus, F.S. 1984. New observations on the genus Prolistrophorus Fain, 1970 (Acari: Astigmata: Listrophoridae) (subscription required). Systematic Parasitology 6:161–185.
- Whitaker, J.O. and Wilson, N. 1974. Host and distribution lists of mites (Acari), parasitic and phoretic, in the hair of wild mammals of North America, north of Mexico (subscription required). American Midland Naturalist 91(1):1–67.
