= Prolistrophorus bakeri =

Scientific classification
- Kingdom: Animalia
- Phylum: Arthropoda
- Subphylum: Chelicerata
- Class: Arachnida
- Order: Sarcoptiformes
- Family: Listrophoridae
- Genus: Prolistrophorus
- Subgenus: Beprolistrophorus
- Species: P. bakeri

Binomial name
- Prolistrophorus bakeri (Radford, 1949)

Species of mite

Prolistrophorus bakeri is a parasitic mite in the genus Prolistrophorus. Together with the Argentine P. hirstianus, it forms the subgenus Beprolistrophorus. P. bakeri has been found on the hispid cotton rat (Sigmodon hispidus), marsh rice rat (Oryzomys palustris), and cotton mouse (Peromyscus gossypinus) in Georgia, South Carolina, Texas, and Florida and on Oryzomys couesi in Colima. It was formerly placed in the genus Listrophorus.

== See also ==
- List of parasites of the marsh rice rat

== Literature cited ==
- Estébanes-González, M.L., Sánchez-Hernández, C., Romero-Almaraz, M. de L. and Schnell, G.D. 2011. Ácaros parásitos de roedores de Playa de Oro, Colima, México. Acta Zoológica Mexicana 27(1):169–176.
- Fain, A. and Lukoschus, F.S. 1984. New observations on the genus Prolistrophorus Fain, 1970 (Acari: Astigmata: Listrophoridae) (subscription required). Systematic Parasitology 6:161–185.
- Whitaker, J.O. and Wilson, N. 1974. Host and distribution lists of mites (Acari), parasitic and phoretic, in the hair of wild mammals of North America, north of Mexico (subscription required). American Midland Naturalist 91(1):1–67.
- Whitaker, J.O., Walters, B.L., Castor, L.K., Ritzi, C.M. and Wilson, N. 2007. Host and distribution lists of mites (Acari), parasitic and phoretic, in the hair or on the skin of North American wild mammals north of Mexico: records since 1974. Faculty Publications from the Harold W. Manter Laboratory of Parasitology, University of Nebraska, Lincoln 1:1–173.
