= Mastophorus muris =

Scientific classification
- Domain: Eukaryota
- Kingdom: Animalia
- Phylum: Nematoda
- Class: Chromadorea
- Order: Rhabditida
- Family: Spirocercidae
- Genus: Mastophorus
- Species: M. muris

Binomial name
- Mastophorus muris (Gmelin, 1790)

Synonyms
- Ascaris muris Gmelin, 1790

Species of roundworm

Mastophorus muris is a parasitic nematode in the genus Mastophorus. It infects animals such as the marsh rice rat (Oryzomys palustris), hispid cotton rat (Sigmodon hispidus), and singing vole (Microtus miurus).

== See also ==
- List of parasites of the marsh rice rat

== Literature cited ==
- Cole, F.R. and Wilson, D.E. 2010. Microtus miurus (Rodentia: Cricetidae). Mammalian Species 42(855):75–89.
- Kinsella, John Michael (1974). "Comparison of helminth parasites of the cotton rat, Sigmodon hispidus, from several habitats in Florida. American Museum novitates; no. 2540". hdl:2246/2742.
- Kinsella, J.M. 1988. Comparison of helminths of rice rats, Oryzomys palustris, from freshwater and saltwater marshes in Florida. Proceedings of the Helminthological Society of Washington 55(2):275–280.
