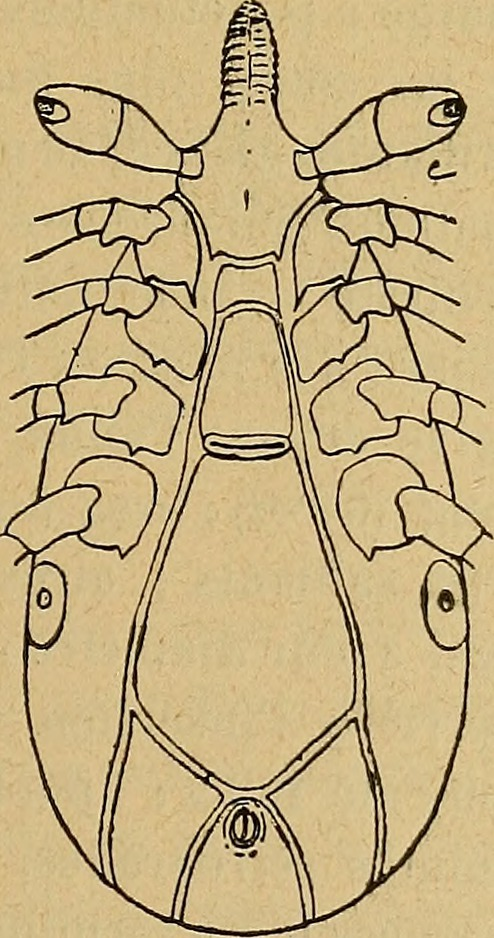
- Illustration of ventral side of Ixodes minor

Scientific classification
- Domain: Eukaryota
- Kingdom: Animalia
- Phylum: Arthropoda
- Subphylum: Chelicerata
- Class: Arachnida
- Order: Ixodida
- Family: Ixodidae
- Genus: Ixodes
- Species: I. minor

Binomial name
- Ixodes minor Neumann, 1902

= Ixodes minor =

Species of tick

Ixodes minor is a species of tick in the genus Ixodes. Some reported hosts are:

- Cardinalis cardinalis (Georgia)
- Seiurus noveboracensis (Georgia)
- Thryothorus ludovicianus (Georgia)
- Zonotrichia albicollis (Georgia)
- Troglodytes aedon (Georgia)
- Oryzomys palustris (South Carolina)
- Peromyscus gossypinus (Georgia)

== See also ==
- List of parasites of the marsh rice rat

== Literature cited ==
- Clark, K.L., Oliver, J.H., Jr., Grego, J.M., James, A.M., Durden, L.A. and Banks, C.W. 2001. Host associations of ticks parasitizing rodents at Borrelia burgdorferi enzootic sites in South Carolina (subscription required). Journal of Parasitology 87(6):1379–1386.
- Wilson, N. and Durden, L.A. 2003. Ectoparasites of terrestrial vertebrates inhabiting the Georgia Barrier Islands, USA: an inventory and preliminary biogeographical analysis (subscription required). Journal of Biogeography 30(8):1207–1220.
