= Eutrombicula splendens =

Scientific classification
- Domain: Eukaryota
- Kingdom: Animalia
- Phylum: Arthropoda
- Subphylum: Chelicerata
- Class: Arachnida
- Order: Trombidiformes
- Family: Trombiculidae
- Genus: Eutrombicula
- Species: E. splendens

Binomial name
- Eutrombicula splendens (Ewing, 1913)

Species of mite

Eutrombicula splendens is a species of chigger. In Florida, it has been found on the marsh rice rat (Oryzomys palustris) and hispid cotton rat (Sigmodon hispidus).

== See also ==
- List of parasites of the marsh rice rat

== Literature cited ==
- Worth, C.B. 1950. Observations on ectoparasites of some small mammals in Everglades National Park and Hillsborough County, Florida (subscription required). The Journal of Parasitology 36(4):326–335.
