= Gymnophalloides heardi =

Scientific classification
- Domain: Eukaryota
- Kingdom: Animalia
- Phylum: Platyhelminthes
- Class: Trematoda
- Order: Plagiorchiida
- Family: Gymnophallidae
- Genus: Gymnophalloides
- Species: G. heardi

Binomial name
- Gymnophalloides heardi Ching, 1995

Species of fluke

Gymnophalloides heardi is a parasitic fluke that infects the marsh rice rat Oryzomys palustris and the clapper rail Rallus crepitans. Its second intermediate host is the snail Melampus bidentatus (in genus Melampus). It is smaller than the two other species of Gymnophalloides, G. seoi and G. tokiensis.

== Literature cited ==
- Ching, H. L. 1995. Four new gymnophallid digeneans from rice rats, willets, and molluscs in Florida. Journal of Parasitology 81(6):924–928.
