= Odhneria odhneri =

Scientific classification
- Kingdom: Animalia
- Phylum: Platyhelminthes
- Class: Trematoda
- Order: Plagiorchiida
- Family: Microphallidae
- Genus: Odhneria
- Species: O. odhneri

Binomial name
- Odhneria odhneri Travassos, 1921

Synonyms
- Maritremoides raminellae Dery, 1958; Pseudospelotrema charadii Cable et al., 1960; Odhneria limnodromii Schall, 1967

Species of fluke

Odhneria odhneri is a digenean parasite in the genus Odhneria of the family Microphallidae. It infects several species of shorebirds, including the willet (Tringa semipalmata), as well as the marsh rice rat (Oryzomys palustris).

== See also ==
- List of parasites of the marsh rice rat

== Literature cited ==
- Kinsella, J.M. 1988. Comparison of helminths of rice rats, Oryzomys palustris, from freshwater and saltwater marshes in Florida. Proceedings of the Helminthological Society of Washington 55(2):275–280.
- Sinclair, N.R. 1971. A reviewal of Odhneria odhneri Travassos, 1921 (Trematoda: Microphallidae) (subscription required). The Journal of Parasitology 57(5):980–982.
