= Ixodes brunneus =

Scientific classification
- Domain: Eukaryota
- Kingdom: Animalia
- Phylum: Arthropoda
- Subphylum: Chelicerata
- Class: Arachnida
- Order: Ixodida
- Family: Ixodidae
- Genus: Ixodes
- Species: I. brunneus

Binomial name
- Ixodes brunneus Koch, 1844

Species of tick

Ixodes brunneus is a species of tick in the genus Ixodes. It is normally a parasite of birds, but has also been recorded on the marsh rice rat (Oryzomys palustris).

== See also ==
- List of parasites of the marsh rice rat

== Literature cited ==
- Wilson, N. and Durden, L.A. 2003. Ectoparasites of terrestrial vertebrates inhabiting the Georgia Barrier Islands, USA: an inventory and preliminary biogeographical analysis (subscription required). Journal of Biogeography 30(8):1207–1220.
