= Neodiplostomum craterum =

Scientific classification
- Domain: Eukaryota
- Kingdom: Animalia
- Phylum: Platyhelminthes
- Class: Trematoda
- Order: Diplostomida
- Family: Diplostomidae
- Genus: Neodiplostomum
- Species: N. craterum

Binomial name
- Neodiplostomum craterum (Barker & Noll in Barker, 1915) Pearson, 1961

Synonyms
- Fibricola cratera (Barker & Noll in Barker, 1915) Dubois, 1932; Fibricola laruei Miller, 1940; Fibricola lucida (La Rue & Bosma, 1927) Dubois & Rausch, 1950; Hemistomum craterum Barker & Noll in Barker, 1915; Neodiplostomum cratera (Barker & Noll in Barker, 1915) Achatz, Pulis, Woodyard, Rosser, Martens, Weinstein, Fecchio, McAllister, Bonilla & Tkach, 2022; Neodiplostomum lucidum La Rue & Bosma, 1927

Species of fluke

Neodiplostomum craterum is a fluke that infects Virginia opossums (Didelphis virginiana), American minks (Neogale vison), and marsh rice rats (Oryzomys palustris) in North America. In a study in Florida, F. lucida was the only fluke of the marsh rice rat (among 21 species recorded) that occurred in both the freshwater marsh at Paynes Prairie Preserve State Park and the saltwater marsh at Cedar Key. At the former locality, it infected 11% of rice rats and the number of worms per infected rat ranged from 1 to 65, averaging 17. At Cedar Key, 67% of rice rats were infected and the number of worms per infected rat ranged from 1 to 1975, averaging 143.

== See also ==
- List of parasites of the marsh rice rat

== Literature cited ==
- Kinsella, J.M. 1988. Comparison of helminths of rice rats, Oryzomys palustris, from freshwater and saltwater marshes in Florida. Proceedings of the Helminthological Society of Washington 55(2):275–280.
- Kontrimavichus, V.L. 1985. Helminths of mustelids and trends in their evolution. Amerind Publishing Company, 607 pp.
