= Parastrongylus schmidti =

Scientific classification
- Kingdom: Animalia
- Phylum: Nematoda
- Class: Chromadorea
- Order: Rhabditida
- Family: Angiostrongylidae
- Genus: Parastrongylus
- Species: P. schmidti

Binomial name
- Parastrongylus schmidti (Kinsella, 1971)

Synonyms
- Angiostrongylus schmidti Kinsella, 1971

Species of roundworm

Parastrongylus schmidti is a species of parasitic nematode in the genus Parastrongylus. It was first described as Angiostrongylus schmidti in 1971 from the marsh rice rat (Oryzomys palustris) in Florida. However, a revision of genus Angiostrongylus assigned the species infecting rodents to Parastrongylus.

== See also ==
- List of parasites of the marsh rice rat
