= Ixodes texanus =

Scientific classification
- Kingdom: Animalia
- Phylum: Arthropoda
- Subphylum: Chelicerata
- Class: Arachnida
- Order: Ixodida
- Family: Ixodidae
- Genus: Ixodes
- Species: I. texanus

Binomial name
- Ixodes texanus Banks, 1909

Species of tick

Ixodes texanus is a species of ticks in the genus Ixodes. It mainly infects raccoons (Procyon lotor), but has also been recorded on the marsh rice rat (Oryzomys palustris) in Georgia.

== See also ==
- List of parasites of the marsh rice rat

== Literature cited ==
- Wilson, N. and Durden, L.A. 2003. Ectoparasites of terrestrial vertebrates inhabiting the Georgia Barrier Islands, USA: an inventory and preliminary biogeographical analysis (subscription required). Journal of Biogeography 30(8):1207–1220.
