= Ixodes affinis =

Scientific classification
- Domain: Eukaryota
- Kingdom: Animalia
- Phylum: Arthropoda
- Subphylum: Chelicerata
- Class: Arachnida
- Order: Ixodida
- Family: Ixodidae
- Genus: Ixodes
- Species: I. affinis

Binomial name
- Ixodes affinis Neumann

Species of tick

Ixodes affinis is a species of tick in the genus Ixodes. Some reported hosts are:

- Thryothorus ludovicianus (Georgia)
- Blarina carolinensis (Georgia)
- Scalopus aquaticus (Georgia)
- Odocoileus virginianus (Georgia)
- Oryzomys palustris (Georgia)
- Peromyscus gossypinus (Georgia)
- Sciurus carolinensis (Georgia)
- Procyon lotor (Georgia)

== See also ==
- List of parasites of the marsh rice rat

== Literature cited ==
- Wilson, N. and Durden, L.A. 2003. Ectoparasites of terrestrial vertebrates inhabiting the Georgia Barrier Islands, USA: an inventory and preliminary biogeographical analysis (subscription required). Journal of Biogeography 30(8):1207–1220.
