= Zonorchis komareki =

Scientific classification
- Kingdom: Animalia
- Phylum: Platyhelminthes
- Class: Trematoda
- Order: Plagiorchiida
- Family: Dicrocoeliidae
- Genus: Zonorchis
- Species: Z. komareki

Binomial name
- Zonorchis komareki (McIntosh, 1939)

Species of worm

Zonorchis komareki is a fluke in the genus Zonorchis. It is known to infect the cotton mouse (Peromyscus gossypinus), marsh rice rat (Oryzomys palustris), and eastern harvest mouse (Reithrodontomys humulis) in the eastern United States.

== See also ==
- List of parasites of the marsh rice rat

== Literature cited ==
- McKeever, S. 1971. Zonorchis komareki (McIntosh, 1939) (Trematoda: Dicrocoeliidae) from Reithrodontomys humulis (Audubon and Bachman). The Journal of Parasitology 57(4):865.
