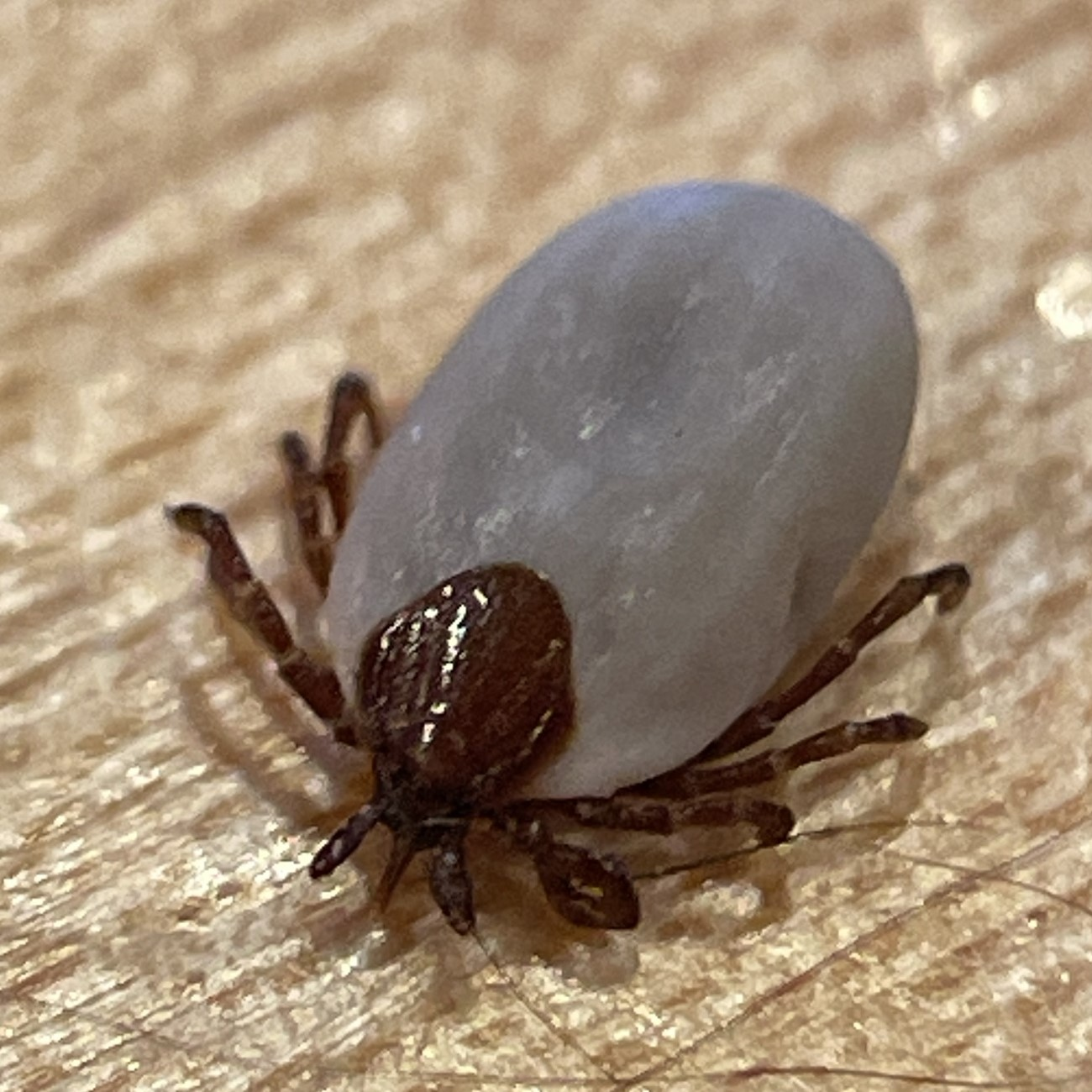

Scientific classification
- Domain: Eukaryota
- Kingdom: Animalia
- Phylum: Arthropoda
- Subphylum: Chelicerata
- Class: Arachnida
- Order: Ixodida
- Family: Ixodidae
- Genus: Ixodes
- Species: I. cookei

Binomial name
- Ixodes cookei Packard, 1869

= Ixodes cookei =

Species of tick

Ixodes cookei is a species of tick. It is normally a parasite of carnivorans, such as raccoons, foxes, and weasels, but has also been recorded on the groundhog (Marmota monax) and the marsh rice rat (Oryzomys palustris). In the northeastern United States, it is a vector of Powassan virus.

== See also ==
- List of parasites of the marsh rice rat

== Literature cited ==
- Levine, J.F.; Sonenshine, D.E.; Nicholson, W.L.; Turner, R.T. (1991). "Borrelia burgdorferi in Ticks (Acari: Ixodidae) from Coastal Virginia". Journal of Medical Entomology. 28 (5): 668–674. doi:10.1093/jmedent/28.5.668. PMID 1941936.
- Reeves, W.K.; Durden, L.A.; Ritzi, C.M.; Beckham, K.R.; Super, P.E.; OConnor, B.M. (2007). "Ectoparasites and other ectosymbiotic arthropods of vertebrates in the Great Smoky Mountains National Park, USA". Zootaxa. 1392 (1): 31. doi:10.11646/zootaxa.1392.1.2.
