= Probolocoryphe glandulosa =

Scientific classification
- Domain: Eukaryota
- Kingdom: Animalia
- Phylum: Platyhelminthes
- Class: Trematoda
- Order: Plagiorchiida
- Family: Microphallidae
- Genus: Probolocoryphe
- Species: P. glandulosa

Binomial name
- Probolocoryphe glandulosa (Coil, 1955)

Synonyms
- Maritrema glandulosus Coil, 1955; Mecynophallus glandulosus: Cable et al., 1960; Probolocoryphe glandulosa: Heard and Sikora, 1969

Species of fluke

Probolocoryphe glandulosa is a digenean parasite in the genus Probolocoryphe of family Microphallidae. Recorded hosts include the clapper rail (Rallus crepitans), ruddy turnstone (Arenaria interpres), raccoon (Procyon lotor), little blue heron (Ardea caerulea), Wilson's plover (Charadrius wilsonia), black-bellied plover (Pluvialis squatarola), and marsh rice rat (Oryzomys palustris).

== Literature cited ==
- Heard, R.W., III and Sikora, W.B. 1969. Probolocoryphe Otagaki, 1958 (Trematoda: Microphallidae), a senior synonym of Mecynophallus Cable, Connor, and Balling, 1960, with notes on the genus (subscription required). The Journal of Parasitology 55(3):674–675.
- Kinsella, J.M. 1988. Comparison of helminths of rice rats, Oryzomys palustris, from freshwater and saltwater marshes in Florida. Proceedings of the Helminthological Society of Washington 55(2):275–280.
