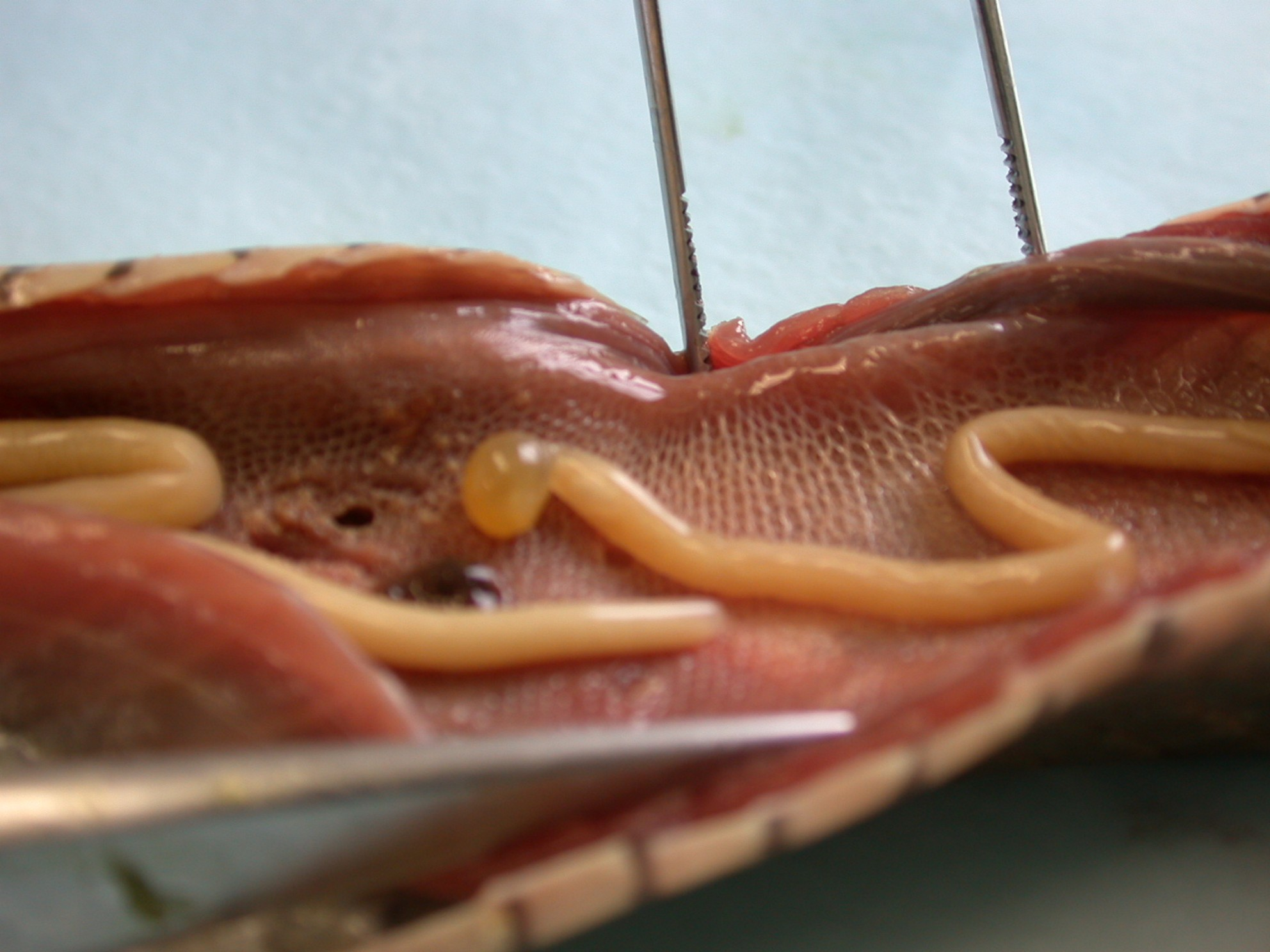
- Specimens infesting a snake Platyceps karelini

Scientific classification
- Domain: Eukaryota
- Kingdom: Animalia
- Phylum: Arthropoda
- Class: Ichthyostraca
- Order: Porocephalida
- Family: Porocephalidae
- Genus: Porocephalus
- Species: P. crotali

Binomial name
- Porocephalus crotali (Humboldt, 1808)

Synonyms
- Echinorhynchus crotali Humboldt, 1808; Pentastoma proboscideum Rudolphi, 1812; Porocephalus humboldtii Mayer; Linguatula quadriuncinata Mayer; Pentastoma moniliforme Megnin; Pentastoma subcylindricum Diesing

= Porocephalus crotali =

Species of crustacean

Porocephalus crotali is a parasitic crustacean from the group Pentastomida, also known as tongue worms.

== Morphology ==
Porocephalus crotali is cylindrical and annulated (having ring-like segments) with 38–40 body segments, a digestive system, centrally located mouth surrounded by four hooks making it seem like it has five mouths — hence the name “pentastomes” .

== Life cycle ==
Mammals are the intermediate hosts and snakes are the definitive hosts.

Once the larva hatches from the egg, it penetrates the duodenal mucosa of the host. The process from swallowing the egg to complete entry into the host takes about an hour. After reaching the duodenal mucosa, the larvae migrate to the abdominal cavity, where they spend about a week until they are encapsulated in the host tissue. Over a three-month period, the parasite molts five additional times, increasing in size and developing segmentation. The sex of the parasite becomes identifiable after the fifth molt. Upon completing the sixth molt, the nymphs become encapsulated and enter a dormant state. If a snake eats the nymph, the nymph loses its dormancy and quickly enters the intestinal wall of the snake where it travels to the lungs. They then feed on the blood and tissue fluids in the lungs until they reach maturity.

== Disease ==
The larval stages in the nymph may cause visceral pentastomiasis in humans . Visceral pentastomiasis has been reported from Africa, Malaysia and the Middle East.
