= Levinseniella deblocki =

Scientific classification
- Kingdom: Animalia
- Phylum: Platyhelminthes
- Class: Trematoda
- Order: Plagiorchiida
- Family: Microphallidae
- Genus: Levinseniella
- Species: L. deblocki

Binomial name
- Levinseniella deblocki Heard and Kinsella, 1995

Species of fluke

Levinseniella deblocki is a parasitic fluke that occurs in salt marshes along the eastern coast of the Gulf of Mexico. Its life cycle includes a metacercarial stage in the gonads of fiddler crabs (Uca) and one intermediate host is a gastropod from the genus Heleobops (family Hydrobiidae). Adults are found in the digestive tracts of marsh rice rats (Oryzomys palustris), raccoons (Procyon lotor), and clapper rails (Rallus crepitans). Within the subgenus Austromicrophallus, L. deblocki is most similar to the European L. polydactyla and the Californian L. ophidea, but differs in size, ecology, and morphology.

== Literature cited ==
- Heard, R.W. and Kinsella, J.M. 1995. Levinseniella deblocki, new species (Trematoda: Digenea: Microphallidae) from salt marshes along the eastern Gulf of Mexico with notes on its functional morphology and life history (abstract only). Gulf Research Reports 9(2):97–103.
