= Ascocotyle angrense =

Scientific classification
- Kingdom: Animalia
- Phylum: Platyhelminthes
- Class: Trematoda
- Order: Plagiorchiida
- Family: Heterophyidae
- Genus: Ascocotyle
- Species: A. angrense

Binomial name
- Ascocotyle angrense Travassos, 1916

Species of fluke

Ascocotyle angrense is a fluke in the genus Ascocotyle that mainly infects birds. It has previously been confused with A. diminuta, which infects fish-eating birds and raccoons. It has also been recorded from the marsh rice rat (Oryzomys palustris) in a saltwater marsh at Cedar Key, Florida, where it occurred in 25% of animals.

== Literature cited ==
- Kinsella, J.M. 1988. Comparison of helminths of rice rats, Oryzomys palustris, from freshwater and saltwater marshes in Florida. Proceedings of the Helminthological Society of Washington 55(2):275–280.
- Núñez, M.O. de. 1993. Life-history studies of heterophyid trematodes in the Neotropical Region: Ascocotyle (Phagicola) diminuta (Stunkard & Haviland, 1924) and A. (P.) angrense Travassos, 1916 (subscription required). Systematic Parasitology 24:191–199.
