= Lyperosomum intermedium =

Scientific classification
- Domain: Eukaryota
- Kingdom: Animalia
- Phylum: Platyhelminthes
- Class: Trematoda
- Order: Plagiorchiida
- Family: Dicrocoeliidae
- Genus: Lyperosomum
- Species: L. intermedium

Binomial name
- Lyperosomum intermedium Denton & Kinsella, 1972

Species of fluke

Lyperosomum intermedium is a parasitic trematode belonging to the subclass Digenea that infects the marsh rice rat (Oryzomys palustris). The species was first described in 1972 by Denton and Kinsella, who wrote that it was closest to Lyperosomum sinuosum, known from birds and raccoons in the United States and Brazil. Three years later, Denton and Kissinger placed the two, together with a number of other species, in a new subgenus of Lyperosomum, Sinuosoides. Species of Lyperosomum mainly infect birds; L. intermedium is one of the few species to infect a mammal.

Lyperosomum intermedium is a long-bodied, parallel-sided, semitransparent worm with rounded ends. Length is 1650 to 4200 μm and width is 335 to 420 μm. The pharynx is rounded and has a diameter of 60 to 74 μm and the esophagus is straight to a bit curved in form and about 60 μm long. The testes are oval to rounded and have a diameter of 111 to 240 μm. The uterus is large. Eggs are light brown, have thin shells, and are 46 to 51 μm long and 23 to 27 μm wide. L. intermedium is smaller and broader than L. sinuosum and does not tend to assume a curved shape in fixation, as that species does. The two also differ in other anatomical details, such as the location and size of various body parts.

Lyperosomum intermedium has been found in rats of saltmarshes in Florida and Georgia. It was found in 28 of 72 rice rats at Cedar Key, Florida, with the number of flukes per infected rat ranging from one to 150 (average 17), and in five of six rice rats from Sapelo Island, Georgia, with two to 51 flukes per rat (average 18), but did not occur in more than 100 rice rats from freshwater marshes in Florida. It infects the pancreas.

== Literature cited ==
- Denton, J.F. and Kinsella, J.M. 1972. Lyperosomum intermedium sp. n. (Digenea: Dicrocoeliidae) from the rice rat, Oryzomys palustris, from southeastern salt marshes (subscription required). The Journal of Parasitology 58(2):226–228.
- Denton, J.F. and Kissinger, W.A. 1975. Lyperosomum byrdi sp. n. (Digenea: Dicrocoeliidae) from the rufous-sided towhee Pipilo erythrophthalmus (L.), with a revised synopsis of the genus. Proceedings of the Helminthological Society of Washington 42(1):38–42.
