= Gymnophalloides =

Scientific classification
- Kingdom: Animalia
- Phylum: Platyhelminthes
- Class: Trematoda
- Order: Plagiorchiida
- Family: Gymnophallidae
- Genus: Gymnophalloides; Fujita, 1925

Genus of flatworms

Gymnophalloides is a genus of flatworms belonging to the family Gymnophallidae.

The species of this genus are found in America.

Species:

- Gymnophalloides heardi Ching, 1995
- Gymnophalloides nacellae Cremonte, Pina, Gilardoni, Rodrigues, Chai & Ituarte, 2013
- Gymnophalloides seoi Lee, Chai & Hong, 1993
- Gymnophalloides tokiensis Fujita, 1925
