= Polygenis gwyni =

Scientific classification
- Kingdom: Animalia
- Phylum: Arthropoda
- Class: Insecta
- Order: Siphonaptera
- Family: Rhopalopsyllidae
- Genus: Polygenis
- Species: P. gwyni

Binomial name
- Polygenis gwyni (C. Fox, 1914)

Species of flea

Polygenis gwyni is a flea that commonly infects the hispid cotton rat (Sigmodon hispidus) in the southern United States; it is also frequently found on other species ecologically associated with the cotton rat. Hosts recorded in South Carolina include the cotton rat as well as the Florida woodrat (Neotoma floridana), cotton mouse (Peromyscus gossypinus), marsh rice rat (Oryzomys palustris), and brown rat (Rattus norvegicus).

== Literature cited ==
- Durden, L.A., Wills, W. and Clark, K.L. 1999. The fleas (Siphonaptera) of South Carolina with an assessment of their vectorial importance. Journal of Vector Ecology 24(2):171–181.
