= Epitedia wenmanni =

Scientific classification
- Domain: Eukaryota
- Kingdom: Animalia
- Phylum: Arthropoda
- Class: Insecta
- Order: Siphonaptera
- Suborder: Hystrichopsyllomorpha
- Superfamily: Hystrichopsylloidea
- Family: Ctenophthalmidae
- Genus: Epitedia
- Species: E. wenmanni

Binomial name
- Epitedia wenmanni (Rothschild)

Species of flea

Epitedia wenmanni is a species of flea in the family Hystrichopsyllidae. It is common throughout North America and associated mainly with Peromyscus (deermice), although many other hosts have been recorded. In Missouri, it has been found on the cat (Felis silvestris), white-footed mouse (Peromyscus leucopus), including nests, marsh rice rat (Oryzomys palustris), and western harvest mouse (Reithrodontomys megalotis). Hosts recorded in Tennessee include the northern short-tailed shrew (Blarina brevicauda), eastern chipmunk (Tamias striatus), southern red-backed vole (Myodes gapperi), white-footed mouse, and golden mouse (Ochrotomys nuttalli).

== Literature cited ==
- Durden, L.A. and Kollars, T.M., Jr. 1997. The fleas (Siphonaptera) of Tennessee. Journal of Vector Ecology 22(1):13–22.
- Kollars, T.M., Jr., Durden, L.A. and Oliver, J.H., Jr. 1997. Fleas and lice parasitizing mammals in Missouri. Journal of Vector Ecology 22(2):125–132.
