= Gymnophallidae =

Scientific classification
- Kingdom: Animalia
- Phylum: Platyhelminthes
- Class: Trematoda
- Order: Plagiorchiida
- Suborder: Gymnophallata
- Superfamily: Gymnophalloidea
- Family: Gymnophallidae; Odhner, 1905

Family of flukes

Gymnophallidae is a family of trematodes in the order Plagiorchiida.

== Genera ==
- Bartolius Cremonte, 2001
- Gymnophalloides Fujita in Dollfus, 1925
- Gymnophallus Odhner, 1900
- Parvatrema Cable, 1953
- Pseudogymnophallus Hoberg, 1981
