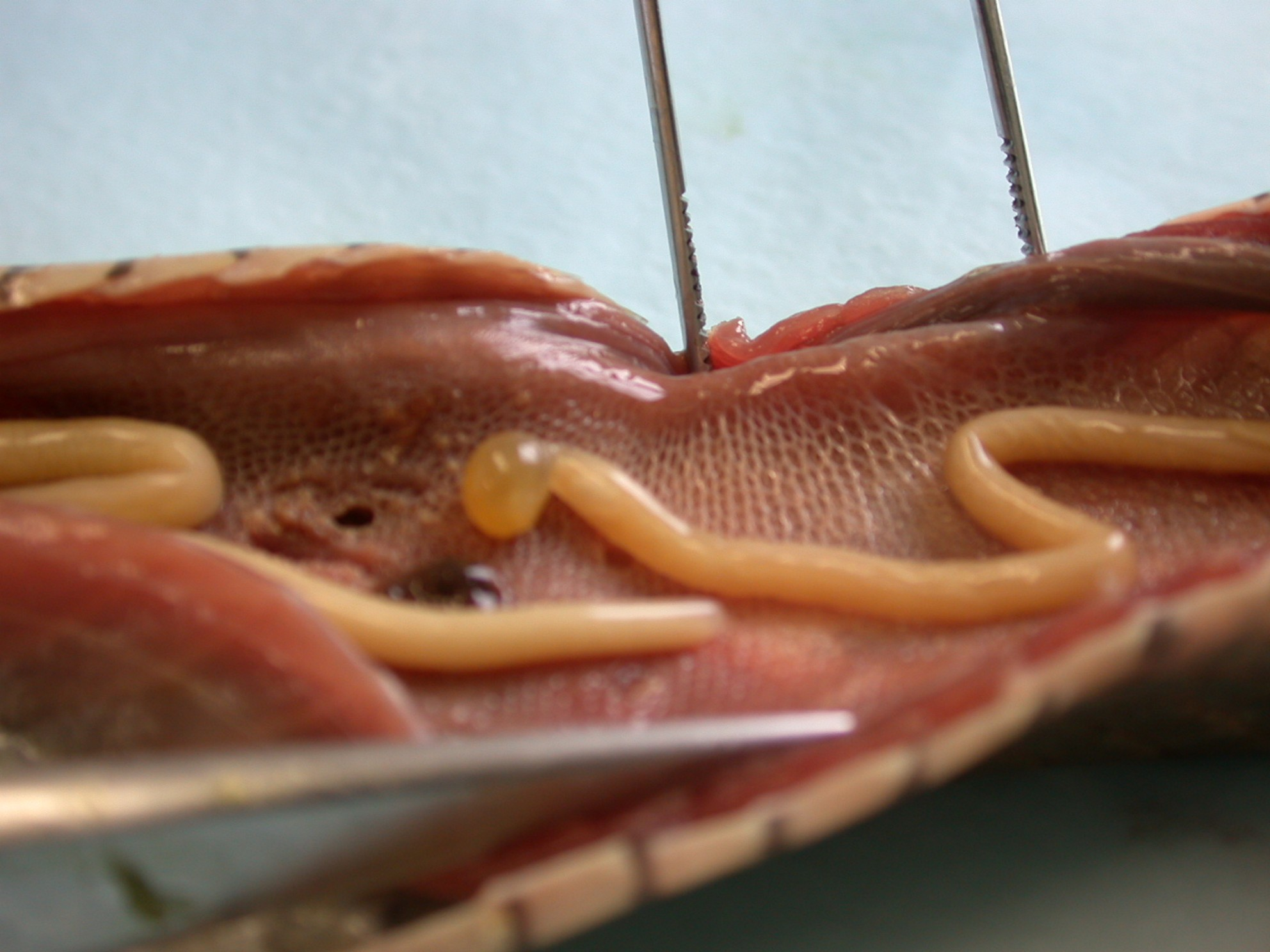
- Porocephalus crotali

Scientific classification
- Domain: Eukaryota
- Kingdom: Animalia
- Phylum: Arthropoda
- Class: Ichthyostraca
- Order: Porocephalida
- Superfamily: Porocephaloidea
- Family: Porocephalidae; Sambon, 1922

Synonyms
- Pentastomidae Shipley, 1909

= Porocephalidae =

Family of crustaceans

Porocephalidae is a family of crustaceans belonging to the order Porocephalida.

Genera:

- Armillifer Sambon, 1922
- Cubirea Kishida, 1928
- Elenia Heymons, 1932
- Gigliolella Chabaud & Choquet, 1954
- Kiricephalus Sambon, 1922
- Parasambonia Stunkard & Gandal, 1968
- Polystoma 2020
- Porocephalus Humboldt, 1812
- Waddycephalus Sambon, 1922
