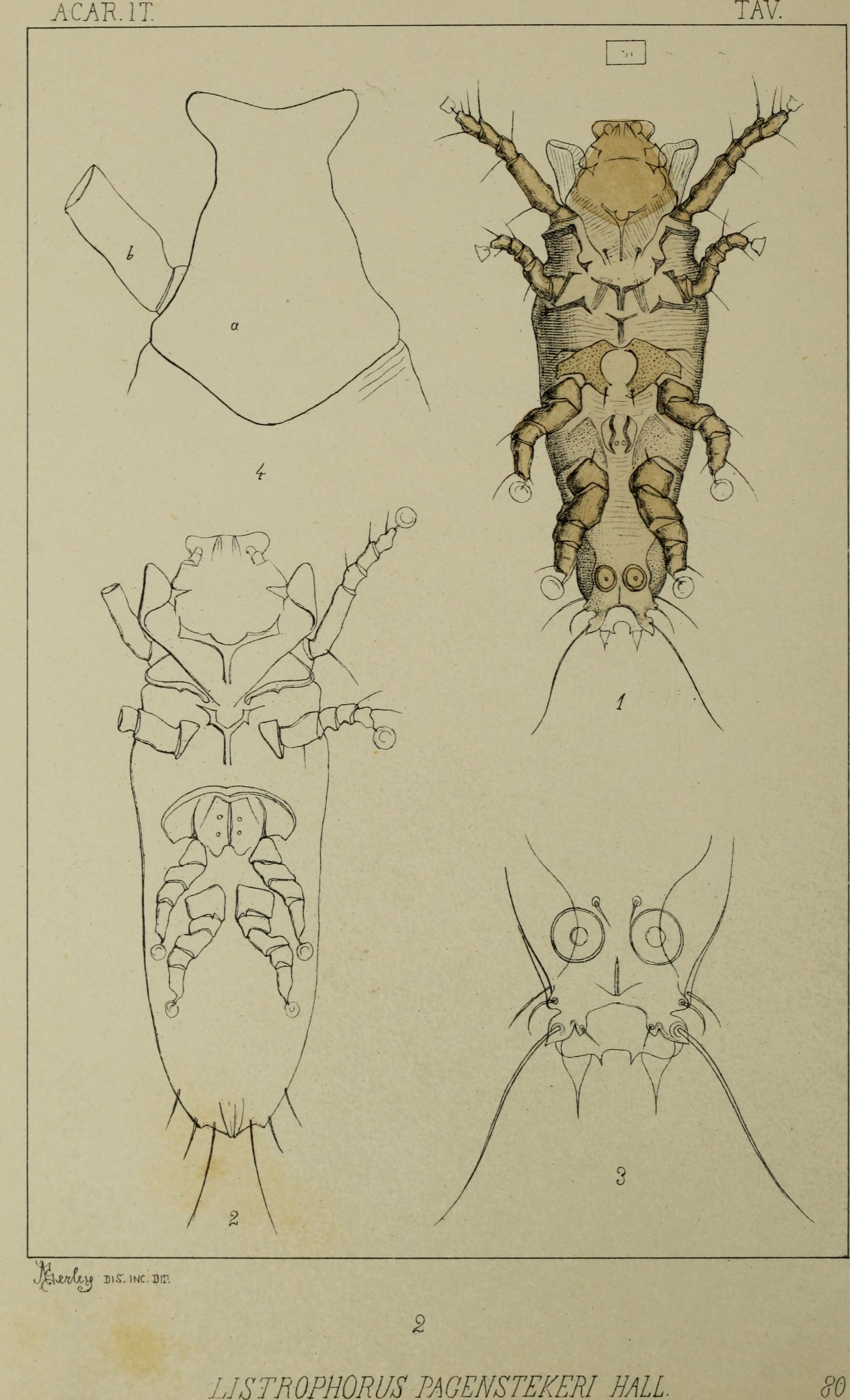
- Listrophorus pagenstekeri

Scientific classification
- Kingdom: Animalia
- Phylum: Arthropoda
- Subphylum: Chelicerata
- Class: Arachnida
- Order: Sarcoptiformes
- Suborder: Astigmata
- Family: Listrophoridae; Canestrini, 1892

Type genus
- Listrophorus

Genera
- Leporacarus Fain, 1970; Listrophoroides Hirst, 1923; Listrophorus Pagenstecher, 1861; Marquesania Womersley, 1943

= Listrophoridae =

Family of mites

Listrophoridae is a family of mites in the suborder Psoroptidia of the order Sarcoptiformes. The family contains small, long mites specialized for grasping the hairs of mammals. North American genera include:

- Aplodontochirus
- Chirodiscoides
- Dentocarpus
- Geomylichus
- Leporacarus
- Listrophorus
- Lutracarus
- Lynxacarus
- Olabidocarpus
- Olistrophorus
- Prolistrophorus
- Quasilistrophorus

Asiochirus is one Asian genus. Unidentified listrophorids have been found on the marsh rice rat (Oryzomys palustris) in Florida and Georgia.

== See also ==
- List of parasites of the marsh rice rat

== Literature cited ==
- Whitaker, J.O. and Wilson, N. 1974. Host and distribution lists of mites (Acari), parasitic and phoretic, in the hair of wild mammals of North America, north of Mexico (subscription required). American Midland Naturalist 91(1):1–67.
- Whitaker, J.O., Walters, B.L., Castor, L.K., Ritzi, C.M. and Wilson, N. 2007. Host and distribution lists of mites (Acari), parasitic and phoretic, in the hair or on the skin of North American wild mammals north of Mexico: records since 1974. Faculty Publications from the Harold W. Manter Laboratory of Parasitology, University of Nebraska, Lincoln 1:1–173.
- Wilson, N. and Durden, L.A. 2003. Ectoparasites of terrestrial vertebrates inhabiting the Georgia Barrier Islands, USA: an inventory and preliminary biogeographical analysis (subscription required). Journal of Biogeography 30(8):1207–1220.
- Worth, C.B. 1950. Observations on ectoparasites of some small mammals in Everglades National Park and Hillsborough County, Florida (subscription required). The Journal of Parasitology 36(4):326–335.
