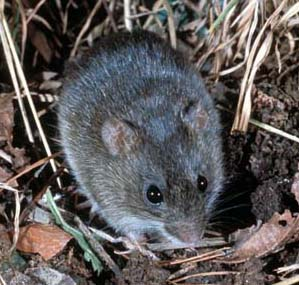

Conservation status
- Least Concern (IUCN 3.1)

Scientific classification
- Kingdom: Animalia
- Phylum: Chordata
- Class: Mammalia
- Order: Rodentia
- Family: Cricetidae
- Subfamily: Sigmodontinae
- Genus: Oryzomys
- Species: O. palustris

Binomial name
- Oryzomys palustris (Harlan, 1837)
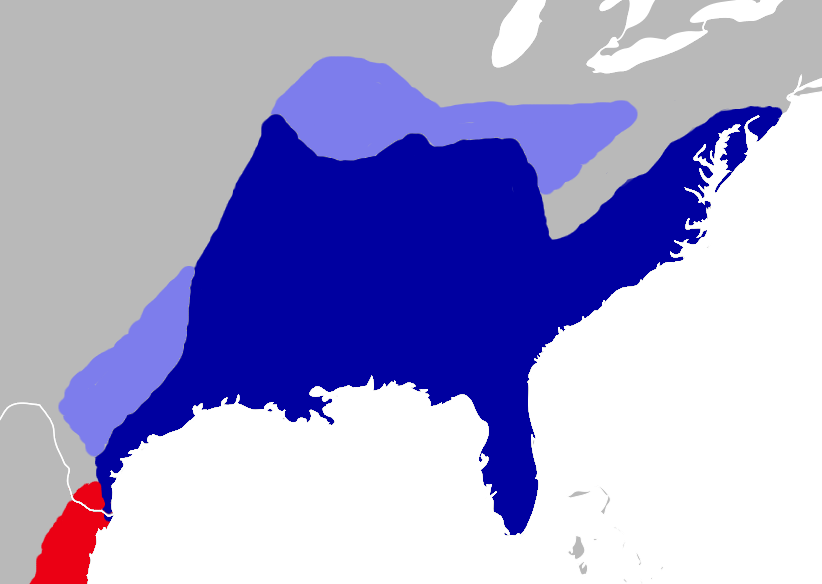
- Current (blue) and approximate former (light blue) distribution of the marsh rice rat in the eastern United States. A small part of the distribution of Oryzomys couesi is also shown (red).

Synonyms
- Mus palustris Harlan, 1837; Arvicola oryzivora Bachman, 1854; Oryzomys palustris: Baird, 1857; Oryzomys palustris natator Chapman, 1893; ?Oryzomys palustris texensis J.A. Allen, 1894; Oryzomys palustris coloratus Bangs, 1898; Oryzomys natator floridanus Merriam, 1901; Oryzomys fossilis Hibbard, 1955; Oryzomys palustris planirostris Hamilton, 1955; Oryzomys palustris sanibeli Hamilton, 1955; ?Oryzomys argentatus Spitzer and Lazell, 1978

= Marsh rice rat =

Marsh rice rat Temporal range: Rancholabrean (300,000 years before present) – present

North American species of rodent

The marsh rice rat (Oryzomys palustris) is a semiaquatic North American rodent in the family Cricetidae. It usually occurs in wetland habitats, such as swamps and salt marshes. It is found mostly in the eastern and southern United States, from New Jersey and Kansas south to Florida and northeasternmost Tamaulipas, Mexico; its range previously extended further west and north, where it may have been a commensal in corn-cultivating communities. Weighing about 40 to 80 g (1.4 to 2.8 oz), the marsh rice rat is a medium-sized rodent that resembles the common black and brown rat. The upperparts are generally gray-brown, but are reddish in many Florida populations. The feet show several specializations for life in the water. The skull is large and flattened, and is short at the front.

John Bachman discovered the marsh rice rat in 1816, and it was formally described in 1837. Several subspecies have been described since the 1890s, mainly from Florida, but disagreement exists over their validity. The Florida Keys population is sometimes classified as a different species, the silver rice rat (O. argentatus). Data from the mitochondrial cytochrome b gene indicate a deep divergence between populations east of Mississippi and those further west, which suggests that the western populations may be recognized as a separate species, O. texensis. The species is part of the genus Oryzomys, which also includes several others occurring further south in Mexico, Central America, and northwestern South America, some of which have previously been regarded as subspecies of the marsh rice rat. One, O. couesi, occurs with the marsh rice rat in Tamaulipas and southern Texas.

The marsh rice rat is active during the night, makes nests of sedge and grass, and occasionally builds runways. Its diverse diet includes plants, fungi, and a variety of animals. Population densities are usually below 10 per ha (4 per acre) and home ranges vary from 0.23 to 0.37 ha (0.57 to 0.91 acres), depending on sex and geography. Litters of generally three to five young are born after a pregnancy around 25 days, mainly during the summer. Newborns are helpless at birth, but are weaned after a few weeks. Several animals prey on the marsh rice rat, including the barn owl, and it usually lives for less than a year in the wild. It is infected by many different parasites and harbors a hantavirus that also infects humans. The species is not of conservation concern, but some populations are threatened.

== Taxonomy ==
The marsh rice rat is classified as one of eight species in the genus Oryzomys, which is distributed from the eastern United States (marsh rice rat) into northwestern South America (O. gorgasi). Oryzomys previously included many other species, which were reclassified in various studies culminating in contributions by Marcelo Weksler and coworkers in 2006 that removed more than 40 species from the genus. All are placed in the tribe Oryzomyini ("rice rats"), a diverse assemblage of over 100 species, and on higher taxonomic levels in the subfamily Sigmodontinae of the family Cricetidae, along with hundreds of other species of mainly small rodents, most of which occur in South and Central America. In the United States, the marsh rice rat is the only oryzomyine rodent except for Oryzomys couesi in a small area of southern Texas; the only other sigmodontines present are several species of cotton rats (Sigmodon) in the southern half of the country.

=== Early history ===
The marsh rice rat was discovered in 1816 in South Carolina by John Bachman. Bachman intended to describe the species as Arvicola oryzivora, but sent a specimen to Richard Harlan and Charles Pickering at the Academy of Natural Sciences in Philadelphia to confirm its identity. Another specimen, from New Jersey, was found in the academy's collection, and Harlan took it upon himself, against Pickering's wishes, to describe the new species as Mus palustris, proclaiming it one of the few true rats of the United States. The specific name palustris is Latin for "marshy" and refers to the usual habitat of the species.

In 1854, in The quadrupeds of North America, Bachman redescribed it as Arvicola oryzivora, considering it more closely related to the voles then placed in the genus Arvicola, and also recorded it from Georgia and Florida. Three years later, Spencer Fullerton Baird argued that the referral of the species to Arvicola was erroneous and introduced a new generic name for the marsh rice rat, Oryzomys. The name combines the Greek oryza "rice" and mys "mouse" and refers to the rat's habit of eating rice. At the time, Oryzomys was recognized either as a full genus or as a subgenus of the now-defunct genus Hesperomys, but since the 1890s, it has been universally recognized as a genus distinct from Hesperomys, with the marsh rice rat (Oryzomys palustris) as its type species.

=== Species boundaries and subspecies ===
In the 1890s, several subspecies of the marsh rice rat were described from the United States: O. p. natator from Florida in 1893, O. p. texensis from Texas in 1894, and O. p. coloratus from elsewhere in Florida in 1898. Clinton Hart Merriam recognized O. p. natator as a separate species in 1901 and described a subspecies of it, O. p. floridanus, but considered O. p. texensis to be nearly identical to nominate O. p. palustris. In his 1918 revision of North American Oryzomys, Edward Alphonso Goldman again recognized all these as a single species, O. palustris. He distinguished four subspecies, which he said formed a "closely intergrading series"—O. p. palustris from New Jersey to southeastern Mississippi and eastern Missouri; O. p. natator in central Florida; O. p. coloratus (including O. natator floridanus Merriam) in southern Florida; and O. p. texensis from western Mississippi and southeastern Kansas to eastern Texas. Two additional subspecies were described by William J. Hamilton in 1955 from southern Florida: O. p. planirostris from Pine Island and 2 mi (3.2 km) north of Fort Myers and O. p. sanibeli from Sanibel Island. Also in 1955, Claude W. Hibbard described a new species of Oryzomys, O. fossilis, from Pleistocene deposits in Kansas, on the basis of small differences in characters of the tooth with living marsh rice rats. In 1965, Walter Dalquest demoted this species, later also found in Texas, to a subspecies, because it does not differ more from living marsh rice rats than the latter differ from each other.

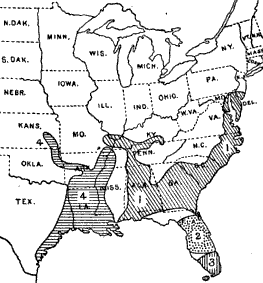
Distribution and subspecies of the marsh rice rat according to Goldman (1918): 1. O. p. palustris; 2. O. p. natator; 3. O. p. coloratus; 4. O. p. texensis

Merriam and Goldman had recognized that a number of Central American species, including Oryzomys couesi and numerous forms with more limited distributions, are related to the marsh rice rat. O. couesi ranges north to southernmost Texas, where its distribution meets that of the marsh rice rat. In 1960, Raymond Hall argued that specimens from the contact zone were intermediate between the local forms of O. couesi and the marsh rice rat, and accordingly included the former in the marsh rice rat. While reporting on the ecology of Texan O. couesi in 1979, Benson and Gehlbach noted that populations of O. couesi and the marsh rice rat there were in fact distinct, with the latter being smaller and less brown and more gray in color; their karyotypes were also distinct. Since then, the two have generally been retained as distinct species, as supported by further research; a 1994 study even found the two to occur at some of the same places (in sympatry) in southern Texas and nearby Tamaulipas, Mexico.

In 1973, rice rats were discovered at Cudjoe Key in the Florida Keys, and in 1978 Spitzer and Lazell described this population as a new species, Oryzomys argentatus. The status of this form—either a distinct species or not even subspecifically distinct from O. palustris natator—has remained controversial since; the 2005 third edition of Mammal Species of the World does not recognize O. argentatus as a separate species, but acknowledges a need for further research. A 2005 study using microsatellite DNA found that Florida Keys rice rats exhibit low genetic variation and are significantly different from Everglades rice rats; the study concluded in favor of classifying the Keys rice rat as a "distinct vertebrate population". This population probably diverged from mainland rice rats about 2000 years ago.

Among the described subspecies, a 1989 morphometrical study by Humphrey and Setzer separated only two—O. p. natator from much of Florida (including O. p. coloratus, O. p. planirostris, O. p. sanibeli, and O. p. floridanus, as well as O. p. argentatus) and O. p. palustris from the rest of the range (including O. p. texensis). However, Whitaker and Hamilton in their 1998 book on the Mammals of the Eastern United States recognized O. p. planirostris and O. p. sanibeli as separate subspecies, but merged all others into O. p. palustris, and placed O. argentatus as a separate species; their classification was based on their emphasis of overwater gaps as agents of biological diversification and a critique of shortcomings in Humphrey and Setzer's study, not on a reanalysis of the data.

In 2010, Delton Hanson and colleagues published a study of the relationships among populations of Oryzomys on the basis of data from three genes—the mitochondrial gene cytochrome b (Cytb) and two nuclear markers, exon 1 of the interphotoreceptor retinoid-binding protein gene (Rbp3) and intron 2 of alcohol dehydrogenase gene 1 (Adh1-I2). The Cytb data placed all marsh rice rats studied sister to a clade containing various populations of O. couesi; the mean genetic distance between the two groups was 11.30%. The marsh rice rats fell into two main groups, differing on average by 6.05%, one containing animals from Mississippi, southwestern Tennessee, and further west, and the other including specimens from Alabama and further east. Within the eastern group, variation was only about 0.65%, though examples of the putative subspecies O. p. palustris, O. p. coloratus, O. p. sanibeli, and O. p. planirostris were all included. Data from both of the slower-evolving nuclear markers Rbp3 and Adh1-I2 also placed examples of Oryzomys in two main clades, but did not recover the western and eastern groups of the marsh rice rat as separate clades. In addition, Adh1-I2 placed a Costa Rican population within the marsh rice rat clade and some other southern Oryzomys specimens closer to the marsh rice rat than to the O. couesi group. The combined data supported the western and eastern clades within the marsh rice rat and placed the Costa Rican population marginally closer to the marsh rice rat than to O. couesi. Using the genetic species concept, the authors suggested that the western populations of the marsh rice rat be recognized as a separate species, O. texensis. They recommended further research in the Mississippi–Alabama–Tennessee region, where the ranges of the two meet.

=== Common names ===
Many common names have been proposed for the marsh rice rat. Early describers used "rice meadow-mouse" and "rice-field mouse" and in the early 1900s, name such as "rice rat", "marsh mouse", and "swamp rice rat" came into use. Some of the subspecies received their own common names, such as "Florida marsh mouse", "swimming rice rat", and "Central Florida rice rat" for O. p. natator; "Bangs' marsh mouse", "Cape Sable rice rat", and "Everglades rice rat" for O. p. coloratus; and "Texas rice rat" for O. p. texensis. The species is now usually known as the "marsh rice rat", although "marsh oryzomys" has also been in recent use. The Florida Keys form (O. p. argentatus) is known as the "silver rice rat".

== Description ==
Measurements of different populations of the marsh rice rat
Population	n	Total length	Tail length	Hindfoot length
O. p. palustris (New Jersey)	4	242 (237–245)	112 (109–116)	31 (30–31.5)
O. p. natator (Florida)	10	281.2 (246–318)	140.6 (122–173)	33.1 (28–37)
O. p. coloratus (Florida)	11	283.0 (250–326)	143.5 (123–171)	33.4 (31–38)
O. p. texensis (Texas)	8	242 (226–279)	120 (108–133)	29 (28.5–30.5)
O. p. planirostris (Florida)	14	247.5 (226–266)	129.6 (108–128)	31 (29–33)
O. p. sanibeli (Florida)	11	257.5 (233–274)	123.6 (111–138)	31.0 (29–33)
O. argentatus (Florida Keys)	2	251, 259	121, 132	32, 32
Measurements are all in millimeters and are in the form "average (minimum–maximum)", except those of the Florida Keys population. n=Number of specimens measured.

The marsh rice rat is a medium-sized rodent that looks much like the common black and brown rats, but has greater differences in color between the upper- and underparts. The fur is thick and short. The upperparts are generally gray to grayish brown, with the head a bit lighter, and are sharply delimited from the underparts, which are off-white, as are the feet. It has small cheek pouches. The ears are about the same color as the upperparts, but a patch of light hairs is in front of them. The tail is dark brown above and may be paler below. The guard hairs are long and have unpigmented, silvery tips. When rice rats swim, air is trapped in the fur, which increases buoyancy and reduces heat loss. As in most other oryzomyines, females have eight mammae.

The fore feet have four and the hind feet five digits. On the fore feet, the ungual tufts (tufts of hair on the digits) are absent. The hind feet are broad and have a short fifth digit. Many of the pads are reduced, as are the ungual tufts, but small interdigital webs are present. The Florida Keys form, P. o. argentatus, has even more reduced ungual tufts. Many of these traits are common adaptations to life in the water in oryzomyines.

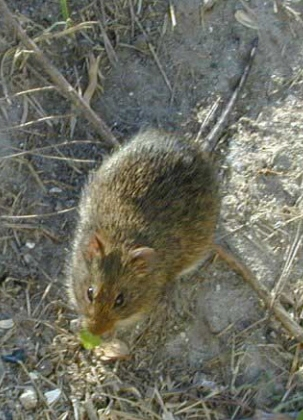
Marsh rice rats in much of Florida are more reddish than those elsewhere.

Some geographic variation in fur color occurs; western populations (P. o. texensis) are lighter than those from the east (nominate P. o. palustris), and Florida populations are generally more tawny or reddish than either, with those from southern Florida (P. o. coloratus) being brighter than those from the center of the state (P. o. natator). The Florida Keys form (P. o. argentatus) is silvery, and the two other Florida forms—P. o. planirostris and P. o. sanibeli—lack the reddish tones of mainland Florida populations and are instead grayish, resembling P. o. planirostris, or brownish (P. o. sanibeli). In 1989, Humphrey and Setzer reviewed variation in color among Florida populations. They found P. o. argentatus to be substantially lighter and P. o. planirostris and P. o. sanibeli to be somewhat darker than mainland populations, and P. o. argentatus to have a less yellow fur, but found no significant differences in redness. Substantial variation within populations also was found.

Total length is 226 to 305 mm (8.9 to 12.0 in), tail length 108 to 156 mm (4.3 to 6.1 in), hind foot length 28 to 37 mm (1.1 to 1.5 in), and body mass 40 to 80 g (1.4 to 2.8 oz), with males slightly larger than females. The largest individuals occur in Florida and along the Gulf Coast east of the Mississippi River delta.

The stomach has the characteristic pattern of sigmodontines (unilocular-hemiglandular); it is not split in two chambers by an incisura angularis and the front part (antrum) is covered by a glandular epithelium. The gall bladder is absent, a synapomorphy (shared-derived character) of Oryzomyini. The karyotype includes 56 chromosomes and a fundamental number of 60 chromosomal arms (2n = 56, FN = 60). The form of the sex chromosomes has been used to distinguish the marsh rice rat from Oryzomys couesi, but may be too variable among Oryzomys species to be useful in differentiating them. X chromosome inactivation occurs in the marsh rice rat, though the animal lacks LINE-1 retrotransposons, which have been suggested as components of the inactivation process. Mutants with fused or additional molars and with light fur have been recorded in laboratory colonies; the abnormal molars are apparently the result of a single autosomal recessive mutation. At about 50%, hematocrit (the proportion of red blood cells in the blood) is high in the marsh rice rat compared to other rodents; this may be an adaptation that enables the rice rat to increase oxygen capacity while swimming under water.

=== Male reproductive anatomy ===
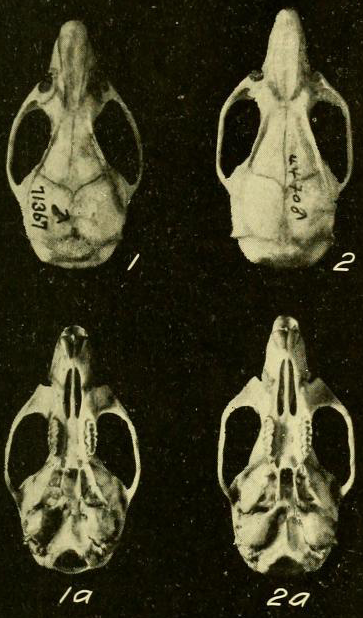
Skulls of the marsh rice rat, seen from above (top row) and below (bottom row), at the left is a South Carolina specimen of O. p. palustris, at the right is the holotype of O. p. coloratus from Cape Sable, Florida.

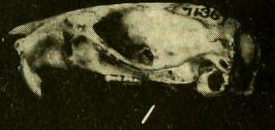
Skull from South Carolina, seen from the left.

The glans penis is long and robust, averaging 7.3 mm (0.29 in) long and 4.6 mm (0.18 in) broad, and the baculum (penis bone) is 6.6 mm (0.26 in) long. As is characteristic of the Sigmodontinae, the marsh rice rat has a complex penis, with the distal (far) end of the baculum ending in three digits. The central digit is notably larger than those at the sides. The outer surface of the penis is mostly covered by small spines, but a broad band of nonspinous tissue is seen. The papilla (nipple-like projection) on the dorsal (upper) side of the penis is covered with small spines, a character the marsh rice rat shares only with Oligoryzomys and Oryzomys couesi among oryzomyines examined. On the urethral process, located in the crater at the end of the penis, a fleshy process (the subapical lobule) is present; it is absent in all other oryzomyines with studied penes except O. couesi and Holochilus brasiliensis. The baculum is deeper than it is wide.

Some features of the accessory glands in the male genital region vary among oryzomyines. In the marsh rice rat, a single pair of preputial glands is present at the penis. As is usual for sigmodontines, two pairs of ventral prostate glands and a single pair of anterior and dorsal prostate glands exist. Part of the end of the vesicular gland is irregularly folded, not smooth as in most oryzomyines.

=== Skull ===
The marsh rice rat has a large, flattened skull with a short and broad rostrum. The nasal and premaxillary bones extend back beyond the point where the lacrimal, frontal, and maxillary bones meet. In P. o. planirostris, the rostrum is flatter than in mainland Florida forms, in which it is more convex, and the nasals are said to be relatively longer in P. o. argentatus. The zygomatic plate, the flattened front part of the zygomatic arch (cheekbone), is broad and develops a notch at its front end. The arches themselves are robust and contain small but distinct jugal bones. The sphenopalatine foramen, an opening in the side of the skull above the molars, is large; it is much smaller in O. couesi. The narrowest part of the region between the eyes is towards the front and the edges are lined by prominent shelves. The marsh rice rat has a narrow braincase lined by prominent ridges and a narrow interparietal bone. According to Goldman, Florida animals (P. o. coloratus and P. o. natator) generally have the largest and broadest skulls, and the western specimen (P. o. texensis) has a somewhat smaller and narrower skull than those from the east outside Florida (P. o. palustris). In P. o. argentatus, the skull is also relatively narrow.

The incisive foramina, openings in the front part of the palate, reach backward between the molars. The palate is long, extending substantially beyond the third molars. The back part, near the third molars, is usually perforated by prominent posterolateral palatal pits, which are recessed into fossae (depressions). The mesopterygoid fossa, the gap behind the end of the palate, is perforated by sphenopalatine vacuities, which are set far to the front. The condition of the arteries in the head is highly derived. The subsquamosal fenestra, an opening in the back part of the skull determined by the shape of the squamosal bone, is present. The squamosal lacks a suspensory process that contacts the tegmen tympani, the roof of the tympanic cavity, a defining character of oryzomyines. Some openings occur in the mastoid bone.

In the mandible, the mental foramen, an opening just before the first molar, opens sidewards, not upwards as in a few other oryzomyines. The upper and lower masseteric ridges, which anchor some of the chewing muscles, join at a point below the first molar and do not extend forward beyond that point. The capsular process, a raising of the bone of the back of the mandible that houses the back end of the incisor, is present, but not as large as in O. couesi.

=== Teeth ===
Mandible of a marsh rice rat from New Jersey, seen labially (from the outer side)

The dental formula is 1.0.0.31.0.0.3 × 2 = 16 (one upper and one lower incisor and three upper and three lower molars), as usual in muroid rodents. The upper incisors are well developed and strongly opisthodont, with the chewing edge located behind the vertical plane of the teeth. The molars are bunodont, with the cusps higher than the connecting crests, and brachydont, low-crowned, as in most other oryzomyines. Many accessory crests, including the mesoloph on the upper molars and the mesolophid on the lower molars, are present, another trait the marsh rice rat shares with most but not all other oryzomyines. The flexi and flexids (valleys between the cusps and crests) at the labial (outer) side of the molars are closed by cingula (ridges).

The upper molars have two longitudinal rows of cusps, not three as in the black and brown rats. The first and second upper molars are oval in form and the flexi do not extend to the midline of the molars. The anterocone, the front cusp of the upper first molar, is not divided in two by an indentation at its front (anteromedian flexus), but does display a hollow in the middle, the anteromedian fossette, which divides it into separate cuspules at the labial and lingual (inner) sides of the molar. A crest, the anteroloph, is present behind the labial cuspule, but in older animals, the cusps and the crest are united into a single structure by wear. In the third upper molar, the cusps at the back are reduced and scarcely distinguishable. As in most oryzomyines, the upper molars all have one root on the inner (lingual) side and two on the outer (labial) side; in addition, the first upper molar usually has another small labial root.

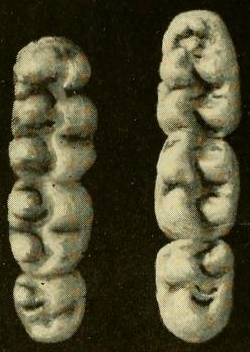
Upper (left) and lower (right) molars of a marsh rice rat from Virginia, with the front molars above

The first lower molar is rounded at the front end and the labial and lingual conules of the anteroconid, the frontmost cusp, are barely distinct. The second lower molar is elongated and has a crest, the anterolophid, before the two cusps that form the front edge of the molar in some other oryzomyines, the protoconid and metaconid. A distinct ridge (anterolabial cingulum) is at the outer front (anterolabial) edge of the molar, before the protoconid. The lower third molar is about as long as the second and also has an anterolophid, albeit a less well-defined one. The first lower molar has large roots at the front and back of the tooth and usually one or two smaller ones in between, at the labial and lingual side. The second and third lowers molars have either two roots, one labial and one lingual, or only one at the front, and another large root at the back.

=== Postcranial skeleton ===
As usual in oryzomyines, 12 ribs are present. The first rib articulates with both the last cervical (neck) and first thoracic (chest) vertebrae, a synapomorphy of the Sigmodontinae. The anapophyses, processes at the back of vertebrae, are absent from the fifth lumbar. Between the second and third caudal vertebrae, hemal arches (small bones) are present with a spinous back border. The entepicondylar foramen is absent, as in all members of the Sigmodontinae; if present, as in some other rodents, this foramen perforates the distal end of the humerus.

=== Physiology ===
In poor conditions, the weight of the adrenal gland may increase up to 200%, and rice rats are unable to conserve water well when dehydrated, and in water contaminated with oil, they swim less and their mortality increases. The median amount of radiation needed to kill a marsh rice rat is 5.25 Gy and the lethal dose of potassium cyanide is 7.20 mg/kg; both values are relatively low for cricetid rodents. In one study, wild rice rats in radioactively contaminated areas did not show signs of disease. Exposure to more daylight and higher food availability cause increased development of the gonads in both adult and juvenile rice rats. When the pineal gland is removed or melatonin is administered in male rice rats, the testes are reduced and tend to regress into the body.

== Distribution and habitat ==
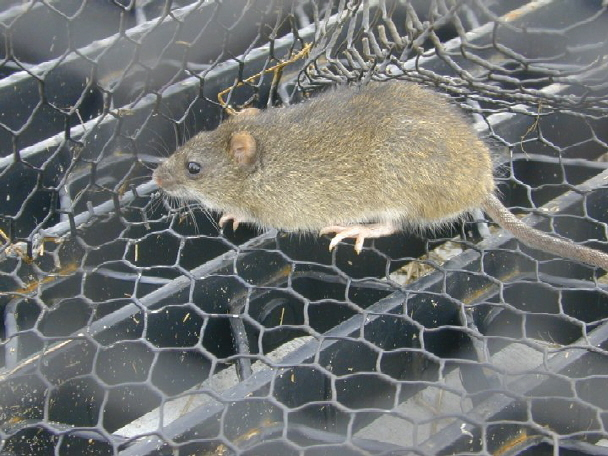
A marsh rice rat walking on mesh in Paynes Prairie, Florida

The marsh rice rat currently occurs in much of the eastern and southern United States, northeast to southern New Jersey, and south to southeastern Texas and far northeastern Tamaulipas, Mexico. The northernmost records in the interior United States are in eastern Oklahoma, southeastern Kansas, southern Missouri and Illinois, and the southern half of Kentucky, but the species is absent in much of the Appalachians. Fossils of the marsh rice rat are known from Rancholabrean (late Pleistocene, less than 300,000 years ago) deposits in Florida and Georgia and remains referred to the extinct subspecies O. p. fossilis are from the Wisconsinan and Sangamonian of Texas and Illinoian and Sangamonian of Kansas. In the Florida Keys, rice rats occur on most of the Lower Keys, but are absent from the Upper Keys, which are of a different geological origin and were probably never connected to the mainland. The western and eastern Cytb clades within the marsh rice rat may represent expansions from different glacial refugia which the species was restricted to during a glacial period.

Cave and archeological remains indicate that the range of the marsh rice rat has extended substantially further north and west earlier in the Holocene, into central Texas, eastern Nebraska, southwestern Iowa, central Illinois, southern Indiana, southern Ohio, West Virginia, and southwestern Pennsylvania. Most northern archeological sites date from about 1000 CE and are associated with corn cultivation, but in some older cave sites the rice rat is found with the extinct giant armadillo Dasypus bellus, suggesting warm climatic conditions. Perhaps a warm period during the Quaternary enabled the rice rat to disperse northward and when the climate cooled, relict populations were able to survive in the north as commensals in corn-cultivating Native American communities. Some subfossil animals are slightly larger than living marsh rice rats, possibly because environmental constraints were relaxed in commensal populations.

In Tamaulipas and southern Texas, the ranges of the marsh rice rat and the related Oryzomys couesi meet; in parts of Kenedy, Willacy and Cameron counties, Texas, and in far northeastern Tamaulipas, the two are sympatric (occur in the same places). In experimental conditions, they fail to interbreed and genetic analysis yields no evidence of gene flow or hybridization in the wild. Compared to O. couesi, the marsh rice rat shows less genetic variability within but more between populations in the contact zone, probably because the species is restricted to isolated populations near the coast.

The marsh rice rat occurs in several habitats, ranging from coastal salt marshes to mountain streams and clearings. It is semiaquatic, spending much time in the water, and usually occurs in wetland habitats. It prefers areas where the ground is covered with grasses and sedges, which protect it from predators. In southern Illinois, marsh rice rats are more likely to occur in wetlands with more herbaceous cover, visual obstruction, and nearby grasslands. The species also occurs in drier uplands, which serve as sinks for young, dispersing animals and as refuges during high tide. Rice rats are adept overwater dispersers; studies on islands off Virginia's Delmarva Peninsula show that they readily cross 300-m (1000 ft) channels between islands.

== Behavior and ecology ==
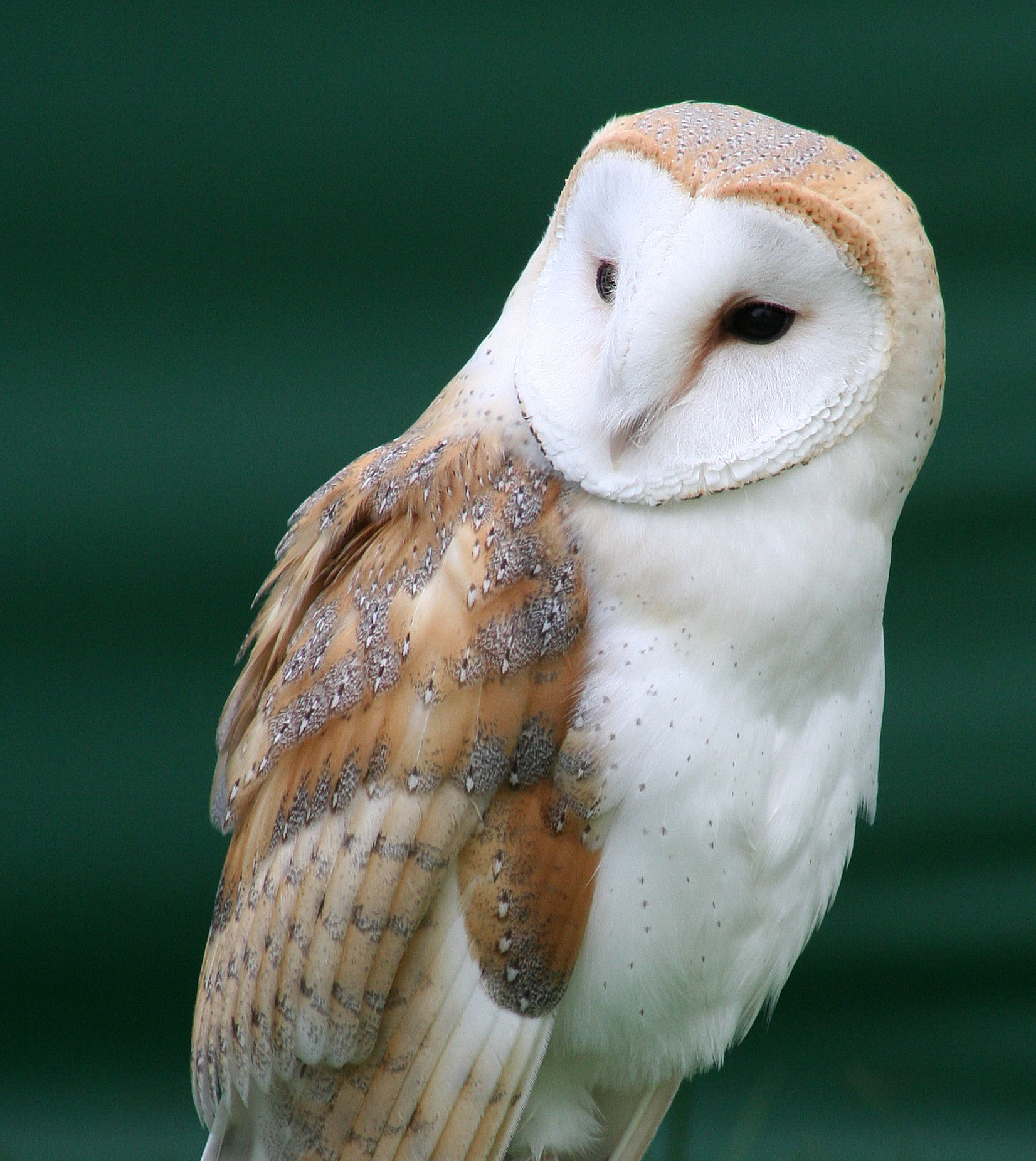
The barn owl is an important predator of the marsh rice rat.

Marsh rice rats are active during the night, so are rarely seen, although they may be among the most common small mammals in part of their range. They build nests of sedge and grass, about 13 cm (5 in) large, which are placed under debris, near shrubs, in short burrows, or high in aquatic vegetation. They may also use old nests of marsh wrens (Cistothorus palustris), red-winged blackbirds (Agelaius phoeniceus), muskrats (Ondatra zibethicus) or round-tailed muskrats (Neofiber alleni). Marsh rice rats sometimes make large runways or dig burrows. They are accomplished and willing swimmers, easily swimming more than 10 m (33 ft) under water, and often seek safety in the water when alarmed. Rice rats in the Florida Keys occasionally climb in vegetation, but never higher than 90 cm (3.0 ft). Marsh rice rats are very clean and extensively groom themselves, perhaps to keep their fur water-repellent. They are aggressive towards conspecifics and emit high-pitched squeaks while fighting. In dense vegetation, their perceptual range (the distance from which an animal can detect a patch of suitable habitat) is less than 10 m (33 ft). When released outside of their natural wetland habitat, marsh rice rats generally move either upwind or downwind (anemotaxis), perhaps to move in a straight line, which is an efficient strategy to find suitable habitat.

Many animals prey on marsh rice rats. The barn owl (Tyto alba) is among the most important; one study found that 97.5% of vertebrate remains in barn owl pellets were marsh rice rats. Other predators include birds such as marsh hawks (Circus cyaneus), and barred owls (Strix varia); snakes such as cottonmouths (Agkistrodon piscivorus); alligators (Alligator mississippiensis); and carnivorans like raccoons (Procyon lotor), red foxes (Vulpes vulpes), American mink (Neogale vison), weasels (Mustela and Neogale sp.), and striped skunks (Mephitis mephitis). Many parasites have been recorded on the marsh rice rat, including various ticks and mites, lice, and fleas among external parasites and many nematodes and digeneans, a pentastomid, and several coccidians among internal parasites (see Parasites of the marsh rice rat).

In Florida, marsh rice rats may be eaten by some growth stage of invasive snakes such as Burmese pythons, reticulated pythons, Southern African rock pythons, Central African rock pythons, boa constrictors, yellow anacondas, Bolivian anacondas, dark-spotted anacondas, and green anacondas.

Periodontitis, a bacterial disease affecting the jaws, is particularly virulent in marsh rice rats; the animal has been proposed as a model for research on the disease in humans. The identity of the bacterial agent remains unknown. Vitamin E, fluoride, and iodide protect against bone loss associated with this disease in the rice rat and a high-sucrose diet increases the severity of periodontitis. A case of kyphosis has been observed in a North Carolina marsh rice rat.

=== Population dynamics ===
The population density of the marsh rice rat usually does not reach 10 per ha (4 per acre). The weather may influence population dynamics; in the Everglades, densities may exceed 200 per ha (80 per acre) when flooding concentrates populations on small islands, In the Florida Keys, population density is less than 1 per ha (0.4 per acre). On Breton Island, Louisiana, perhaps an atypical habitat, home ranges in males average about 0.37 hectares (0.91 acres) and in females about 0.23 hectares (0.57 acres). A study in Florida found male home ranges to average 0.25 hectares (0.62 acres) and female 0.33 hectares (0.82 acres).

Population size is usually largest during the summer and declines during winter, although populations in Texas and Louisiana may be more seasonally stable. Animals also often lose weight during winter. Population size varies dramatically from year to year in southern Texas. In coastal Mississippi, storms probably do not cause the population to decline substantially, and in Texas, inundation of its habitat did not significantly influence population density. However, in Mississippi, flooding did cause a marked decline in rice rat abundance.

In the northern part of its range, the species often occurs with the meadow vole (Microtus pennsylvanicus), but no evidence shows they compete with each other. In the south, the hispid cotton rat (Sigmodon hispidus) and the rice rat regularly occur together; water levels are known to influence relative abundance of these two species in Florida. The cotton rat is mainly active during the day, which may help differentiate its niche from that of the rice rat.

=== Diet ===
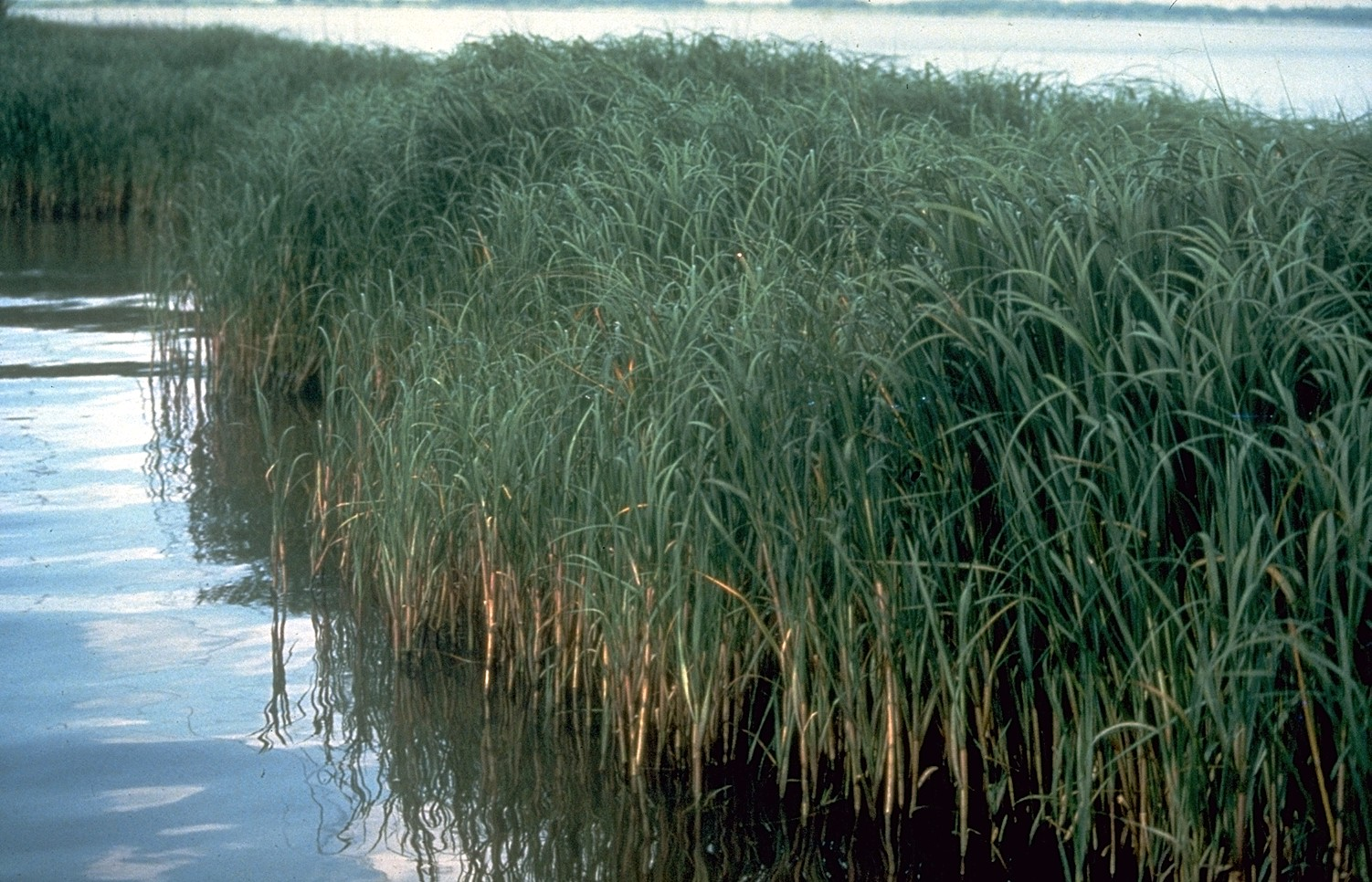
Spartina alterniflora is eaten by the marsh rice rat

The marsh rice rat takes both vegetable and animal food, and is more carnivorous than most small rodents are; dominant food items vary seasonally. Plants eaten include species of Spartina, Salicornia, Tripsacum, and Elymus, among others; it mainly eats seeds and succulent parts. It prefers Spartina alterniflora that has been fertilized with nitrogen and mainly eats the inner tissue of the stem, perhaps because nitrogen-fertilized plants contain much less dimethylsulfoniopropionate in their inner tissues. The marsh rice rat was a major pest on rice plantations, feeding on the rice when it was newly planted. It also eats the fungus Endogone at times.

Animals that are important to the marsh rice rat's diet include insects, fiddler crabs, and snails, but the species is known to eat many other animals, including fish, clams, and juvenile Graptemys and Chrysemys turtles. They scavenge on carcasses of muskrats, deermice, and sparrows, and may be the most important predator on eggs and young of the marsh wren. Rice rats also eat eggs and young of the seaside sparrow (Ammodramus maritimus) and are aggressive towards the sparrow, apparently leading it to avoid nesting in Juncus in a seaside salt marsh in Florida. On islands in North Carolina, rice rats consume eggs of Forster's tern (Sterna forsteri). They have been observed preying on alligator eggs in Georgia.

Laboratory studies have found that rice rats assimilate 88% to 95% of the energy in their food. They lose weight when fed on Spartina, fiddler crabs, or sunflower seeds alone, but a diet consisting of several of those items or of mealworms is adequate to maintain weight. In an experiment, marsh rice rats did not show hoarding behavior, but wild rice rats have been observed carrying food to a nest. Even when they live in uplands, they mostly eat water plants and animals, although they consume some upland plants.

=== Reproduction and lifecycle ===
Breeding occurs mostly during the summer. Some studies report that breeding ceases entirely during the winter, but winter breeding occurs as far north as Virginia, primarily because photoperiod influences their circadian rhythm which determines breeding. In both Texas and Virginia, variation in reproductive activity in females is less than in males. In the south of its range, animals may breed less when the summer is at its warmest. The duration of the estrous cycle ranges from 6 to 9 days, with an average of 7.72 days. Estrus occurs again after a litter is born. Copulatory behavior in the marsh rice rat is similar to that in laboratory brown rats. Before mating starts, "the male pursues the running female from behind." The male then repeatedly mounts and dismounts the female; not all mounts result in an ejaculation. Penetrations only last for about 250 ms, but during mating, the penetrations and the intervals between them become longer. Even when a male is satiated after mating, it is able to copulate again when a new female is introduced (the Coolidge effect). Partly because of resistance by the female, the frequency of ejaculation during mating is rather low in marsh rice rats as compared to laboratory rats, hamsters, and deermice.

Body masses reported at different ages
Age (days)	Body mass in g (oz)
10	8–17 (0.3–0.6)
20	18–27 (0.6–1.0)
40	27–40 (1.0–1.4)
60	40–60 (1.4–2.1)
120	50–80 (1.8–2.8)

After a gestation of about 25 days, three to five young are usually born, although litter sizes vary from one to seven. Females may have up to six litters a year. Newborns weigh 3 to 4 g (about 0.11 to 0.14 oz) and are blind and almost naked. About as many males as females are born. The external ears (pinnae) soon unfold and on the first day, claws are visible and the young emit high-pitched squeaks. On the second day, they are able to crawl, and during the third to fifth days, the whiskers and eyelids develop. On the two subsequent days, the mammae and incisors become visible and the animals become more active. Between the 8th and 11th days, the eyes open, the fur develops, and the young begin to take solid food. Weaning occurs on the 11th to 20th day, according to different studies. Considerable variation is reported in body masses at different ages, perhaps because of geographic variation. Sexual activity commences when the animals are about 50 to 60 days old. In the wild, rice rats usually live for less than a year; one study suggested that the average lifespan is only 7 months.

== Human interactions ==
The marsh rice rat is generally of little importance to humans, which is perhaps why it is not as well studied as some other North American rodents. In 1931, Arthur Svihla noted that virtually no information had been published on the habits and life history of the marsh rice rat since the 1854 publication of Audubon and Bachman's description. Writing on Everglades mammals, Thomas E. Lodge notes that although the name "rat" may associate it unpleasantly with the introduced black and brown rats, its appearance is more endearing, even cute. J. S. Steward proposed the marsh rice rat as a model organism in 1951 to study certain infections to which other rodents used at the time are not susceptible. The marsh rice rat is quite susceptible to periodontitis and has been used as a model system for the study of that disease.

The marsh rice rat is the primary host of the Bayou virus (BAYV), the second-most common agent of hantavirus infections in the United States. About 16% of animals are infected and the virus is most prevalent in old, heavy males. The virus may be transmitted among rice rats through bites inflicted during fights. It is also present in rice rat saliva and urine, and human infections may occur because of contact with these excreta. Two related hantaviruses, Catacama virus and Playa de Oro virus, are known from Oryzomys couesi in Honduras and western Mexico, respectively. An arenavirus normally associated with woodrats (Neotoma) has also been found in Florida marsh rice rats. Antibodies against Borrelia burgdorferi, the bacterium that causes Lyme disease in the United States, have been found in marsh rice rats in Virginia, Maryland, North Carolina, and Tennessee. Another pathogenic bacterium, Bartonella, is known from Georgia marsh rice rats.

The 2016 IUCN Red List assesses the conservation status of the marsh rice rat as "Least Concern", because it is a common, widespread, and stable species without major threats that occurs in several protected areas. The Florida Keys form is rare and in decline and is threatened by competition with the black rat, predation by domestic cats, habitat loss, and loss of genetic variation; it is considered endangered. At the northern edge of its distribution, the marsh rice rat is listed as threatened in Illinois, and whether it persists in Pennsylvania is unclear; it probably formerly occurred in tidal marshes on the Delaware River. In Illinois, its population may have regenerated because wetlands have been developed to protect waterfowl and shorebirds and because suitable wetlands often develop in abandoned coal-mining operations. A 2001 study projected that climate change would reduce the range of the marsh rice rat in Texas, where it is now common, but may become threatened by habitat loss in the future. A study at the Paducah Gaseous Diffusion Plant found that rice rats accumulate more polychlorinated biphenyls, but less heavy metal than white-footed mice (Peromyscus leucopus).

== Literature cited ==
- Abuzeineh, A.A., Owen, R.D., McIntyre, N.E., Dick, C.W., Strauss, R.E. and Holsomback, T. 2007. Response of marsh rice rat (Oryzomys palustris) to inundation of habitat (subscription required). The Southwestern Naturalist 52(1):75–78.
- Allen, J.A. 1894. On the mammals of Aransas County, Texas, with descriptions of new forms of Lepus and Oryzomys. Bulletin of the American Museum of Natural History 6:165–198.
- Audubon, J.J. and Bachman, J. 1854. The quadrupeds of North America. Vol. III. New York: V. G. Audubon, 348 pp.
- Baird, S.F. 1857. Mammals: General report upon the zoology of the several Pacific railroad routes. Reports of explorations and surveys to ascertain the most practicable and economical route for a railroad from the Mississippi River to the Pacific Ocean (Senate executive document 78, Washington, D.C.) 8(1):1–757.
- Bangs, O. 1898. The land mammals of peninsular Florida and the coast region of Georgia. Proceedings of the Boston Society of Natural History 28:157–235.
- Beiraghi, S., Rosen, S., Wright, K., Spuller, R. and Beck, F.M. 1988. Effect of stannous fluoride and iodine on root caries and bone loss in rats. Ohio Journal of Science 88(3):99–100.
- Benson, D.E. and Gehlbach, F.R. 1979. Ecological and taxonomic notes on the rice rat (Oryzomys couesi) in Texas (subscription required). Journal of Mammalogy 60(1):225–228.
- Bloch, C.P. and Rose, R.K. 2005. Population dynamics of Oryzomys palustris and Microtus pennsylvanicus in Virginia tidal marshes (subscription required). Northeastern Naturalist 12(3):295–306.
- Brunjes, J.H., IV and Webster, W.D. 2003. Marsh rice rat, Oryzomys palustris, predation on Forster's tern, Sterna forsteri, eggs in coastal North Carolina. Canadian Field-Naturalist 117(4):654–657.
- Cameron, G.N. and Scheel, D. Getting warmer: Effect of global climate change on distribution of rodents in Texas (subscription required). Journal of Mammalogy 82(3):652–680.
- Cantrell, M.A., Carstens, B.C. and Wichman, H.A. 2009. X chromosome inactivation and Xist evolution in a rodent lacking LINE-1 activity. PLoS ONE 4(7):e6252; 1–9.
- Carleton, M.D. and Arroyo-Cabrales, J. 2009. Review of the Oryzomys couesi complex (Rodentia: Cricetidae: Sigmodontinae) in Western Mexico. Bulletin of the American Museum of Natural History 331:94–127.
- Carleton, M.D. and Musser, G.G. 1984. Muroid rodents. Pp. 289–379 in Anderson. S. and Jones, J.K. Jr. (eds.). Orders and families of Recent mammals of the world. John Wiley and Sons, New York, 686 pp.
- Carleton, M.D. and Musser, G.G. 1989. Systematic studies of oryzomyine rodents (Muridae, Sigmodontinae): a synopsis of Microryzomys. Bulletin of the American Museum of Natural History 191:1–83.
- Cassola, F. (2017) [errata version of 2016 assessment]. "Oryzomys palustris". IUCN Red List of Threatened Species. 2016 e.T42675A115200837.
- Chamberlain, M.J. and Leopold, B.D. 2003. Effects of a flood on relative abundance and diversity of small mammals in a regenerating bottomland hardwood forest (subscription required). The Southwestern Naturalist 48(2):306–309.
- Chapman, F.M. 1893. Description of a new subspecies of Oryzomys from the Gulf States. Bulletin of the American Museum of Natural History 5:43–46.
- Childs, H.E. Jr. and Cosgrove, G.E. 1966. A study of pathological conditions in wild rodents in radioactive areas (subscription required). American Midland Naturalist 76(2):309–324.
- Chu, Y.-K., Owen, R.D., Sánchez-Hernández, C., Romero-Almarez, M. de L. and Jonsson, C.B. 2008. Genetic characterization and phylogeny of a hantavirus from Western Mexico (subscription required). Virus Research 131:180–188.
- Cohen, M.E. and Meyer, D.M. 1993. Effect of dietary vitamin E supplement and rotational stress on alveolar bone loss in rice rats (subscription required). Archives of Oral Biology 38(7):601–606.
- Dalquest, W.W. 1962. The Good Creek Formation, Pleistocene of Texas, and its fauna (subscription required). Journal of Paleontology 36(3):568–582.
- Dalquest, W.W. 1965. New Pleistocene formation and local fauna from Hardeman County, Texas (subscription required). Journal of Paleontology 39(1):63–79.
- Dewsbury, D.A. 1970. Copulatory behaviour of rice rats (Oryzomys palustris) (subscription required). Animal Behaviour 18:266–275.
- Durden, L.A. and Kollars, T.M. Jr. 1997. The fleas (Siphonaptera) of Tennessee. Journal of Vector Ecology 22(1):13–22.
- Edmonds, K.E. Jr., Riggs, L. and Stetson, M.H. 2003. Food availability and photoperiod affect reproductive development and maintenance in the marsh rice rat (Oryzomys palustris) (subscription required). Physiology & Behavior 78:41–49.
- Eliot, D.G. 1905. A checklist of mammals of the North American continent, the West Indies and the neighboring seas. Field Columbian Museum Zoological Series 6:1–761.
- Esher, R.J., Wolfe, J.L. and Layne, J.N. 1978. Swimming behavior of rice rats (Oryzomys palustris) and cotton rats (Sigmodon hispidus) (subscription required). Journal of Mammalogy 59(3):551–558.
- Eubanks, B.W., Hellgren, E.C., Nawrot, J.R. and Bluett, R.D. 2011. Habitat associations of the marsh rice rat (Oryzomys palustris) in freshwater wetlands of southern Illinois (subscription required). Journal of Mammalogy 92(3):552–560.
- Forys, E.A. and Dueser, R.D. 1993. Inter-island movements of rice rats (Oryzomys palustris) (subscription required). American Midland Naturalist 130(2):408–412.
- Goldman, E.A. 1918. The rice rats of North America. North American Fauna 43:1–100.
- Goodyear, N.C. 1987. Distribution and habitat of the silver rice rat, Oryzomys argentatus (subscription required). Journal of Mammalogy 68(3):692–695.
- Goodyear, N.C. 1991. Taxonomic status of the silver rice rat, Oryzomys argentatus (subscription required). Journal of Mammalogy 72(4):723–730.
- Goodyear, N.C. 1992. Spatial overlap and dietary selection of native rice rats and exotic black rats (subscription required). Journal of Mammalogy 73(1):186–200.
- Hall, E.R. 1960. Oryzomys couesi only subspecifically different from the marsh rice rat, Oryzomys palustris (subscription required). The Southwestern Naturalist 5(3):171–173.
- Hamilton, W.J. Jr. 1955. Two new rice rats (Genus Oryzomys) from Florida. Proceedings of the Biological Society of Washington 68:83–86.
- Hanson, J.D., Indorf, J.L., Swier, V.J. and Bradley, R.D. 2010. Molecular divergence within the Oryzomys palustris complex: evidence for multiple species (subscription required). Journal of Mammalogy 91(2):336–347.
- Harlan, R. 1837. Description of a new species of Quadruped, of the order Rodentia, inhabiting the United States. The American Journal of Science 31(2):385–386.
- Hershkovitz, P.M. 1987. First South American record of Coues' marsh rice rat, Oryzomys couesi (subscription required). Journal of Mammalogy 68(1):152–154.
- Hibbard, C.W. 1955. The Jinglebob interglacial (Sangamon?) fauna from Kansas and its climatic significance. Contributions from the Museum of Paleontology, University of Michigan 12:179–228.
- Hofmann, J.E., Gardner, J.E. and Moris, M.J. 1990. Distribution, abundance, and habitat of the marsh rice rat (Oryzomys palustris) in southern Illinois. Transactions of the Illinois State Academy of Science 83(3–4):162–180.
- Hooper, E.T. and Musser, G.G. 1964. The glans penis in Neotropical cricetines (Family Muridae) with comments on classification of muroid rodents. Miscellaneous Publications of the University of Michigan Museum of Zoology 123:1–57.
- Humphrey, S.R. and Setzer, H.W. 1989. Geographic variation and taxonomic revision of rice rats (Oryzomys palustris and O. argentatus) of the United States (subscription required). Journal of Mammalogy 70(3):557–570.
- Hunt, R.H. and Ogden, J.J. 1991. Selected aspects of the nesting ecology of American alligators in the Okefenokee Swamp (subscription required). Journal of Herpetology 25(4):448–453.
- Kays, R.W. and Wilson, D.E. 2000. Mammals of North America. Princeton and Oxford: Princeton University Press, 240 pp. ISBN 0-691-07012-1
- Kollars, T.M. Jr., Ourth, D.D., Lockey, T.D. and Markowski, D. 1996. IgG antibodies to Borrelia burgdorferi in rodents in Tennessee. Journal of Spirochetal and Tick-Borne Diseases 3(3–4):130–134.
- Kosoy, M.Y., Elliott, L.H., Ksiazek, T.G., Fulhorst, C.F., Rollin, P.E., Childs, J.E., Mills, J.N., Maupin, G.O. and Peters, C.J. 1996. Prevalence of antibodies to arenaviruses in rodents from the southern and western United States: evidence for an arenavirus associated with the genus Neotoma (subscription required). American Journal of Tropical Medicine and Hygiene 54(6):570–576.
- Kosoy, M.Y., Regnery, R.L., Tzianabos, T., Marston, E.L., Jones, D.C., Green, D., Maupin, G.O., Olson, J.G. and Childs, J.E. 1997. Distribution, diversity, and host specificity of Bartonella in rodents from the southeastern United States. American Journal of Tropical Medicine and Hygiene 57(5):578–588.
- Kruchek, B.L. 2004. Use of tidal marsh and upland habitats by the marsh rice rat (Oryzomys palustris) (subscription required). Journal of Mammalogy 85(3):569–575.
- Leopard, E.P. 1979. Periodontitis. Animal model: periodontitis in the rice rat (Oryzomys palustris). American Journal of Pathology 96(2):643–646.
- Lodge, T.E. 2005. The Everglades handbook: understanding the ecosystem. 2nd edition. CRC Press, 302 pp. ISBN 978-1-56670-614-8
- Loxterman, J.L., Moncrief, N.D., Dueser, R.D., Carlson, C.R. and Pagels, J.F. 1998. Dispersal abilities and genetic population structure of insular and mainland Oryzomys palustris and Peromyscus leucopus (subscription required). Journal of Mammalogy 79(1):66–77.
- McIntyre, N.E., Chu, Y.-K., Owen, R.D., Abuzeineh, A., de la Sancha, N., Dick, C.W., Holsomback, T. Nisbett, R.A. and Jonsson, C. 2005. A longitudinal study of Bayou virus, hosts, and habitat. American Journal of Tropical Medicine and Hygiene 73:1043–1049.
- Merriam, C.H. 1901. Synopsis of the rice rats (genus Oryzomys) of the United States and Mexico. Proceedings of the Washington Academy of Sciences 3:273–295.
- Merritt, J.F. 1987. Guide to the mammals of Pennsylvania. University of Pittsburgh Press, 408 pp. ISBN 978-0-8229-5393-7
- Milazzo, M.L., Cajimat, M.N., Hanson, J.D., Bradley, R.D., Quintana, M., Sherman, C., Velásquez, R.T. and Fulhorst, C.F. 2006. Catacamas virus, a hantaviral species naturally associated with Oryzomys couesi (Coues' oryzomys) in Honduras. American Journal of Tropical Medicine and Hygiene 75(5):1003–1010.
- Miller, G.S. Jr. and Kellogg, R. 1955. List of North American Recent mammals. United States National Museum Bulletin 205:i–xii+1–954.
- Musser, G.G. and Carleton, M.D. 2005. Superfamily Muroidea. Pp. 894–1531 in Wilson, D.E. and Reeder, D.M. (eds.). Mammal Species of the World: a taxonomic and geographic reference. 3rd ed. Baltimore: The Johns Hopkins University Press, 2 vols., 2142 pp. ISBN 978-0-8018-8221-0
- Negus, N.C., Gould, E. and Chipman, R.K. 1961. Ecology of the rice rat, Oryzomys palustris (Harlan), on Breton Island, Gulf of Mexico, with a critique of the critical stress theory. Tulane Studies in Zoology 8(4):93–123.
- Nesmith, C.C. and Cox, J. 1985. Red-winged blackbird nest usurpation by rice rats in Florida and Mexico. Florida Field Naturalist 13(2):35–36.
- O'Farrell, T.P. and Dilley, J.V. 1975. A comparison of radiation response, cyanide toxicity and sulfur transferase activity in native North American rodents (subscription required). Comparative Biochemistry and Biophysiology 50B:443–447.
- Oliver, J.H., Magnarelli, L.A., Hutcheson, H.J. and Anderson, J.F. 1999. Ticks and antibodies to Borrelia burgdorferi from mammals at Cape Hatteras, NC and Assateague Island, MD and VA (abstract only). Journal of Medical Entomology 36(5):578–587.
- Otte, M.L., Wilson, G., Morris, J.T. and Moran, B.M. 2004. Dimethylsulphoniopropionate (DMSP) and related compounds in higher plants (subscription required). Journal of Experimental Botany 55(404):1919–1925.
- Oz, H.S. and Puleo, D.A. 2011. Animal models for periodontal disease. Journal of Biomedicine and Biotechnology 2011:754857.
- Post, W. 1981. The influence of rice rats Oryzomys palustris on the habitat use of the seaside sparrow Ammospiza maritima (subscription required). Behavioral Ecology and Sociobiology 9(1):35–40.
- Reid, F.A. 2006. A Field Guide to Mammals of North America, 4th ed. Boston: Houghton Mifflin Co. ISBN 978-0-395-93596-5
- Richards, R.L. 1980. Rice rat (Oryzomys cf. palustris) remains from southern Indiana caves. Proceedings of the Indiana Academy of Sciences 89:425–431.
- Rose, R.K. and McGurk, S.W. 2006. Year-round diet of the marsh rice rat, Oryzomys palustris, in Virginia tidal marshes. Virginia Journal of Science 57(3):115–121.
- Schmidly, D.J. and Davis, W.B. 2004. The mammals of Texas. 2nd edition. University of Texas Press, 501 pp. ISBN 978-0-292-70241-7
- Schmidt, C.A. and Engstrom, M.D. 1994. Genic variation and systematics of rice rats (Oryzomys palustris species group) in southern Texas and northeastern Tamaulipas, Mexico (subscription required). Journal of Mammalogy 75(4):914–928.
- Schooley, R.L. and Branch, L.C. 2005. Limited perceptual range and anemotaxis in marsh rice rats Oryzomys palustris (subscription required). Acta Theriologica 50(1):59–66.
- Schwartz, C.W. and Schwartz, E.R. 2001. The wild mammals of Missouri. University of Missouri Press, 368 pp. ISBN 978-0-8262-1359-4
- Shklair, I.L. and Ralls, S.A. 1988. Periodontopathic micro-organisms in the rice rat (Oryzomys palustris). Microbios 55:25–31. PMID 3060702 (abstract only)
- Smith, P.N., Cobb, G.P., Harper, F.M., Adair, B.M. and McMurry, S.T. 2002. Comparison of white-footed mice and rice rats as biomonitors of polychlorinated biphenyl and metal contamination (subscription required). Environmental Pollution 119(2):261–268.
- Sofaer, J.A. and Shaw, J.H. 1971. The genetics and development of fused and supernumerary molars in the rice rat. Journal of Embryology and Experimental Morphology 26(1):99–109.
- Spitzer, N.C. and Lazell, J.D. Jr. 1978. A new rice rat (genus Oryzomys) from Florida's Lower Keys (subscription required). Journal of Mammalogy 59(4):787–792.
- Steward, J.S. 1951. The swamp rice rat (Oryzomys palustris natator) as a possible laboratory animal for special purposes (subscription required). The Journal of Hygiene 49(4):427–429.
- Stone, W. and Cram, W.E. 1903. American animals: a popular guide to the mammals of North America north of Mexico, with intimate biographies of the more familiar species. Doubleday, Page & Company, 316 pp.
- Svihla, A. 1931. Life history of the Texas rice rat (Oryzomys palustris texensis) (subscription required). Journal of Mammalogy 12(3):238–242.
- Voss, R.S. and Linzey, A.V. 1981. Comparative gross morphology of male accessory glands among Neotropical Muridae (Mammalia: Rodentia) with comments on systematic implications. Miscellaneous Publications of the University of Michigan Museum of Zoology 159:1–41.
- Wang, Y., Williams, D.A. and Gaines, M.S. 2005. Evidence for a recent genetic bottleneck in the endangered Florida Keys silver rice rat (Oryzomys argentatus) revealed by microsatellite DNA analyses (subscription required). Conservation Genetics 6:575–585.
- Webster, W.D. 1987. Kyphosis in the marsh rice rat (Oryzomys palustris). Journal of Wildlife Diseases 23(1):171–172.
- Weksler, M. 2006. Phylogenetic relationships of oryzomyine rodents (Muroidea: Sigmodontinae): separate and combined analyses of morphological and molecular data. Bulletin of the American Museum of Natural History 296:1–149.
- Weksler, M., Percequillo, A.R. and Voss, R.S. 2006. Ten new genera of oryzomyine rodents (Cricetidae: Sigmodontinae). American Museum Novitates 3537:1–29.
- Whitaker, J.O. and Hamilton, W.J. 1998. Mammals of the Eastern United States. Cornell University Press, 583 pp. ISBN 978-0-8014-3475-4
- Winkler, A.J. 1990. Small mammals from a Holocene sequence in central Texas and their paleoenvironmental implications (subscription required). The Southwestern Naturalist 35(2):199–205.
- Wolfe, J.L. 1982. Oryzomys palustris. Mammalian Species 176:1–5.
- Wolfe, J.L. and Esher, R.J. 1981. Effects of crude oil on swimming behavior and survival in the rice rat (subscription required). Environmental Research 26:486–489.
