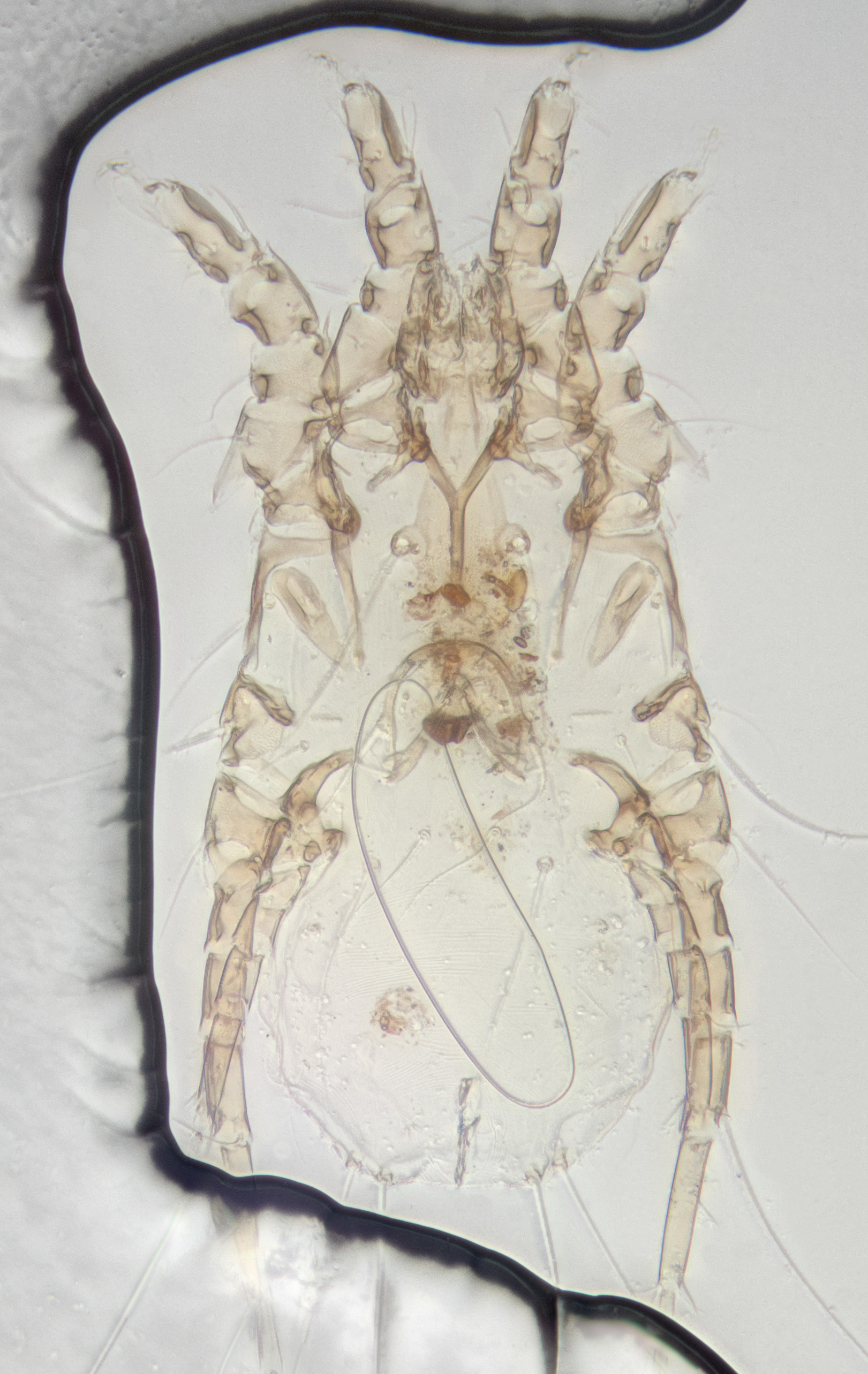
- Holotype in Te Papa's collection

Scientific classification
- Kingdom: Animalia
- Phylum: Arthropoda
- Subphylum: Chelicerata
- Class: Arachnida
- Order: Sarcoptiformes
- Family: Analgidae
- Genus: Kiwialges
- Species: K. haastii

Binomial name
- Kiwialges haastii Bishop, 1985

= Kiwialges haastii =

Feather mite from the great spotted kiwi

Kiwalges haastii is a species of New Zealand feather mite in the superfamily Analgoidea, known only from the great spotted kiwi (Apteryx haastii), from which it derives its name.

== Taxonomy ==
The genus Kiwalges was erected by Gaud and Atyeo in 1970 to contain two species of kiwi feather mites, K. palametrichus and K. phalagotrichus. These species are found on brown kiwi (Apteryx australis), little spotted kiwi (A. owenii), and great spotted kiwi (A. haastii). Gaud and Atyeo noted that these species, and two others they described in the genus Kiwilichus, were not host specific so did not shed much light on the evolutionary origins of the different kiwi species, but no other species in this subfamily had been found on any other ratite birds. Since then feather mites have been found on most ratite species.

In 1985, Dallas Bishop described a fifth species of kiwi feather mite from specimens all found on A. haastii. Six came from a kiwi collected near the Totara River, 20 from a Smyth River specimen, and two more from Madman Creek, all in Westland. She named the species Kiwalges haastii, using the same specific epithet as the great spotted kiwi, which honours Canterbury Museum director Julius von Haast.

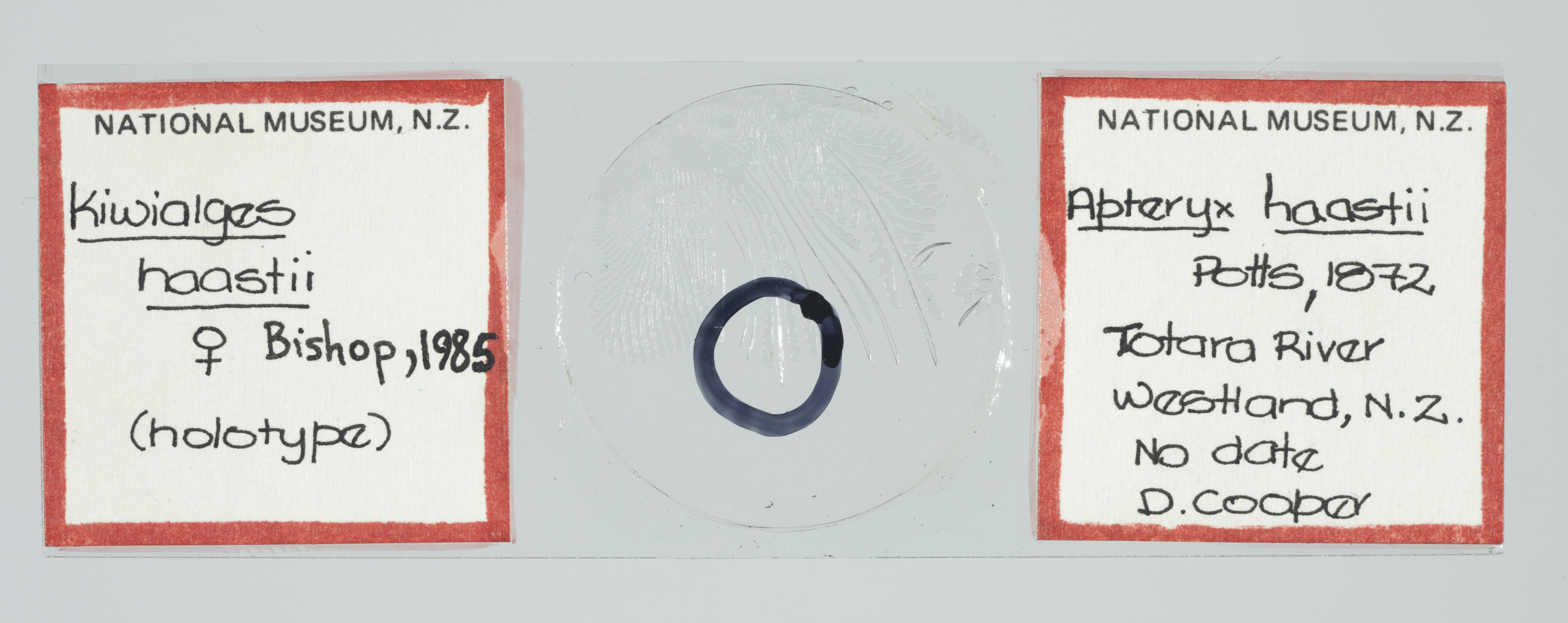
Slide-mounted holotype of Kiwialges haastii

== Description ==
Kiwalges haastii females are of average size for a feather mite, about 360 μm long and 186 μm wide; males are about 300 μm long and 167 μm wide. They are distinguished from the other two Kiwalges species by the positioning of setae on their third leg, the absence of a tubercle on their second leg, and the shape of their propodosomal shield. (Note: Although the cover date for the volume of the New Zealand Journal of Zoology is 1984, Bishop's description was actually published in 1985, and is so noted in the text.)

== Biology ==
Little is known of this species' biology, but the tick Ixodes anatis also infests kiwi, living in the stable microclimate of a nesting burrow and roughly synchronising its hatching with months when young kiwi are still present in the nest.

Feather mites do not suck the blood of their host, but feed on feathers and skin flakes. Some species feed on the preening oil secreted from the uropygial gland, but kiwi have no such gland, so Kiwalges haastii probably feeds on the feathers themselves. Feather mites in other birds can cause some feather damage and skin lesions, but there is no evidence that they are harmful to kiwi. Kiwialges haastii seems to be the only host-specific (monoxenous) species of kiwi mite.
