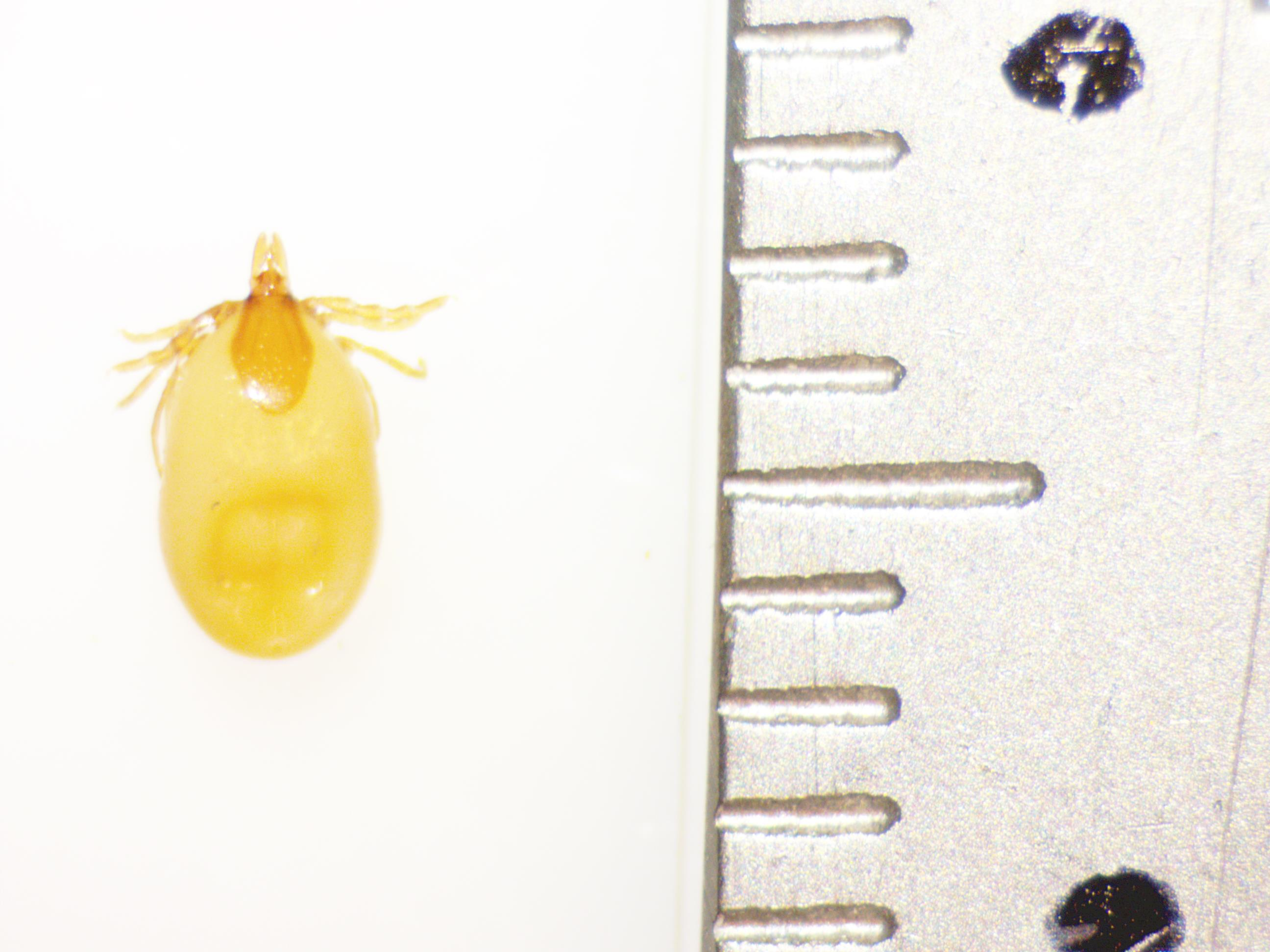
- Adult female I. angustus, engorged

Scientific classification
- Domain: Eukaryota
- Kingdom: Animalia
- Phylum: Arthropoda
- Subphylum: Chelicerata
- Class: Arachnida
- Order: Ixodida
- Family: Ixodidae
- Genus: Ixodes
- Species: I. angustus

Binomial name
- Ixodes angustus Neumann, 1899
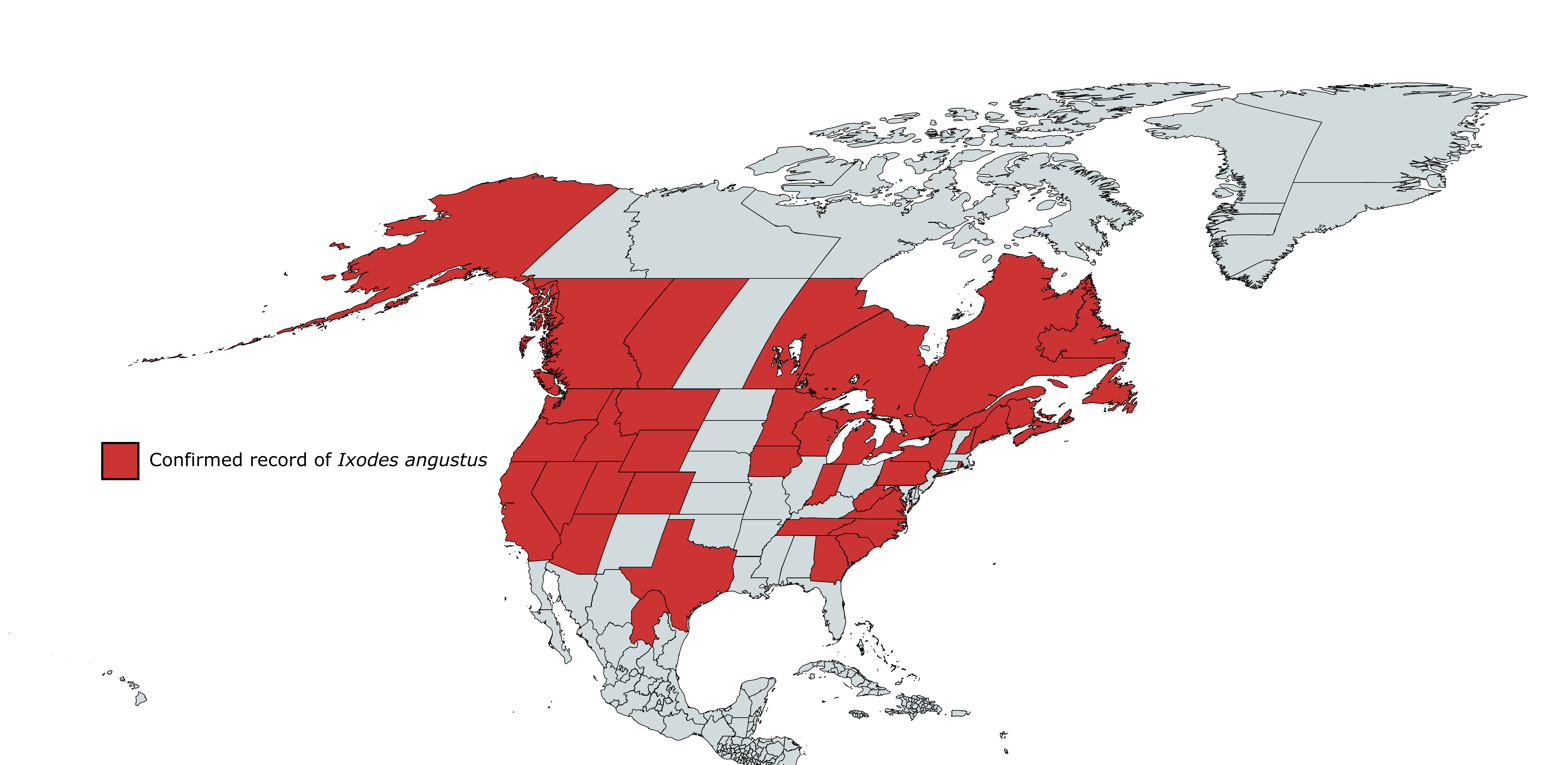

= Ixodes angustus =

Species of tick

Ixodes angustus is a species of parasitic tick, whose range encompasses the majority of Canada and the United States, along with parts of northern Mexico. I. angustus is a member of the Ixodidae (hard-bodied) family of ticks. It is most abundant in cool, moist biomes such as riparian, boreal or montane zones. I. angustus is a host generalist and has been discovered feeding on more than 90 different host species, including humans and domestic dogs. I. angustus has been identified as a potential vector for Lyme disease but is not considered a principal vector due to the relative rarity with which it feeds on humans.

== Description ==
Adult females are approximately 2 mm unfed and can grow up to 7 mm when engorged with a blood meal. They possess a diamond shaped non-ornate dorsal plate (otherwise known as a shield) with rounded edges. Palps are long, with a half-diamond shape (straight outer edge and a rounded inner edge). Adult males grow to around 2 mm, and cannot become engorged with blood as their inflexible back plate extends to cover the entire dorsal side of the tick. Palps are much smaller, thicker, and more ovular than females.

== Life-cycle ==
Ixodes angustus has a multi-stage life-cycle consisting of egg, larva, nymph and adult stage. They can complete this life-cycle in 7 months under mild temperatures, a shorter period than most other Ixodes.

Ixodes angustus larvae hatch after approximately 73 days and acquire blood meals from a vertebrate, most often a small mammal like a squirrel or mouse. These meals take place over an ~3 day feeding period, the protein from which enables the larvae to moult into a nymph after an average of 60 days. Nymphs again feed for approximately 3 days on vertebrates before becoming adults after an average of 30 days. Adult females will feed for ~7 days on a vertebrate host before laying egg clusters over a 16-day period. Adult males are only rarely found on hosts and are thus assumed to wait for potential mates in or around the nest of their prior host.

== Distribution ==
Ixodes angustus has a wide distribution in North America and has been recorded in all Canadian provinces except Saskatchewan (although it is suspected to occur there), the majority of continental US states, and the Mexican state of Coahuila. There have been several erroneous records of I. angustus in South and Central America, but thus far there are no Bona fide neotropical records of I.angustus. Within this extensive range, I. angustus is most prevalent in cool, damp habitats such as boreal, montane and riparian zones.

== Potential as a disease vector ==
Despite a wide range and demonstrated potential to carry Borrelia burgdorferi, the causative agent of Lyme disease, I. angustus is considered a bridge vector of lesser importance due to its nidicolous behaviour. Important Ixodes bridge vectors such as I. scapularis and I. pacificus exhibit a questing behaviour where they actively hunt for new hosts, enabling them to frequently acquire human or domestic animal hosts. In contrast, I. angustus rarely leaves the nest of its host, thus almost exclusively feeding on small or medium-sized nesting mammals like mice and squirrels. This behaviour also limits the accessibility of I. angustus to scientific study, as it is often missed by sampling techniques which rely upon ticks actively seeking a host such as tick dragging or CO_{2} trapping.
