= Powassan encephalitis =

- Specialty: Infectious diseases

Powassan encephalitis, caused by the Powassan virus (POWV), a flavivirus also known as the deer tick virus, is a form of arbovirus infection that results from tick bites. It can occur as a co-infection with Lyme disease, as both are transmitted to humans by the same species of tick. Over the last decade, there has been a surge in the number of cases and an expansion of its geographic range. In the United States, cases have been documented primarily in the northeast. The disease was first isolated from the brain of a boy who died of encephalitis in Powassan, Ontario, in 1958. This disease is classified as a zoonosis, originating in animals, often found in rodents and ticks, with subsequent transmission to humans. The virus shares antigenic similarities with the Far Eastern tick-borne encephalitis viruses.

== Signs and symptoms ==
Signs and symptoms manifest within 7–10 days and include fever, headache, partial paralysis, confusion, nausea, and even coma.

== Treatment ==
There is currently no established treatment.

== Prognosis ==
Half of all cases result in permanent neurological damage, and 10-15% result in death.
