= Ixodes heathi =

Scientific classification
- Kingdom: Animalia
- Phylum: Arthropoda
- Subphylum: Chelicerata
- Class: Arachnida
- Order: Ixodida
- Family: Ixodidae
- Genus: Ixodes
- Species: I. heathi

Binomial name
- Ixodes heathi Kwak, 2018

Species of tick

Heath's tick (Ixodes heathi) is a critically endangered invertebrate native to the Australian alps. It has a close symbiotic relationship with the mountain pygmy possum, and is believed to depend on this species for its survival.

== Etymology ==
Heath’s tick is named after the New Zealand parasitologist Allen C.G. Heath.

== Ecology ==
The ecology of Heath’s tick is poorly known. However, it has been suggested that this species may be a nest dwelling species which utilises the dens of the mountain pygmy possum to avoid the freezing winters of the Australian alps. Heath’s tick, and its closest relatives Ixodes riscicollaris and Ixodes goliath all occupy habitats with relictual cool, wet Gondwanan climates at high altitudes.

The mountain pygmy possum relies on the fruits of the mountain plum-pine (Podocarpus lawrencei) as a seasonal food source. However, feral horses and deer have caused this plant to decline due to over-grazing. The decline of the mountain pygmy possum, due to decline of the mountain plum-pine, could cause Heath’s tick to become extinct, an example of a trophic cascade. The fragmentation of populations of mountain pygmy possums and Heath’s ticks may result in inbreeding and stochastic events (such as fires) resulting on localised extinction of individual populations. At present Heath’s tick is known from the Australian state of Victoria where it has only been collected on Mt. Higginbotham (the type locality) and on Mt. Loch.
