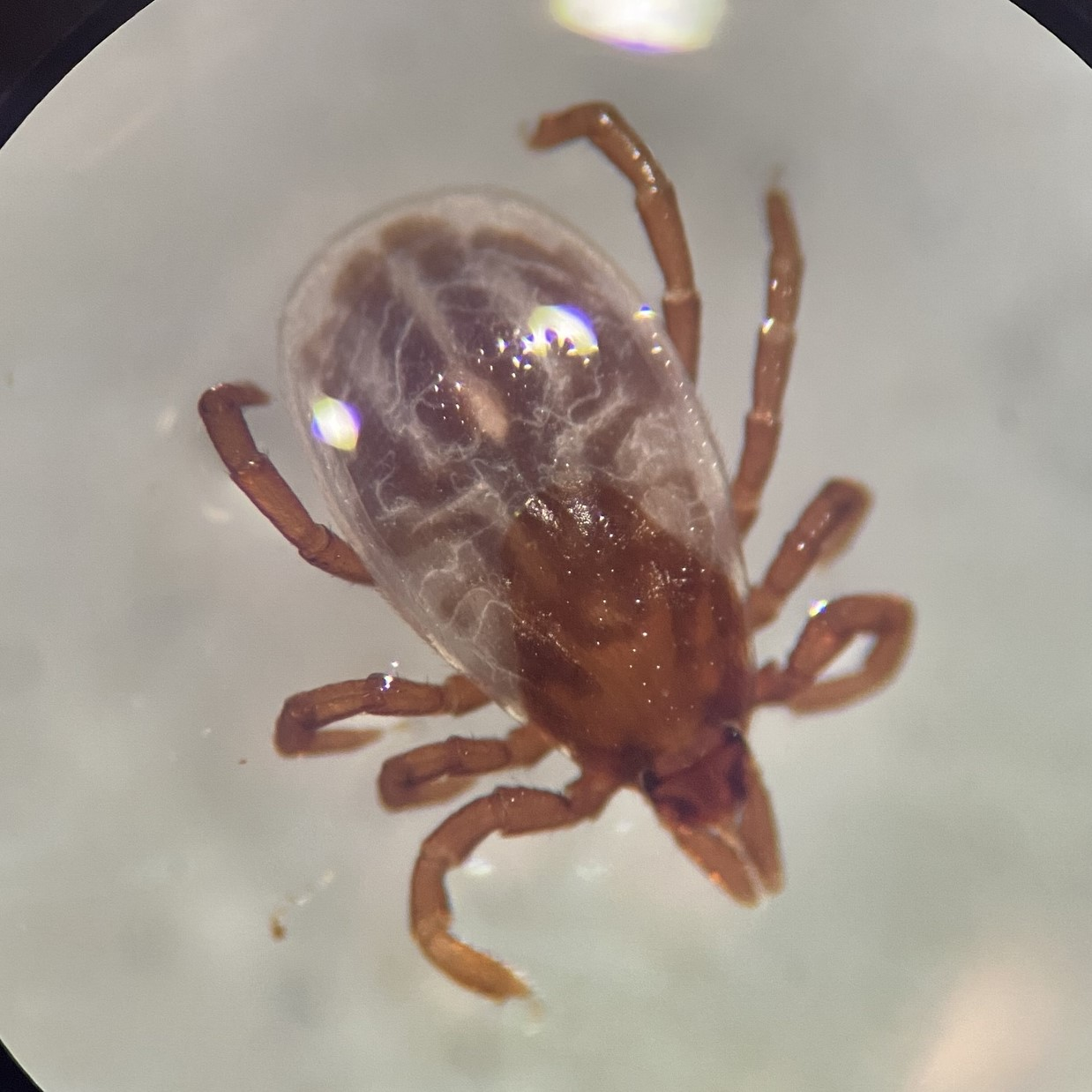

Scientific classification
- Kingdom: Animalia
- Phylum: Arthropoda
- Subphylum: Chelicerata
- Class: Arachnida
- Order: Ixodida
- Family: Ixodidae
- Genus: Ixodes
- Species: I. marxi

Binomial name
- Ixodes marxi Banks, 1908

= Ixodes marxi =

Species of tick

Ixodes marxi is a species of tick, commonly known as the squirrel tick. It is a known vector of Powassan virus and can transmit the virus to human beings. These ticks can be found in numerous states of the United States as well as numerous Canadian provinces. Nymphs have been found on vegetation. Hosts include the eastern chipmunk, American red squirrel, Eastern gray squirrel, flying squirrels, snowshoe hares, foxes, and raccoons.
