= Ixodes ceylonensis =

Scientific classification
- Domain: Eukaryota
- Kingdom: Animalia
- Phylum: Arthropoda
- Subphylum: Chelicerata
- Class: Arachnida
- Order: Ixodida
- Family: Ixodidae
- Genus: Ixodes
- Species: I. ceylonensis

Binomial name
- Ixodes ceylonensis Kohls, 1950

Synonyms
- Ixodes (Afrixodes) cecylonensis Morel, 1966

Species of tick

Ixodes ceylonensis is a hard-bodied tick of the genus Ixodes. It is found in India and Sri Lanka. It is an obligate ectoparasite of mammals.

== Parasitism ==
Adults parasitize various smaller mammals such as Herpestes smithii, Rattus rattus, Crocidura miya, Suncus montanus, Solisorex pearsoni, Madromys blanfordi, Felis chaus, Felis bengalensis. Nymphs were recorded from Suncus murinus and Rattus species, whereas larva was found from these species and also from Mus booduga. It is a potential vector of Kyasanur Forest disease virus.
