= Ixodes cornuatus =

Scientific classification
- Domain: Eukaryota
- Kingdom: Animalia
- Phylum: Arthropoda
- Subphylum: Chelicerata
- Class: Arachnida
- Order: Ixodida
- Family: Ixodidae
- Genus: Ixodes
- Species: I. cornuatus

Binomial name
- Ixodes cornuatus Roberts, 1960

Species of tick

Ixodes cornuatus, commonly known as the Tasmanian paralysis tick, is one of about 75 species of Australian tick fauna. It is found across Tasmania and Victoria. It has been responsible for several cases of envenomation in humans and the death of one cat.

Ixodes cornuatus has been implicated in the envenomation of cats.

Ixodes cornuatus is difficult to distinguish from Ixodes holocyclus. The ranges of the two species overlap in Eastern Victoria.
