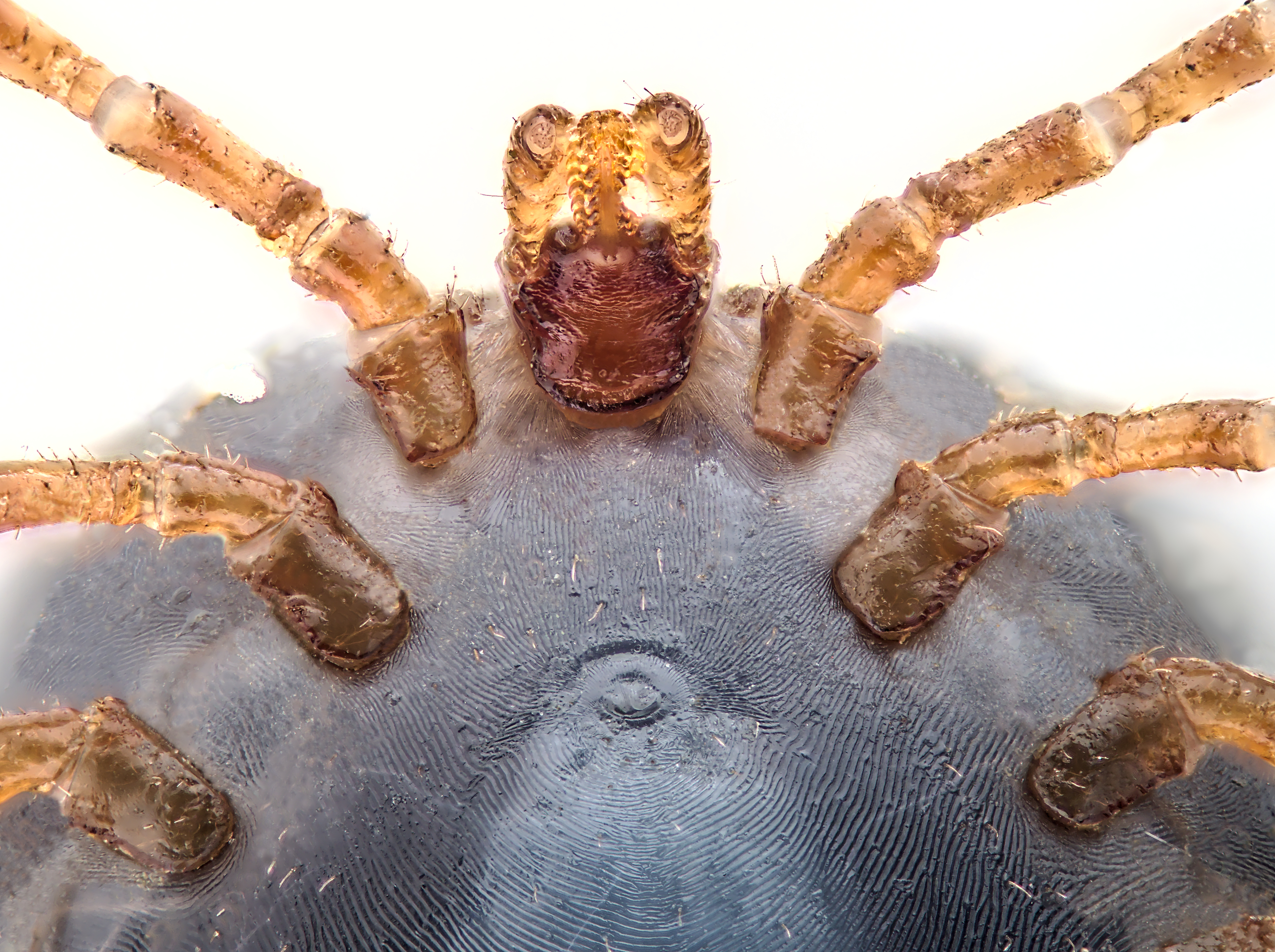
- ventral view of Ixodes canisuga

Scientific classification
- Domain: Eukaryota
- Kingdom: Animalia
- Phylum: Arthropoda
- Subphylum: Chelicerata
- Class: Arachnida
- Order: Ixodida
- Family: Ixodidae
- Genus: Ixodes
- Species: I. canisuga

Binomial name
- Ixodes canisuga Johnston, 1849

= Ixodes canisuga =

Species of tick

Ixodes canisuga, the dog tick, is a species of tick in the family Ixodidae that can be found in Russia and throughout Europe where it feeds on foxes, cats, dogs, horses, badgers and sheep. It has a thick cuticle which allows it to withstand dry conditions.
