= Ixodes microgalei =

Scientific classification
- Domain: Eukaryota
- Kingdom: Animalia
- Phylum: Arthropoda
- Subphylum: Chelicerata
- Class: Arachnida
- Order: Ixodida
- Family: Ixodidae
- Genus: Ixodes
- Species: I. microgalei

Binomial name
- Ixodes microgalei Apanaskevich, Soarimalala & Goodman, 2013

Species of tick

Ixodes microgalei is a species of Ixodes that was discovered in the humid eastern forests of the Antananarivo Province in Madagascar. Females of this species parasitize various species of shrew tenrecs of the genus Microgale (Afrosoricida: Tenrecidae, Oryzorictinae). All members of the genus Microgale, as well as of the larger subfamily to which that genus belongs, are endemic to Madagascar.

== Distinguishing characteristics ==
The external morphology of females of the species I. microgalei closely resemble that of females of the species Ixodes colasbelcouri and Ixodes nesomys. All 3 species have long, narrow, tapering auriculae (lateral protrusions found on the ventral surface of their basis capituli, an apical region that is formed by the basal portions of their 2 pedipalps) and several unique structure on their coxae (the most basal of the several segments that constitute each of their legs), including internal spurs on their first pair of coxae (coxae I); small but distinct external spurs on their first pair of coxae (coxae I); and syncoxae (posterior regions that have a lighter color or texture) on their first, second, and third pairs of coxae (coxae I-III). However, females of the species I. microgalei are easily distinguishable from females of the species I. colasbelcouri thanks to their possession of distinctly shorter spurs on their fourth pair of coxae (coxae IV) and from female I. nesomys thanks to the notably longer spurs that they possess on their first pair of (coxae I); the larger areas of syncoxae that they possess on their first, second, and third pairs of coxae (coxae I-III); and the larger and deeper punctations that they possess on their scutum (the inflexible shells that cover much of the posterior surface of their bodies).

== Distribution and hosts ==
Ixodes microgalei is confined to Madagascar and is currently known only from the Antananarivo Province. All specimens of I. microgalei, which include exclusively of females as of 2013, have been collected from shrew tenrecs, and specifically from the species Microgale dobsoni, Microgale parvula, and Microgale soricoides. All of 3 of these host species have broad geographical distributions within the humid forests of Madagascar, which span much of the 1,300 km length of the Antananarivo Province, and frequently occur in sympatry. Given the extensive geographical distributions of M. dobsoni, M. parvula, and M. soricoides, there is no obvious ecological reason to believe why I. microgalei, which parasitizes all 3, would be restricted to the Antananarivo Province; consequently, researchers suspect that with further collections, I. microgalei will be found in other areas of the eastern humid forest. In the forests of Tsinjoarivo, where the holotype for I. microgalei was collected, 11 species of Microgale are known to occur within the same immediate region.

== Etymology ==
The species is named after Microgale, the mammalian host genus upon which it is found.
