= Powassan virus =

Virus classification
- (unranked): Virus
- Realm: Riboviria
- Kingdom: Orthornavirae
- Phylum: Kitrinoviricota
- Class: Flasuviricetes
- Order: Amarillovirales
- Family: Flaviviridae
- Genus: Orthoflavivirus
- Subgenus: Euflavivirus
- Species: Orthoflavivirus powassanense

Member viruses
- Powassan virus (POWV); Deer tick virus (DTV)

Species of virus

Powassan virus (POWV) is a tickborne flavivirus found naturally in North America and Russia. It is named after the town of Powassan, Ontario, where it was identified in a young boy after his death. It is known to cause encephalitis, and no human approved vaccine or antiviral drug exists. Prevention of tick bites is the best precaution.

== Classification and occurrence ==
Powassan virus (POWV) is a flavivirus named after the town of Powassan, Ontario, Canada, where it was identified in a five-year-old boy, Lincoln Byers, who died from encephalitis in 1958. The ICTV species name for the Powassan Virus is Orthoflavivirus powassanense. The virus exists in North America and causes long-term neurological sequelae. The first human case in the United States was found in 1970 in New Jersey and the first in Russia in 1978. Powassan virus has been noted as the only tick-borne Flavivirus in North America with human pathogenicity.

Powassan virus is also found in the warm climate across Eurasia, where it is part of the tick-borne encephalitis virus complex. It is found in the Russian Far East (Primorsky Krai) and appears to have been introduced there around 1942.

== Evolution ==
Powassan virus is an RNA virus split into two separate lineages: Lineage I, the "prototype" lineage; and Lineage II, the deer tick virus (DTV) lineage. Lineage II has the most genetic variation, which indicates that it is most likely the ancestral lineage that split as a result of positive natural selection. DTV is very closely related to Powassan virus: a sequence analysis showed that the two viruses diverged about 200 years ago. Even though Lineage II has been predominant in POWV positive tick pools, both lineages have had confirmed cases of human disease in North America and Russia. The lineages share 84% nucleotide sequences and 94% amino acid sequence identity. Cross-neutralization occurs among flaviviruses due to the conservation of the envelope protein; this is what contributes to the fact that the two lineages are "serologically indistinguishable." As a result, the lineages are part of the same viral species.

The evolutionary rate of Powassan virus is 3.3 × 10^{−5} nucleotide substitution per site per year (95% HPD, 2.0 × 10^{−5}–4.7 × 10^{−5}). The value is compatible with that of tick-borne encephalitis virus (TBEV) and louping-ill virus (LIV) (1.0 × 10^{−5}–2.2 × 10^{−5} for TBEV and 5.7 × 10^{−6}–3.9 × 10^{−5} for LIV).

The most recent common ancestor of modern POWV split into two independent genetic lineages between 2,600 and 6,030 years ago, probably as a result of the Beringia flood, about 11,700 years ago.

== Vectors ==
The virus can be transmitted with bites from six known species of ticks: four species of Ixodes ticks, Ixodes cookei, Ixodes scapularis, Ixodes marxi and Ixodes spinipalpis, and the ticks Dermacentor andersoni and Dermacentor variabilis.

People with POWV have been mostly confirmed as having one strain of POWV, the deer tick virus. I. scapularis is an important vector for the deer tick virus, which plays a vital role in maintaining the POWV. I. scapularis is also a primary vector for the agent of Lyme disease, because they are generalist feeders and readily bite humans.

In Canada and the northeastern U.S., Ixodes cookei is the predominant species, while I. scapularis is a significant vector in Minnesota and Wisconsin. POWV is transmitted when an infected tick bites a mammal; in humans the tick is typically I. scapularis. In North America, the POWV's lineages are maintained in three main enzootic cycles involving three different tick species and their respective small to medium-sized woodland mammals. POWV may infect I. cookei and woodchucks, or it may infect I. marxi and squirrels, and it can cycle between I. scapularis and white-footed mice.

Based on the time interval for other tick-borne diseases like Lyme disease and anaplasmosis, the time interval for transmission of POWV is expected to be less than 12 hours. Once the POWV reaches humans it cannot be transmitted to a feeding tick, so humans are considered "dead-end" hosts. POWV can be transmitted from an I. scapularis nymph to a mouse as quickly as 15 minutes after attachment.

== Signs and symptoms ==
Powassan virus infection is rarely diagnosed as a cause of encephalitis, but when it is, Powassan encephalitis is severe, and neurologic sequelae are common. Powassan encephalitis has symptoms compatible with acute disseminated encephalomyelitis, often making it hard to diagnose. Powassan virus encephalitis is a challenge to diagnose because only a few laboratories offer testing, the most effective being serologic testing.

No medications or approved vaccines treat or prevent the POWV. People affected by the Powassan virus generally first show symptoms 1 to 3 weeks after infection. Initial symptoms include fever, headache, nausea, occasional confusion, and weakness. With severe Powassan illness, victims should be hospitalized because the symptoms worsen. If not treated, symptoms can extend to meningoencephalitis, which may include seizures, aphasia, cranial nerve palsies, paresis, and altered mental status. The best treatment for POWV illnesses includes medications to reduce brain swelling, respiratory support, and intravenous fluids. About 10% of POWV encephalitis cases are fatal, and half the survivors have permanent symptoms affecting their brains.

=== Reported cases (2001–present) ===
There were 33 confirmed cases of Powassan virus infection in the U.S. between 2001 and 2010.

A rare case of a five-month-old Connecticut infant boy contracting Powassan virus infection was published in 2017. He survived with normal motor and verbal development on follow-up at the age of 10 months. A head MRI showed severely abnormal brain conditions, including scarring (gliosis) and softening (encephalomalacia) in the thalamus and basal ganglia on both sides, and volume loss and early mineralization in the left basal ganglia.

On October 28, 2019, former U.S. Senator Kay Hagan died after contracting the Powassan virus in 2016. She was 66 years old.

In 2022, the Connecticut Department of Public Health confirmed that a man aged in his 50s contracted the Powassan virus in the state during March and was hospitalized with severe neurological symptoms. He was discharged to recover at home. In 2023, the Maine Center for Disease Control and Prevention reported that a 58-year-old man from Sagadahoc County died from Powassan virus.

On June 3, 2024, artist, author, and musician MaryAnn Harris, spouse and longtime collaborator of Charles de Lint, died after a long struggle with Powassan virus, at age 71. Harris contracted the virus in 2021 and was subsequently paralyzed. She spent much of the rest of her life in the hospital and other care facilities.

== Epidemiology ==
Powassan Virus (POWV) is the only tick-borne flavivirus endemic in North America. POWV human illnesses have been reported in the U.S., Canada and Russia. POWV has genetic variations, including deer tick virus (DTV), which is transmitted by the black-legged tick (aka deer tick), Ixodes scapularis. It has two distinct lineages. POWV lineage I is transmitted by the Ixodes cookei, which is endemic in the Great Lakes region. POWV lineage II is transmitted by Ixodes scapularis, which is endemic in the northeastern U.S. Humans can become infected in 15 to 30 minutes after tick attachment.

Ixodes ticks have three life stages that require a host: larva, nymph, and adult. Each stage requires a blood meal to progress to the next life stage. Nymphs frequently bite humans, which is when I. scapularis is most likely to infect a human host with a pathogen. The most common reservoirs (hosts) for I. scapularis are white-footed mice and white-tail deer. The most common reservoirs for I. cookei are skunks, woodchucks, and squirrels. Humans are incidental hosts: ticks do not need to feed on humans to survive, but do so if a human is the host they find at the time for their next blood meal.

In the U.S., the highest incidence of POWV is in Minnesota and Wisconsin, with Massachusetts and New York also having higher incidence than other states in the Great Lakes or Northeast region. POWV was included in the list of nationally notifiable diseases to the U.S. Centers for Disease Control and Prevention (CDC) in 2002. Between 2009 and 2018, 133 cases of neuroinvasive POWV and 12 cases of non-neuroinvasive POWV were reported to the CDC. From its discovery in 1958 until 2019, there were 150 reported human illnesses caused by POWV. The incidence rate of POWV in the U.S. was one case per year from 1958 to 2005, and has risen to 10 cases per year since then.

POWV is detected with IgM antibody capture ELISA of an IgM immunofluorescence antibody (IFA) assay, plaque reduction neutralization test (PRNT), detection of virus-specific nucleic acids, isolation in culture, or a >4-fold increase in antibody titers from paired acute and convalescent sera. These tests for POWV can only be done at a state lab or the CDC. The CDC's diagnostic criteria are: resides in an endemic area, reported tick exposure, and presented with fever, altered mental status, seizures and focal neurological deficits and blood, tissue or cerebrospinal fluid (CSF) are positive on Powassan IgM or Powassan PRNT tests.

== Research ==
Scientists at the Vaccine and Immunotherapy Center at The Wistar Institute have designed and tested the first-of-its-kind synthetic DNA vaccine candidate against Powassan virus (POWV), targeting portions of the virus envelope protein.
