= Ixodes siamensis =

Scientific classification
- Domain: Eukaryota
- Kingdom: Animalia
- Phylum: Arthropoda
- Subphylum: Chelicerata
- Class: Arachnida
- Order: Ixodida
- Family: Ixodidae
- Genus: Ixodes
- Species: I. siamensis

Binomial name
- Ixodes siamensis Kitaoka & Suzuki, 1983

Species of tick

Ixodes siamensis is an ixodid tick (hard tick) that is parasitic on mammals in Thailand.
