= Feulgen stain =

Histochemical method to detect DNA

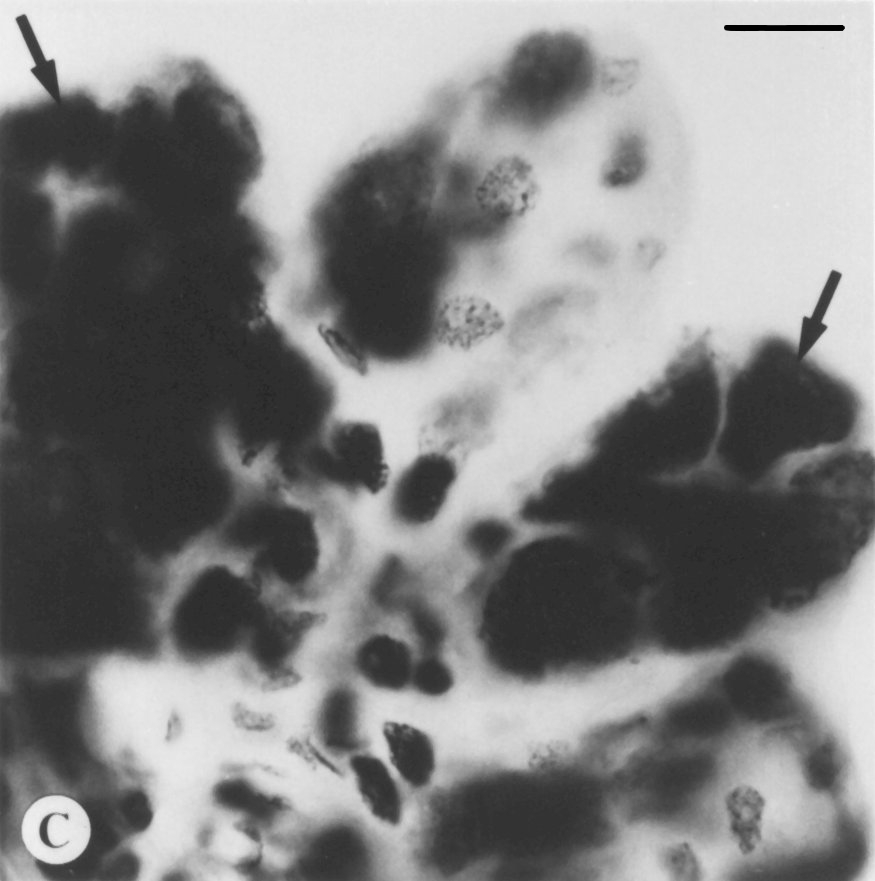
Black and white microphotograph of Feulgen stained, intact tick salivary glands infected by deer tick virus. Hypotrophied salivary acinus filled with amorphous masses of pinkstaining (=Feulgen positive) material (arrows). Scale bar = 10 μm.

Feulgen stain is a staining technique discovered by Robert Feulgen and used in histology to identify chromosomal material or DNA in cell specimens. It is darkly stained. It depends on acid hydrolysis of DNA, therefore fixating agents using strong acids should be avoided.

The specimen is subjected to warm (60 °C) hydrochloric acid, then to Schiff reagent. In the past, a sulfite rinse followed, but this is now considered unnecessary. Optionally, the sample can be counterstained with Light Green SF yellowish. Finally, it is dehydrated with ethanol, cleared with xylene, and mounted in a resinous medium.

DNA should be stained red. The background, if counterstained, is green. This reaction is also specific to DNA since RNA is characterized by a ribose sugar, instead of deoxyribose, preventing acid hydrolysis. This impedes purine detachment and thus do not allow the staining.

The Feulgen reaction is a semi-quantitative technique. If the only aldehydes remaining in the cell are those produced from the hydrolysis of DNA, then the technique is quantitative for DNA. It is possible to use an instrument known as a microdensitometer or microspectrophotometer to actually measure the intensity of the pink Feulgen reaction for a given organelle. Using this procedure, it was early determined that interphase cells were composed of two populations, those with diploid DNA and those with tetraploid DNA (two complete genomes). The nuclei looked identical, but one contained twice as much DNA. This gave rise to the division of the interphase period of the cell cycle to G1, S, and G2 phases based on the synthesis of that extra DNA.
