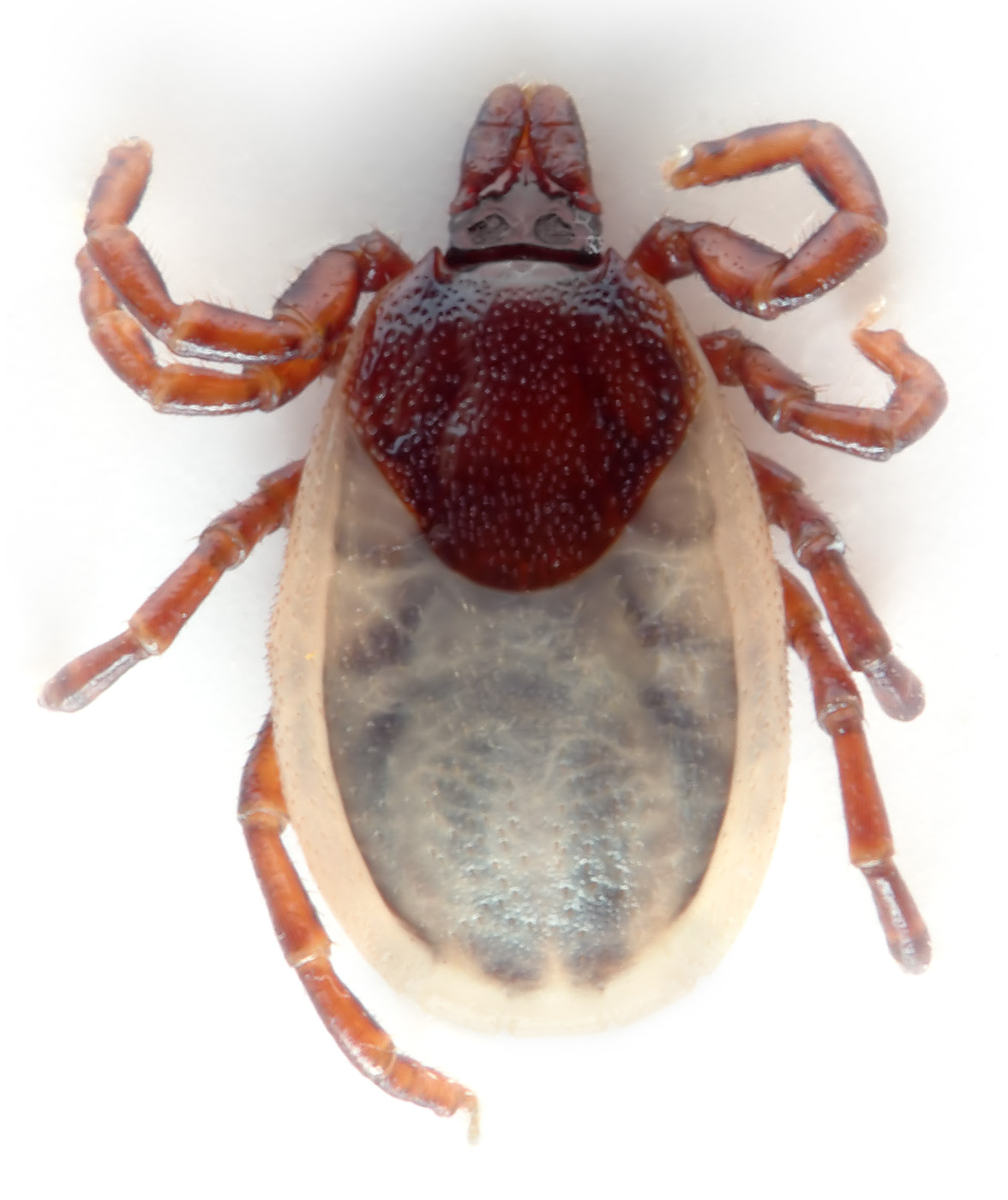

Scientific classification
- Domain: Eukaryota
- Kingdom: Animalia
- Phylum: Arthropoda
- Subphylum: Chelicerata
- Class: Arachnida
- Order: Ixodida
- Family: Ixodidae
- Genus: Ixodes
- Species: I. hexagonus

Binomial name
- Ixodes hexagonus Leach 1815

= Ixodes hexagonus =

Species of tick

Ixodes hexagonus, also known by the common name hedgehog tick, is a tick species in the genus Ixodes. It is a parasite of the European hedgehog.

== Appearance ==
The hedgehog tick is dark brown in color, but appears light grey or white when engorged. It can be identified by the humped tarsae of its first pair of legs. The adult female has a characteristic heart- or hexagon-shaped scutum; the male's scutum covers the entire body segment (idiosoma), as is typical for hard ticks. A lateral groove runs along the body segment, and becomes more evident when the tick is engorged.

== Distribution ==
Ixodes hexagonus is found widely throughout central and western Europe, and as far east as Siberia. In the United Kingdom, its distribution is sparse to the northwest, increasing in density to the southeast.

As a nest-dwelling parasite of the European hedgehog, its distribution is closely associated with that of its preferred host. Hedgehogs are not its only host, however; it can also be found on foxes, mustelids, dogs and cats.

== Habitat ==
Ixodes hexagonus is endophillic; it is predominantly a nest based parasite. It spends most of its life in the nest of the main hedgehog host. Thus it is buffered from the environmental conditions experienced by many other free ranging ticks such as I. ricinus.

== Role in Lyme disease ==
The hedgehog tick is a potentially important reservoir for Borrelia bacteria, the causative agent of Lyme disease. Studies indicate that both hedgehogs and I. hexagonus harbour Borrelia. I. hexagonus may act as an important vector of Lyme disease, transmitting it from hedgehog hosts to other small mammals. Thus ultimately it may spread to large mammals and humans. I. hexagonus may be important in sustaining Lyme disease in urban location where hedgehogs are a frequently found small mammal.
