= Robert Feulgen =

German physician and chemist (1884–1955)

- Joachim Wilhelm Robert Feulgen
- Born: September 2, 1884; Werden, Germany
- Died: October 24, 1955 (aged 71); Giessen, Germany
- Citizenship: German
- Education: University of Freiburg, University of Kiel
- Notable work: Feulgen stain
- Awards: Honorary doctorate (1954)
- Scientific career
- Fields: Biochemistry, medicine
- Workplaces: University of Berlin, Giessen University
- Doctoral advisor: Georg Hoppe-Seyler

Joachim Wilhelm Robert Feulgen (2 September 1884 – 24 October 1955) was a German physician and biochemist who, in 1914, developed a method for staining DNA (now known as the Feulgen stain) and who also discovered plant and animal nuclear DNA ("thymonucleic acid") congeniality.

== Biography ==
Feulgen was born in Werden on the river Ruhr. His father, Robert (1852–1893) came from a family involved in cloth making, while his mother, Anna Volckmar (1858–1947), came from a dye-making family. His father died when Feulgen was still in school and he was raised by his stepfather, Justizrat Strenge, about whom very little is known. He then went to grammar school in Essen and graduated from the Archigymnasium in Soest in 1905.

Feulgen studied medicine at the University of Freiburg and Kiel, graduating in 1910 with a degree. His doctoral thesis (dedicated to his step-father) was on purine metabolism in gout under Georg Hoppe-Seyler (1860–1940), son of Felix Hoppe-Seyler. He became an assistant to Hermann Steudel (1871–1967) at the University of Berlin from 1912 to 1918 before serving as a physician during World War I. His habilitation at Berlin was on the isolation of apurinic acid.

Feulgen married medical student Frieda Brauns in 1916. In 1919 he became an assistant at Giessen University thanks to Karl Bürker (1872–1957) who appointed him on the recommendation of Karl Thomas (1883–1969). In 1923 he became an extraordinary professor of physiological chemistry. In 1927 he became a "personal professor" and in 1928 he headed the physiological chemistry institute. He served as dean of the medical school in 1931.

In 1937 he became a member of the NSDAP with the hope that he would be promoted to full professor by the Nazi government officials. In his denazification decision of 1946, it was noted that he had merely been a nominal party member in group IV. In 1938 he was invited to attend the international physiological congress in Zurich and was also made Fellow of the Leopoldina Academy.

In December 1944, his laboratory in Giessen was destroyed by Allied bombing. The institute was re-established in 1950, and in March 1951 he was appointed as a full professor. In 1953 he became an emeritus professor. In 1954 he was awarded an honorary doctorate.

== Notable work ==
The so-called "Feulgen reaction" was described as the hydrolysis of thymonucleic acid in cells. It was reported at the 8th German physiology congress in 1923 but had been worked on by him from 1914. He isolated DNA which was then called thymonucleic acid with dilute hydrochloric acid to make it apurinic. The apurinic acid was called thyminic or nuclealic acid and was shown by Feulgen to have a free aldehyde group. Using Schiff's reagent (fuchin sulfurous acid) it showed a magenta color. Unhydrolyzed nucleic acid did not produce this color. They were able to demonstrate the reaction in both extracts from plant and animal cells. Heinrich Rossenbeck assisted him and it was their 1924 work that became widely cited.
