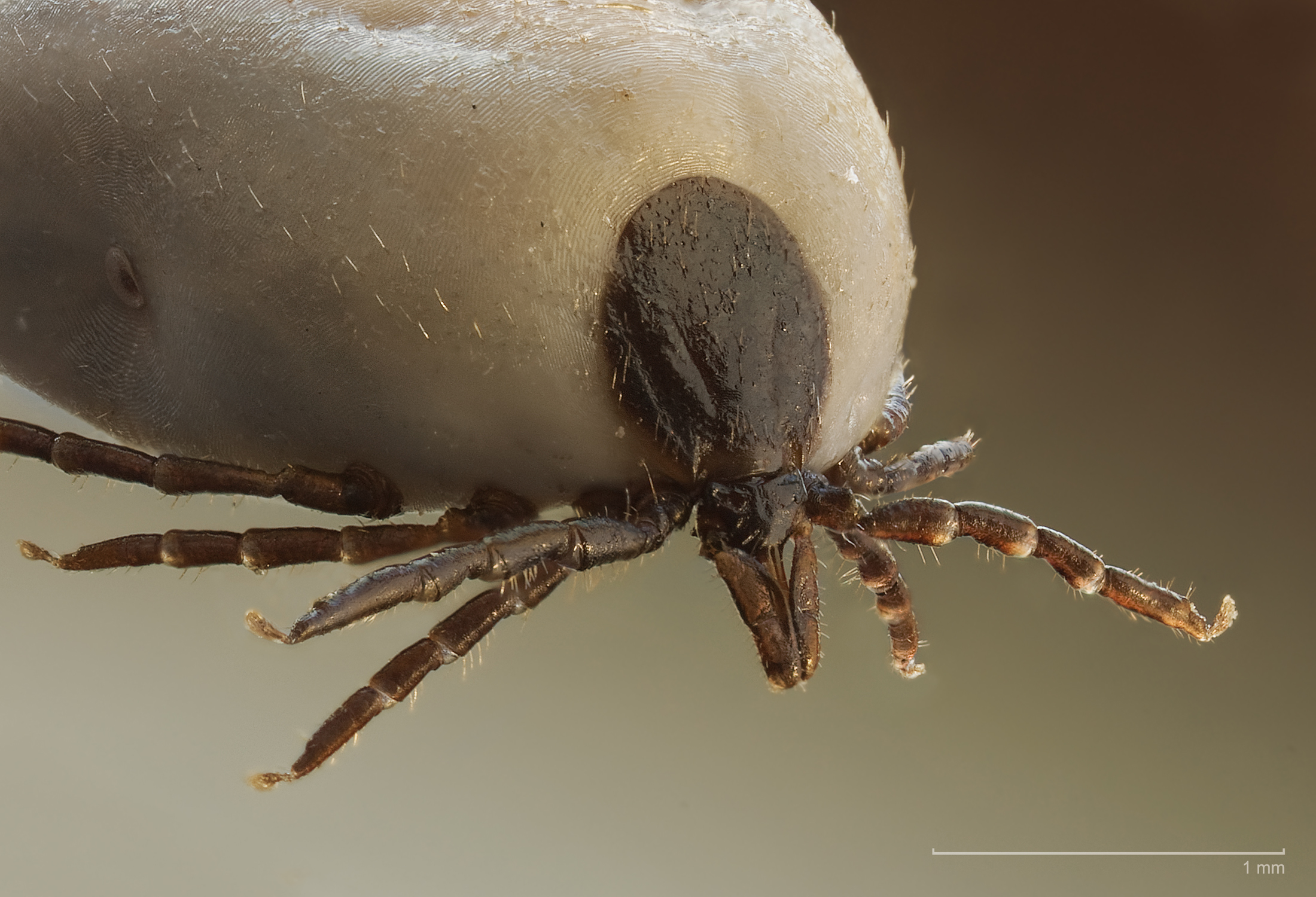
- Ixodes ricinus, engorged

Scientific classification
- Kingdom: Animalia
- Phylum: Arthropoda
- Subphylum: Chelicerata
- Class: Arachnida
- Order: Ixodida
- Family: Ixodidae
- Genus: Ixodes; Latreille, 1795

Type species
- Acarus ricinus Linnaeus, 1758

Species
- 274 extant, 2 extinct, see text.

= Ixodes =

Ixodes Temporal range: Cenomanian–present

Genus of ticks

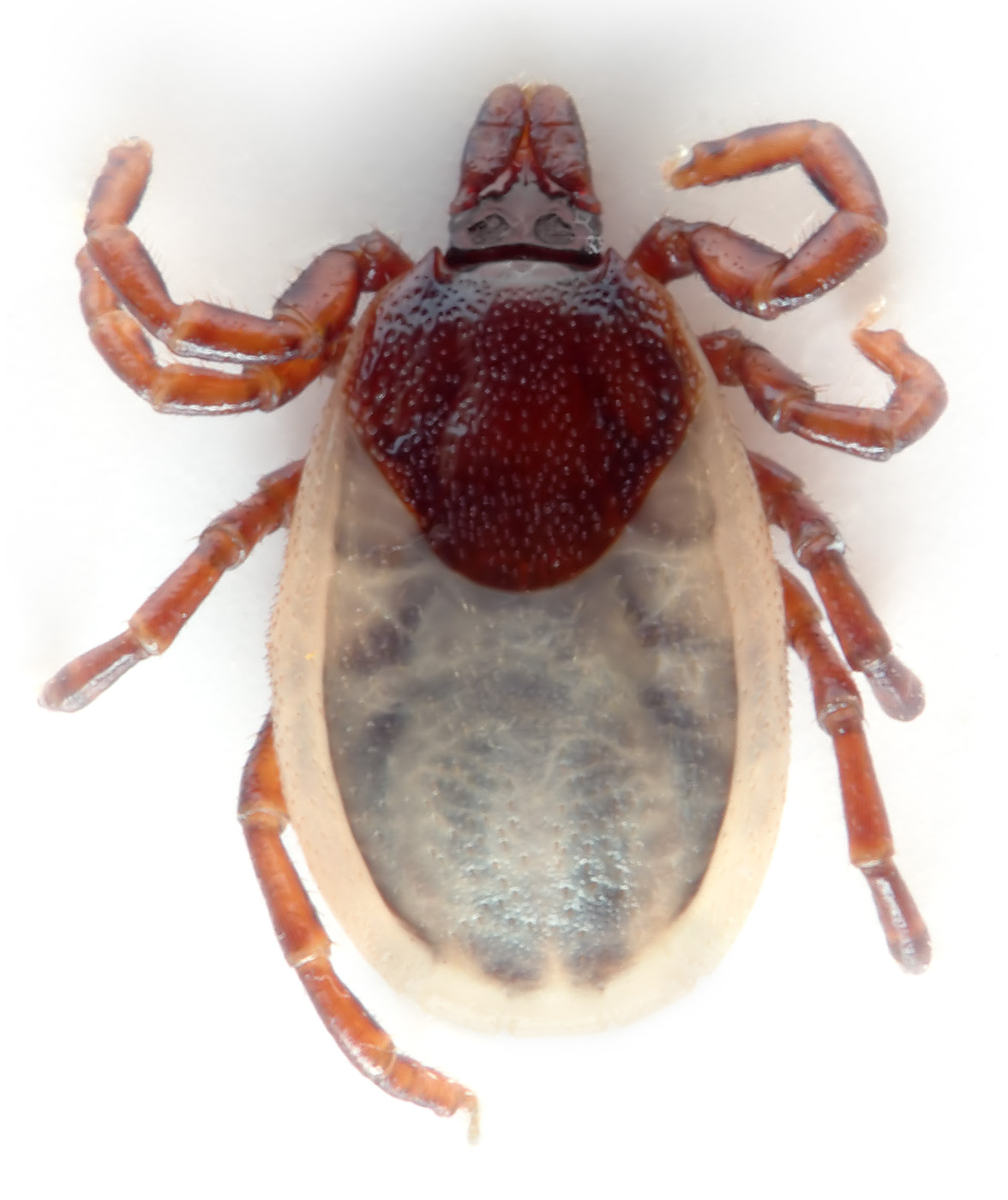
Ixodes hexagonus

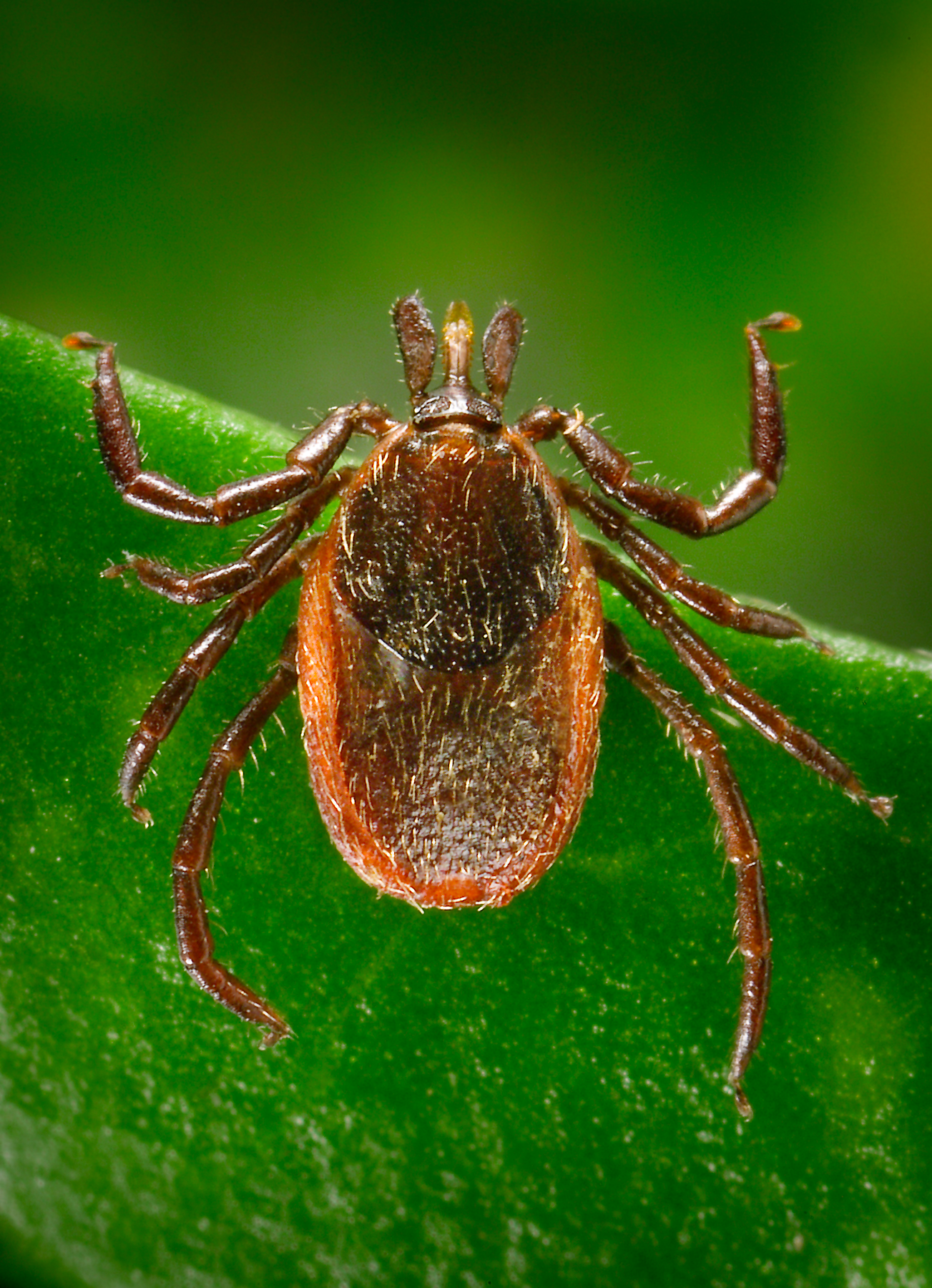
Ixodes pacificus

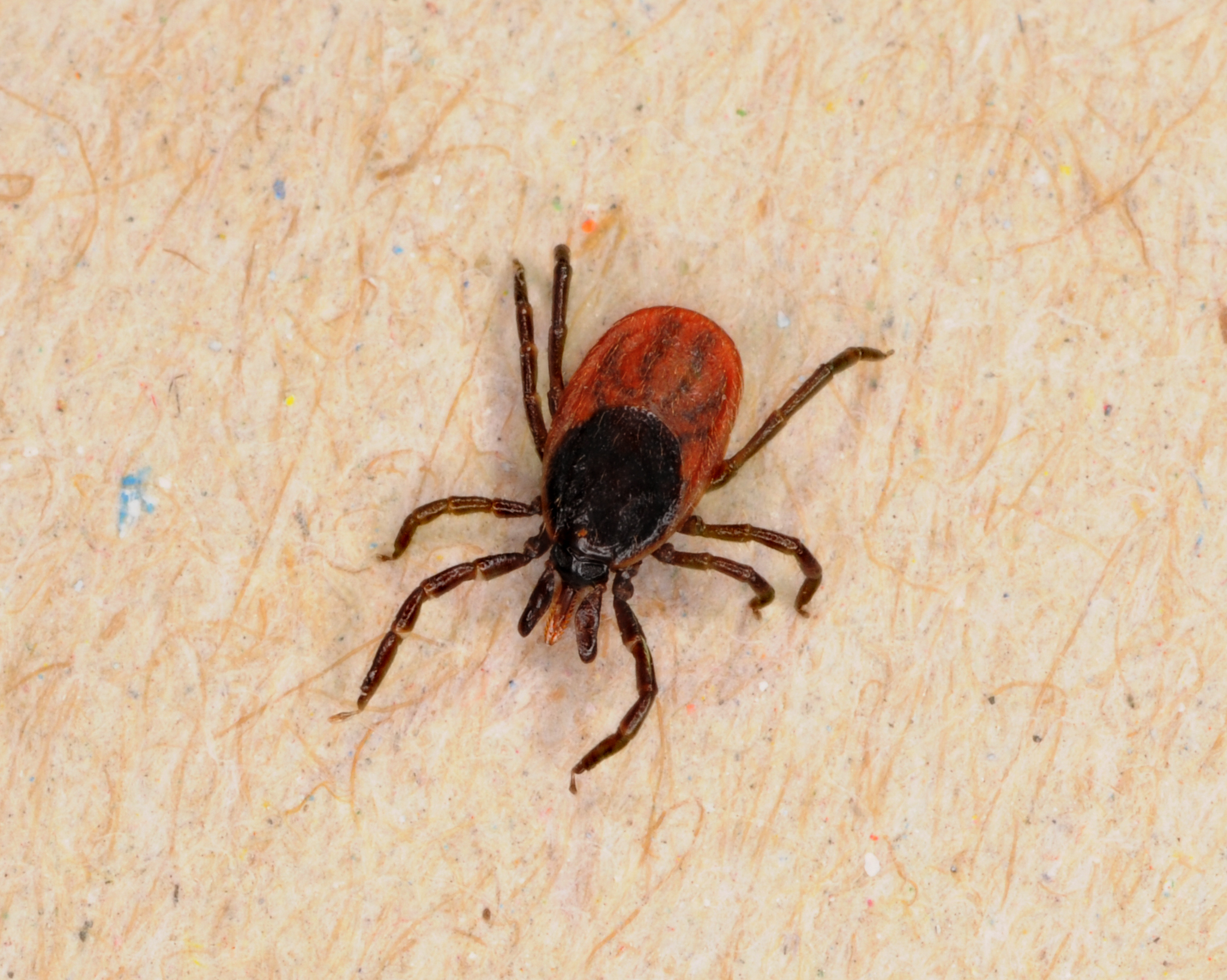
Ixodes ricinus

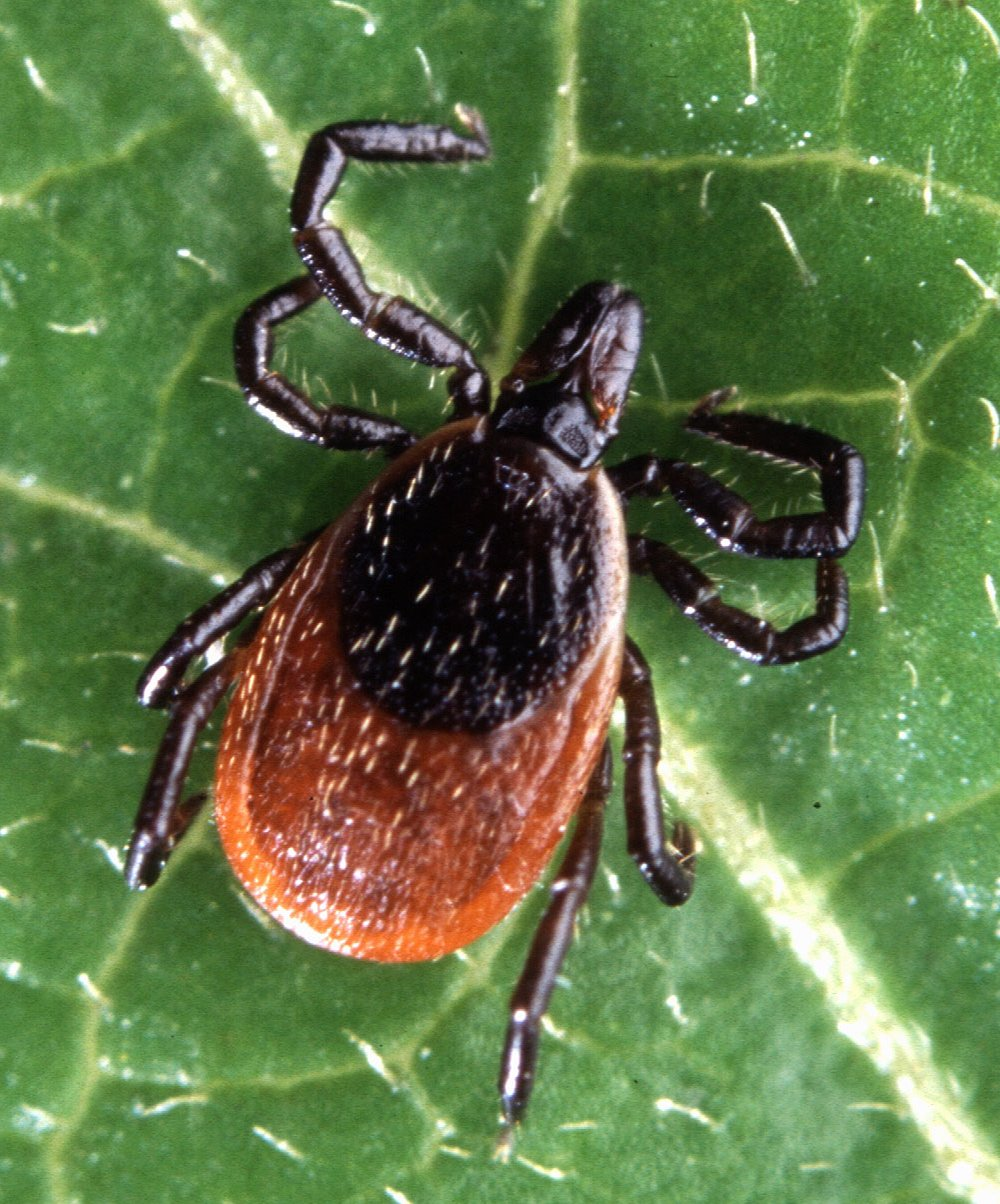
Ixodes scapularis

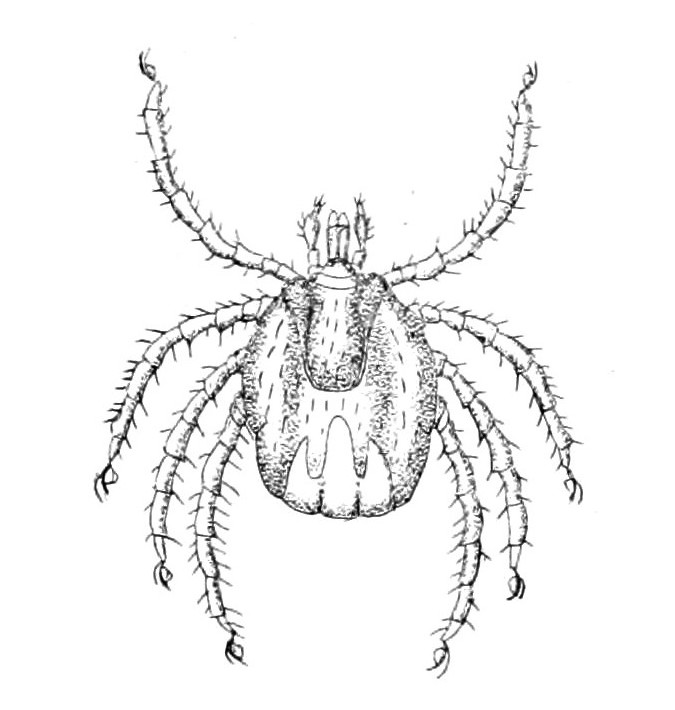
Ixodes uriae

Ixodes is a genus of hard-bodied ticks (family Ixodidae). It includes important disease vectors of animals and humans (tick-borne disease), and some species (notably Ixodes holocyclus) inject toxins that can cause paralysis. Some ticks in this genus may transmit the pathogenic bacterium Borrelia burgdorferi responsible for causing Lyme disease. Additional organisms that may be transmitted by Ixodes are parasites from the genus Babesia, which cause babesiosis, and bacteria from the related genus Anaplasma, which cause anaplasmosis.

== Ecology and distribution ==
Ixodes species have a near-cosmopolitan distribution and occur in all major biogeographic realms, including Antarctica, where they are associated with seabirds and penguin rookeries. The genus parasitizes a wide range of vertebrate hosts worldwide, including mammals, birds, and reptiles. Rodents and passerine birds are among the most commonly recorded hosts, especially in the Americas.

== Description and systematics ==
Ixodes is the sole representative of the Prostriata clade of the Ixodidae. Prostriate ticks are distinguished from the Metastriata with reference to the position of the anal groove. In Ixodes species, the groove loops anterior to the anus, whereas in Ambloymma, for example, the groove is positioned posterior to the anus. Ixodes species are small to medium-sized ticks, with a usually pyriform (pear-shaped) or ovate body profile. Mouthparts are anterior in both sexes, but usually long and slender in females, and short in males. Males have sclerotised adanal plates. Ixodes species are eyeless.

- Ixodidae
  - - Prostriata
      Ixodes
  - Metastriata
    - Robertsicus
    - - Amblyocephalus
        - Amblyomma
        - - Dermacentor
          - - Rhipicentor
            - - Hyalomma
              - Rhipicephalus
      - Haematobothrion
        - - Cryptocroton
          - Bothriocroton
        - - Archaeocroton
          - Alloceraea
        - Haemaphysalis

Ixodidae cladogram after Barker et al., (2024)

== Taxonomy ==
Ixodes contains 274 species. Classification, recognition and phylogenetic resolution of the Ixodes subgenera is ongoing. As many as 24 subgenera have been recognised by different authors. All are included here for completeness.

=== Subgenera ===
- Afrixodes Morel, 1966
- Alloixodes Černý, 1969
- Amerixodes Morel, 1998
- Australixodes Barker & Barker et al., 2023
- Ceratixodes Neumann, 1902
- Coxixodes Schulze, 1941
- Endopalpiger Schulze, 1935
- Eschatocephalus Frauenfeld, 1853
- Exopalpiger Schulze, 1935
- Filippoviella Apanaskevich, Greiman, Fedorov, Ahmed & Barker
- Haemixodes Kohls & Clifford, 1967
- Indixodes Morel, 1998
- Ixodes Latreille, 1795
- Ixodiopsis Filippova (1957)
- Lepidixodes Schulze, 1935
- Monoindex Emelyanova & Kozlovskaya, 1968
- Multidentatus Neumann, 1904
- Partipalpiger Hoogstraal et al., 1973
- Pholeoixodes Schulze, 1942
- Pomerantzevella Feider, 1965
- Scaphixodes Schulze, 1941
- Sternalixodes Schulze, 1935
- Trichotoixodes Reznik, 1961
- Xiphixodes Schulze, 1941

=== Species ===
- Ixodes abrocomae Lahille, 1916
- Ixodes (Ixodes) abramovi Apanaskevich, 2024
- Ixodes acer Apanaskevich & Schenk, 2020
- Ixodes acuminatus Neumann, 1901
- Ixodes (Indixodes) acutitarsus (Karsch, 1880)
- Ixodes affinis Neumann, 1899
- Ixodes albignaci Uilenberg and Hoogstraal, 1969
- Ixodes (Ixodes) algericus Keskin, Aftisse and Apanaskevich, 2024
- Ixodes alluaudi Neumann, 1913
- Ixodes amarali Fonseca, 1935b
- Ixodes (Afrixodes) ambohitantelensis Englert, Goodman & Apanaskevich, 2023
- Ixodes amersoni Kohls, 1966
- Ixodes (Australixodes) anatis Chilton, 1904
- Ixodes andinus Kohls, 1956a
- Ixodes (Pholeoixodes) angustus Neumann, 1899
- Ixodes antechini Roberts, 1960
- Ixodes apronophorus Schulze, 1924
- Ixodes arabukiensis Arthur, 1959
- Ixodes arboricola Schulze and Schlottke, 1929
- Ixodes arebiensis Arthur, 1956c
- Ixodes ariadnae Hornok, 2014
- Ixodes asanumai Kitaoka, 1973
- Ixodes aulacodi Arthur, 1956c
- Ixodes auriculaelongae Arthur, 1958
- Ixodes auritulus Neumann, 1904
- Ixodes (Endopalpiger) australiensis Neumann, 1904
- Ixodes baergi Cooley and Kohls, 1942
- Ixodes bakeri Arthur and Clifford, 1961
- Ixodes banksi Bishopp, 1911
- Ixodes (Endopalpiger) barkeri Barker, 2019
- Ixodes bedfordi Arthur, 1959
- Ixodes bequaerti Cooley and Kohls, 1945
- Ixodes berlesei Birula, 1895
- Ixodes bivari Santos Dias, 1990
- Ixodes bocatorensis Apanaskevich and Bermúdez, 2017
- Ixodes boliviensis Neumann, 1904
- Ixodes brevisetosus Apanaskevich et al., 2022
- Ixodes brewsterae Keirans, Clifford and Walker, 1982
- Ixodes browningi Arthur, 1956
- Ixodes brumpti Morel, 1965
- Ixodes brunneus Koch, 1844
- Ixodes calcarhebes Arthur and Zulu, 1980
- Ixodes caledonicus Nuttall, 1910
- Ixodes canisuga Johnston, 1849
- Ixodes capromydis Černý, 1966
- Ixodes catherinei Keirans, Clifford and Walker, 1982
- Ixodes cavipalpus Nuttall and Warburton, 1908
- Ixodes ceylonensis Kohls, 1950
- Ixodes chilensis Kohls, 1956
- Ixodes colasbelcouri Arthur, 1957
- Ixodes collaris Hornok, 2016
- Ixodes collocaliae Schulze, 1937
- Ixodes columnae Takada and Fujita, 1992
- Ixodes conepati Cooley and Kohls, 1943
- Ixodes (Sternalixodes) confusus Roberts, 1960
- Ixodes contrarius Apanaskevich et al., 2022
- Ixodes cookei Packard, 1869
- Ixodes cooleyi Aragão and Fonseca, 1951
- Ixodes copei Wilson, 1980
- Ixodes cordifer Neumann, 1908
- Ixodes cornuae Arthur, 1960c
- Ixodes (Sternalixodes) cornuatus Roberts, 1960
- Ixodes cornutus Lotozky, 1956
- Ixodes corwini Keirans, Clifford and Walker, 1982
- Ixodes crenulatus Koch, 1844
- Ixodes cuernavacensis Kohls and Clifford, 1966
- Ixodes cumulatimpunctatus Schulze, 1943
- Ixodes dampfi Cooley, 1943
- Ixodes (Trichotoixodes) daveyi Nuttall, 1913
- Ixodes dawesi Arthur, 1956
- Ixodes dendrolagi Wilson, 1967
- Ixodes dentatus Marx, 1899
- Ixodes dicei Keirans and Ajohda, 2003
- Ixodes diomedeae Arthur, 1958
- Ixodes diversifossus Neumann, 1899
- Ixodes djaronensis Neumann, 1907
- Ixodes domerguei Uilenberg and Hoogstraal, 1965
- Ixodes downsi Kohls, 1957
- Ixodes drakensbergensis Clifford, Theiler and Baker, 1975b
- Ixodes eadsi Kohls and Clifford, 1964
- Ixodes eastoni Keirans and Clifford, 1983
- Ixodes eichhorni Nuttall, 1916
- Ixodes eldaricus Dzhaparidze, 1950a
- Ixodes elongatus Bedford, 1929
- Ixodes eudyptidis Maskell, 1885
- Ixodes euplecti Arthur, 1958
- Ixodes evansi Arthur, 1956
- Ixodes (Exopalpiger) fecialis Warburton and Nuttall, 1909
- Ixodes (Ixodes) festai Arthur, 1961
- Ixodes filippovae Černý, 1961
- Ixodes fossulatus Neumann, 1899
- Ixodes (Trichotoixodes) frontalis (Panzer, 1798)
- Ixodes fuscipes Koch, 1844a
- Ixodes fynbosensis Apanaskevich, Horak, Matthee and Matthee, 2011
- Ixodes galapagoensis Clifford and Hoogstraal, 1980
- Ixodes (Filippoviella) ghilarovi Filippova and Panova, 1988b
- Ixodes gibbosus Nuttall, 1916
- Ixodes giluwensis Apanaskevich & Schenk, 2020
- Ixodes goliath Apanaskevich and Lemon, 2018
- Ixodes granulatus Supino, 1897
- Ixodes gregsoni Lindquist, Wu and Redner, 1999
- Ixodes guatemalensis Kohls, 1956
- Ixodes guglielmonei Apanaskevich et al., 2022
- Ixodes hearlei Gregson, 1941
- Ixodes heathi Kwak, 2018
- Ixodes heinrichi Arthur, 1962
- Ixodes (Pholeoixodes) hexagonus Leach, 1815
- Ixodes himalayensis Dhanda and Kulkarni, 1969
- Ixodes (Sternalixodes) hirsti Hassall, 1931
- Ixodes (Sternalixodes) holocyclus Neumann, 1899
- Ixodes hoogstraali Arthur, 1955
- Ixodes howelli Cooley and Kohls, 1938
- Ixodes hyatti Clifford, Hoogstraal and Kohls, 1971
- Ixodes hydromyidis Swan, 1931
- Ixodes (Pholeoixodes) hunanensis Apanaskevich & Duan, 2022
- Ixodes (Afrixodes) hyracis Apanaskevich, Drew & Pienaar, 2025
- Ixodes inopinatus Estrada-Peña, Nava and Petney, 2014
- Ixodes insulae Apanaskevich et al., 2022
- Ixodes jacksoni Hoogstraal, 1967
- Ixodes jellisoni Cooley and Kohls, 1938
- Ixodes jonesae Kohls, Sonenshine and Clifford, 1969
- Ixodes kaiseri Arthur, 1957
- Ixodes kandingensis Guo, Sun, Xu and Durden, 2017
- Ixodes kashmiricus Pomerantzev, 1948
- Ixodes kazakstani Olenev and Sorokoumov, 1934
- Ixodes kerguelenensis André and Colas-Belcour, 1942
- Ixodes kingi Bishopp, 1911
- Ixodes (Scaphixodes) kohlsi Arthur, 1955b
- Ixodes kopsteini (Oudemans, 1926)
- Ixodes kuntzi Hoogstraal and Kohls, 1965a
- Ixodes laguri Olenev, 1929
- Ixodes (Pholeoixodes) lanigeri Hornok, 2024
- Ixodes laridis Heath and Palma, 2017
- Ixodes lasallei Méndez Arocha and Ortiz, 1958
- Ixodes latus Arthur, 1958
- Ixodes laysanensis Wilson, 1964a
- Ixodes lemuris Arthur, 1958
- Ixodes lewisi Arthur, 1965
- Ixodes lividus Koch, 1844
- Ixodes (Haemixodes) longiscutatus Boero, 1944
- Ixodes (Amerixodes) loricatus Neumann, 1899
- Ixodes loveridgei Arthur, 1958
- Ixodes luciae Sénevet, 1940
- Ixodes lunatus Neumann, 1907
- Ixodes luxuriosus Schulze, 1935
- Ixodes macfarlanei Keirans, Clifford and Walker, 1982
- Ixodes malayensis Kohls, 1962
- Ixodes marmotae Cooley and Kohls, 1938
- Ixodes marxi Banks, 1908
- Ixodes maslovi Emel'yanova and Kozlovskaya, 1967
- Ixodes matopi Spickett, Keirans, Norval and Clifford, 1981
- Ixodes mexicanus Cooley and Kohls, 1942
- Ixodes microgalei Apanaskevich, Soarimalala and Goodman, 2013
- Ixodes minor Neumann, 1902
- Ixodes minutae Arthur, 1959
- Ixodes mitchelli Kohls, Clifford and Hoogstraal, 1970
- Ixodes mirzai Apanaskevich & Schenk, 2020
- Ixodes (Ixodes) mojavensis Backus & Beati, 2022
- Ixodes monospinosus Saito, 1967
- Ixodes montoyanus Cooley, 1944
- Ixodes moralesi Apanaskevich et al., 2022
- Ixodes moreli Arthur, 1957
- Ixodes moscharius Teng, 1982
- Ixodes moschiferi Nemenz, 1968
- Ixodes muniensis Arthur and Burrow, 1957
- Ixodes muris Bishopp and Smith, 1937
- Ixodes murreleti Cooley and Kohls, 1945
- Ixodes myospalacis Teng, 1986
- Ixodes myotomys Clifford and Hoogstraal, 1970
- Ixodes (Sternalixodes) myremecobii Roberts, 1962
- Ixodes nairobiensis Nuttall, 1916
- Ixodes nchisiensis Arthur, 1958
- Ixodes nectomys Kohls, 1956a
- Ixodes neitzi Clifford, Walker and Keirans, 1977
- Ixodes nesomys Uilenberg and Hoogstraal, 1969
- Ixodes neuquenensis Ringuelet, 1947
- Ixodes nicolasi Santos Dias, 1982
- Ixodes nipponensis Kitaoka and Saito, 1967
- Ixodes nitens Neumann, 1904
- Ixodes nuttalli Lahille, 1913
- Ixodes nuttallianus Schulze, 1930
- Ixodes occultus Pomerantzev, 1946
- Ixodes ochotonae Gregson, 1941
- Ixodes okapiae Arthur, 1956
- Ixodes oldi Nuttall, 1913
- Ixodes (Coxixodes) ornithorhynchi Lucas, 1846
- Ixodes (Partipalpiger) ovatus Neumann, 1899
- Ixodes pacificus Cooley and Kohls, 1943
- Ixodes (Ixodes) paragibbosus Hornok and Kontschán, 2025
- Ixodes paranaensis Barros-Battesti, Arzua, Pichorim and Keirans, 2003
- Ixodes pararicinus Keirans and Clifford, 1985
- Ixodes pavlovskyi Pomerantzev, 1946
- Ixodes percavatus Neumann, 1906
- Ixodes peromysci Auguston, 1940
- Ixodes persulcatus Schulze, 1930
- Ixodes petauristae Warburton, 1933
- Ixodes (Scaphixodes) philipi Keirans and Kohls, 1970
- Ixodes pilosus Koch, 1844
- Ixodes planiscutatus Apanaskevich & Schenk, 2020
- Ixodes pomerantzevi Serdjukova, 1941
- Ixodes pomerantzi Kohls, 1956
- Ixodes priscicollaris Schulze, 1932
- Ixodes procaviae Arthur and Burrow, 1957
- Ixodes prokopjevi (Emel'yanova, 1979)
- Ixodes radfordi Kohls, 1948
- Ixodes rageaui Arthur, 1958
- Ixodes randrianasoloi Uilenberg and Hoogstraal, 1969b
- Ixodes rasus Neumann, 1899
- Ixodes redikorzevi Olenev, 1927
- Ixodes rhabdomysae Arthur, 1959
- Ixodes ricinus (Linnaeus, 1758)
- Ixodes rio Apanaskevich et al., 2022
- Ixodes robbinsi Apanaskevich et al., 2022
- Ixodes rothschildi Nuttall and Warburton, 1911
- Ixodes rotundatus Arthur, 1958
- Ixodes (Afrixodes) rubicundus Neumann, 1904
- Ixodes rubidus Neumann, 1901
- Ixodes rugicollis Schulze and Schlottke, 1929b
- Ixodes rugosus Bishopp, 1911
- Ixodes sachalinensis Filippova, 1971
- Ixodes scapularis Say, 1821
- Ixodes schillingsi Neumann, 1901
- Ixodes schulzei Aragão and Fonseca, 1951
- Ixodes sculptus Neumann, 1904
- Ixodes semenovi Olenev, 1929
- Ixodes shahi Clifford, Hoogstraal and Kohls, 1971
- Ixodes siamensis Kitaoka and Suzuki, 1983 (Note: Sometimes listed as a synonym of I. ovatus)
- Ixodes sigelos Keirans, Clifford and Corwin, 1976
- Ixodes signatus Birula, 1895
- Ixodes (Trichotoixodes) silvanus Saracho-Bottero, Beati, Venzal, Guglielmone & Nava, 2021
- Ixodes (Pomerantzevella) simplex Neumann, 1906
- Ixodes sinaloa Kohls and Clifford, 1966
- Ixodes sinensis Teng, 1977
- Ixodes (Afrixodes) soarimalalae Apanaskevich & Goodman, 2020
- Ixodes soricis Gregson, 1942
- Ixodes spinae Arthur, 1958
- Ixodes spinicoxalis Neumann, 1899
- Ixodes spinipalpis Hadwen and Nuttall, 1916
- Ixodes spinosus Neumann, 1899
- Ixodes steini Schulze, 1935
- Ixodes stellae Apanaskevich & Schenk, 2020
- Ixodes stilesi Neumann, 1911
- Ixodes stromi Filippova, 1957
- Ixodes subterraneus Filippova, 1961
- Ixodes succineus Weidner, 1964
- Ixodes taglei Kohls, 1969
- Ixodes tamaulipas Kohls and Clifford, 1966
- Ixodes tancitarius Cooley and Kohls, 1942
- Ixodes tanuki Saito, 1964
- Ixodes tapirus Kohls, 1956
- Ixodes (Ixodes) tatei Arthur, 1959
- Ixodes (Endopalpiger) tasmani Neumann, 1899
- Ixodes tecpanensis Kohls, 1956
- Ixodes texanus Banks, 1909
- Ixodes (Trichotoixodes) theilerae Arthur, 1953
- Ixodes thomasae Arthur and Burrow, 1957
- Ixodes tinamou Apanaskevich et al., 2022
- Ixodes tiptoni Kohls and Clifford, 1962
- Ixodes tovari Cooley, 1945
- Ixodes transvaalensis Clifford and Hoogstraal, 1966
- Ixodes (Filippoviella) trianguliceps Birula, 1895
- Ixodes (Sternalixodes) trichosuri Roberts, 1960
- Ixodes tropicalis Kohls, 1956a
- Ixodes (Trichotoixodes) turdus Nakatsudi, 1942
- Ixodes ugandanus Neumann, 1906
- Ixodes (Afrixodes) uilenbergi Apanaskevich & Goodman, 2020
- Ixodes (Afrixodes) uncus Apanaskevich & Goodman, 2020
- Ixodes unicavatus Neumann, 1908
- Ixodes (Ceratixodes) uriae White, 1852
- Ixodes vanidicus Schulze, 1943
- Ixodes venezuelensis Kohls, 1953
- Ixodes ventalloi Gill Collado, 1936
- Ixodes (Eschatocephalus) vespertilionis Koch, 1844
- Ixodes vestitus Neumann, 1908
- Ixodes victoriensis Nuttall, 1916
- Ixodes walkerae Clifford, Kohls and Hoogstraal, 1968
- Ixodes werneri Kohls, 1950
- Ixodes woodi Bishopp, 1911
- Ixodes (Endopalpiger) woyliei Ash, Elliot, Godfrey, Burmej, Abdad, Northover, Wayne, Morris, Clode, Lymbery and Thompson, 2017
- Ixodes zaglossi Kohls, 1960
- Ixodes (Ixodes) zacateco Apanaskevich & Bunn, 2025
- Ixodes zairensis Keirans, Clifford and Walker, 1982

==== Fossil Species ====
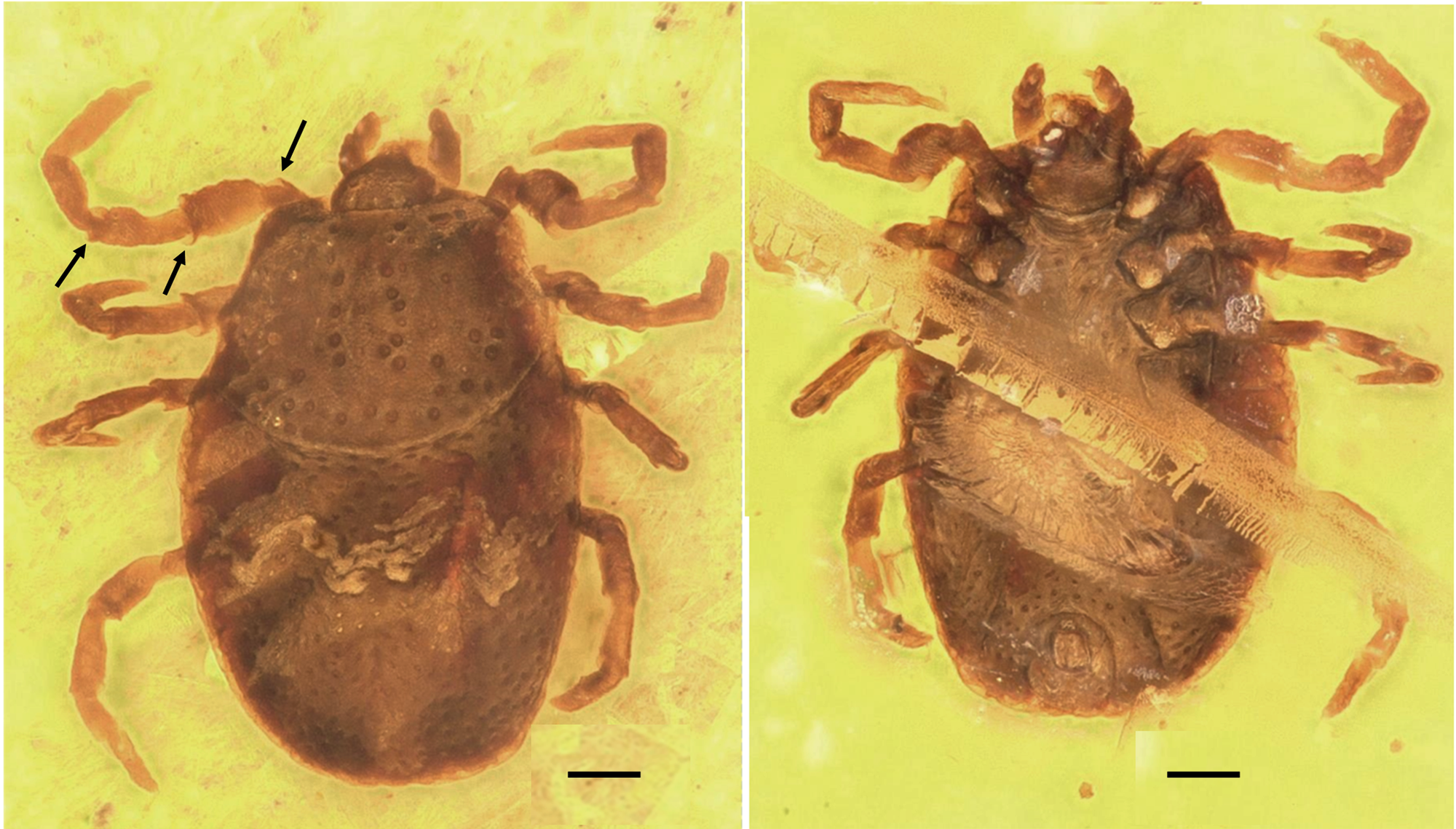
Fossil species Ixodes antiquorum from Burmese amber (~99 Ma)

Three fossil species of Ixodes are known from amber deposits ranging from the Cretaceous to the Eocene:

- †Ixodes antiquorum Chitimia-Dobler, Mans and Dunlop, 2022 (Burmese amber, Cenomanian, ~ 99 Ma)
- †Ixodes succineus Weidner, 1964 (Baltic amber, Eocene, ~ 49–44 Ma)
- †Ixodes tertiarius Scudder, 1885 (Green River Formation, Eocene, 50 Ma) (Note: Ixodes tertiarius is a nomen dubium, and should be excluded from the fossil record)

== Additional Readings ==
Refer to the following external links for recent changes to Ixodes taxonomy:

- Guglielmone AA, Robbins RG, Apanaskevich DA, Petney TN, Estrada-Peña A, Horak IG. Comments on controversial tick (Acari: Ixodida) species names and species described or resurrected from 2003 to 2008. Exp Appl Acarol. 2009 Aug;48(4):311-27. doi: 10.1007/s10493-009-9246-2. Epub 2009 Jan 24. PMID: 19169832.
- Guglielmone, A. A., Robbins, R. G., Apanaskevich, D. A., Petney, T. N., Estrada-Peña, A., & Horak, I. G. (2014a). The Hard Ticks of the World: (Acari: Ixodida: Ixodidae). Springer Netherlands. https://doi.org/10.1007/978-94-007-7497-1
- Guglielmone, A.A., Petney, T.N. & Robbins, R.G. (2020) Ixodidae (Acari: Ixodoidea): descriptions and redescriptions of all known species from 1758 to December 31, 2019. Zootaxa, 4871 (1), 1–322. https://doi.org/10.11646/zootaxa.4871.1.1
