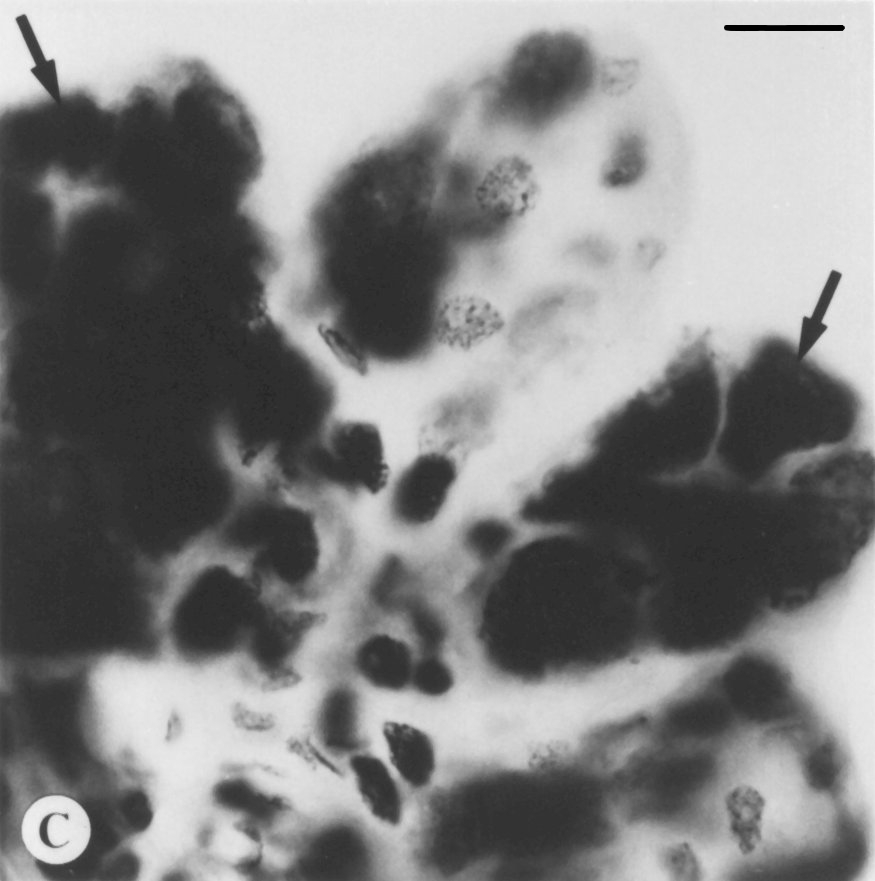
- Black and white Feulgen stained microphotograph depicting intact tick salivary glands infected by deer tick virus. Hypotrophied salivary acinus filled with amorphous masses of pinkstaining (=Feulgen positive) material (arrows). Scale bar = 10 µm.

Virus classification
- (unranked): Virus
- Realm: Riboviria
- Kingdom: Orthornavirae
- Phylum: Kitrinoviricota
- Class: Flasuviricetes
- Order: Amarillovirales
- Family: Flaviviridae
- Genus: Orthoflavivirus
- Subgenus: Euflavivirus
- Species: Orthoflavivirus powassanense
- Virus: Deer tick virus

= Deer tick virus =

Pathogenic member virus of Powassan virus

Deer tick virus
- Prevention: Avoid possible tick-infested areas, such as the woodlands
- Deaths: 2

Deer tick virus (DTV) is a virus in the genus Orthoflavivirus spread via ticks that causes encephalitis.

== Taxonomy ==
DTV closely resembles Powassan virus (to which it has 84% nucleotide sequence identity and 94% amino acid sequence identity). Due to their close similarities, DTV is also called Powassan virus lineage II. The DTV lineage is presumed to be maintained between Ixodes scapularis, or deer ticks, and the white-footed mouse (Peromyscus leucopus).

== Epidemiology ==
DTV has a strong prevalence in the northeastern and north central part of the United States, although little to no human infections have been reported. Only about 1 to 3% of I. scapularis ticks in the northern United States are possibly infected with DTV. This infers that the virus is not seriously pathogenic or it does not easily infect humans. Human incidence might be severely underestimated.

== History ==
In 1997, it was isolated from I. scapularis ticks collected in Massachusetts and Connecticut.

A fatal case of DTV encephalitis occurred at a New York hospital when a 62-year-old man with a meningoencephalitis syndrome, fever, weaknesses in the right arm and leg, and maculopapular rash died from the virus. After an autopsy, his tissues were found to have DTV on a PCR assay. The patient had no history of travel in the days before his admission to the hospital, which implies that the virus might be active in the New York area. He spent times outdoors in woodland areas and had frequent contacts with horses. Lyme disease was commonly reported in the patient's area of residence, showing that tick activity was prevalent in the patient's area (at the time of admission).

In 2017, another fatal case of DTV was documented when a 72-year-old woman was admitted to a hospital in Maine with a fever, low blood pressure, and urination problems. A month before her admission, an I. scapularis tick was removed from her left breast. Another embedded I. scapularis tick was removed from her left scapula only three weeks after the first tick had been removed. She later developed muscle aches, chills, and a rash that is often seen in the early stages of Lyme disease in the same area the tick was removed from. She developed several other concerning symptoms towards the end of her admission at the hospital, which ranged from joint pains to thrombocytopenia. She was given doses of doxycycline and antibiotics (vancomycin and meropenem), which provided no relief to her illness. She later died and a limited autopsy was performed. A severe loss of anterior horn cells within the spinal cord and meningoencephalitis of the brain were discovered. A considerable loss of Purkinje cells was evident in the patient.

== See also ==
- Alkhurma virus
- Louping ill
- Lyme disease
