= Smyth River =

River in New Zealand

Coordinates: 43°13′S 170°51′E

Location
- Country: New Zealand

Physical characteristics
- Mouth
  - location: Wanganui River

The Smyth River is a river of the West Coast Region of New Zealand's South Island. It is an upper tributary of the Wanganui River, which it meets to the west of Mount Whitcombe.

== See also ==
- List of rivers of New Zealand
