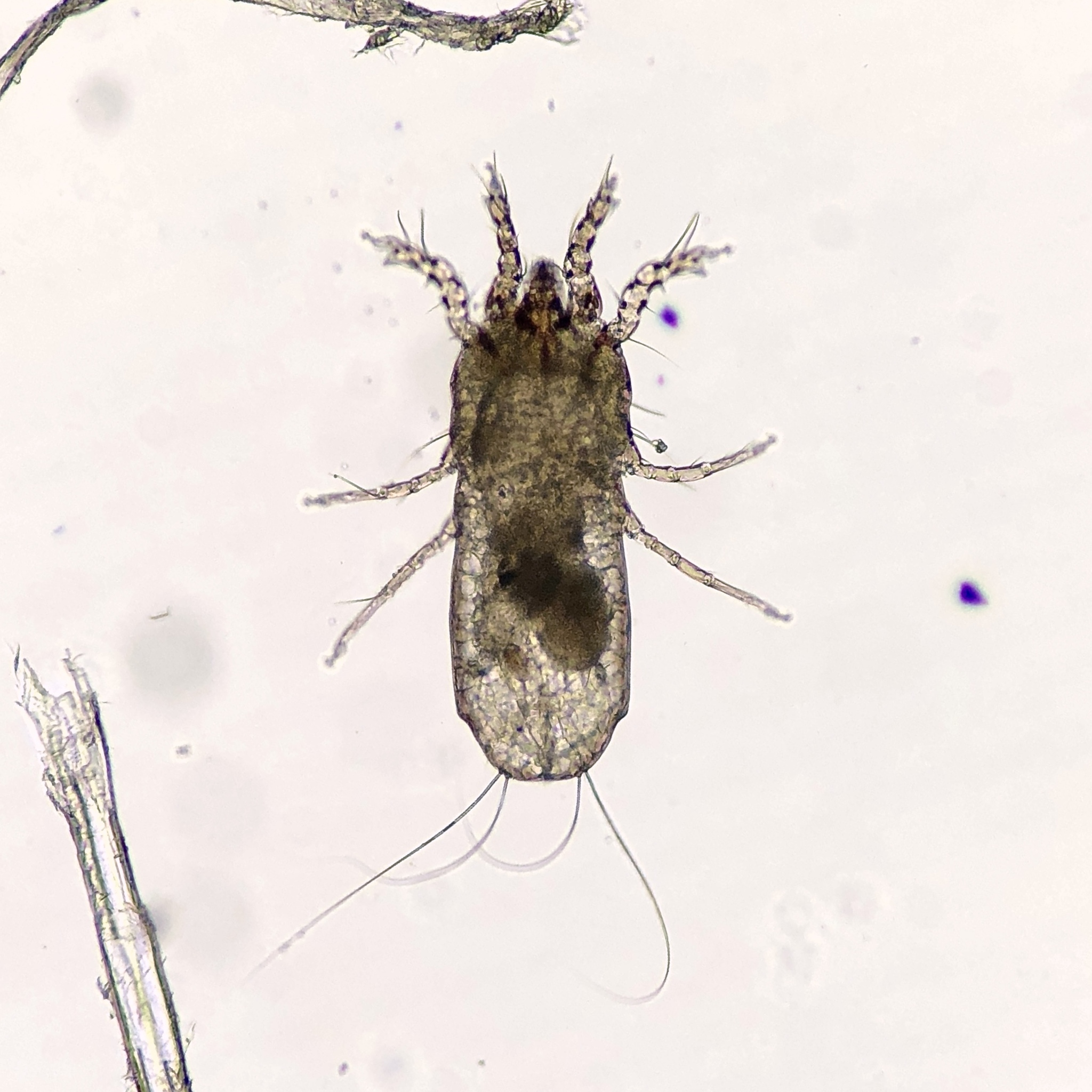

Scientific classification
- Kingdom: Animalia
- Phylum: Arthropoda
- Subphylum: Chelicerata
- Class: Arachnida
- Order: Sarcoptiformes
- Superfamily: Analgoidea
- Family: Analgidae; Trouessart & Mégnin, 1884

Synonyms
- Analgesidae

= Analgidae =

Family of mites

Analgidae is a family of mites belonging to the order Sarcoptiformes. They are found throughout Eurasia and live on in the skin and feathers of certain birds.

== Taxonomy ==
The following genera are recognised in the family Analgidae:

- Analges Nitzsch, 1818
- Analgopsis Trouessart, 1921
- Ancyralges Gaud, 1966
- Anhemialges Gaud & Mouchet, 1959
- Anhimomegninia Mironov, 2009
- Anomalges Gaud, 1972
- Atelanalges Gaud & Atyeo, 1991
- Berlesella Trouessart, 1921
- Bolbomerius Gaud & Atyeo, 1991
- Chelonialges Gaud & Atyeo, 1991
- Crypturalges Gaud, Atyeo & Berla, 1972
- Cypselalges Gaud & Atyeo, 1991
- Diplaegidia Hull, 1934
- Docimeralges Gaud & Atyeo, 1991
- Euschizalges Gaud & Atyeo, 1991
- Hemialges Trouessart, 1895
- Heteralges Gaud & Mouchet, 1959
- Hyperalges Trouessart, 1916
- Kiwialges Gaud & Atyeo, 1970
- Megninia Berlese, 1883
- Megninialges Gaud & Atyeo, 1967
- Megniniella Gaud & Mouchet, 1959
- Metanalges Trouessart, 1919
- Micralges Gaud & Atyeo, 1991
- Pelecyoplus Gaud, 1988
- Phylluralges Gaud & Mouchet, 1959
- Plesialges Trouessart, 1919
- Protalges Trouessart, 1885
- Psoromegninia Gaud, 1960
- Radfordalges Gaud & Atyeo, 1967
- Scleralges Gaud & Atyeo, 1991
- Scutalges Gaud, 1966
- Strelkoviacarus Dubinin, 1953
- Therisalges Gaud & Atyeo, 1967
- Tillacarus Gaud & Mouchet, 1959
- Typhlalges Gaud, 1965
