= Tick dragging =

Method of wild tick collection

Tick dragging is a ticks collection method used by parasitologists and other researchers studying tick populations in the wild.

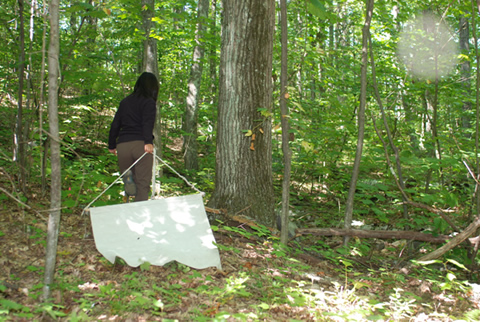
A United States Environmental Protection Agency researcher dragging for ticks.

== Method ==
To conduct a tick drag, a researcher uses a 1-square-metre (11 sq ft) strip of white cloth, usually flannel, denim, or corduroy, mounted on a pole that is tied to a length of rope. The researcher drags the cloth behind themselves through terrain that is suspected of harboring ticks, working in a grid-like pattern. They may also "flag" low-lying bushes and other vegetation by waving the cloth over them.

Tick dragging is one of several methods of harvesting wild ticks for study in the lab. In at least one trial, the tick dragging method proved more successful than more technologically innovative techniques, such as live-baited traps and CO_{2}-baited traps.

The dragging method is a useful way to collect ticks from a large area; CO_{2} trapping is another method for localized sampling of ticks. Different species of tick also have variable sensitivity or responsiveness to this form of trapping, so its effectiveness can vary with the species of tick the researcher is interested in sampling.

The dragging method has been tested for its repeatability and reliability. It was concluded that the cloth-dragging technique is useful both for surveying ticks and to estimate and compare abundance between years and areas.

== History ==
The practice of dragging a large white cloth across suspected tick-infested terrain is described in biological field guides from the early 20th century. More sophisticated methods have been developed, but the dragging method continues to be practised by researchers today.

== See also ==
- Insect trap
- Sweep net
