= Ixodes anatis =

Scientific classification
- Kingdom: Animalia
- Phylum: Arthropoda
- Subphylum: Chelicerata
- Class: Arachnida
- Order: Ixodida
- Family: Ixodidae
- Genus: Ixodes
- Species: I. anatis

Binomial name
- Ixodes anatis Chilton, 1904

Species of tick parasitic on kiwi

Ixodes anatis, also called the kiwi tick, is a species of tick in the arthropod family Ixodidae. It is endemic to New Zealand and mainly parasitizes kiwi (family Apterygidae).

== Taxonomy ==
Ixodes anatis Chilton (1904), also called the kiwi tick, is a species of tick endemic to New Zealand.

The species was originally described by Charles Chilton in 1904. It was given the name anatis because the first specimens were collected from a grey duck. The type specimens are housed at Canterbury Museum, Christchurch, New Zealand (CMNZ).

Since its original description, the morphology of I. anatis has only been partially described and characterized. All stages of the species were recently re-described and illustrated.

== Hosts ==
Ixodes anatis has a high host specificity and mainly parasitizes the North Island brown kiwi (Apteryx mantelli) and the tokoeka (Apteryx australis). There are a handful of records that show it may have also been found on certain species of waterfowl. It is considered to be an endophilous and nidicolous species, which means it lives within the burrows and nests of its host, the kiwi.

== Conservation status ==
Ixodes anatis is currently listed as "Not Threatened" in "Conservation status of parasitic mites and ticks (Acari) in New Zealand, 2021". Although it was previously considered to be Threatened – Nationally Vulnerable, and although its bird hosts are threatened, a better understanding of its populations has led to an improved conservation status.
