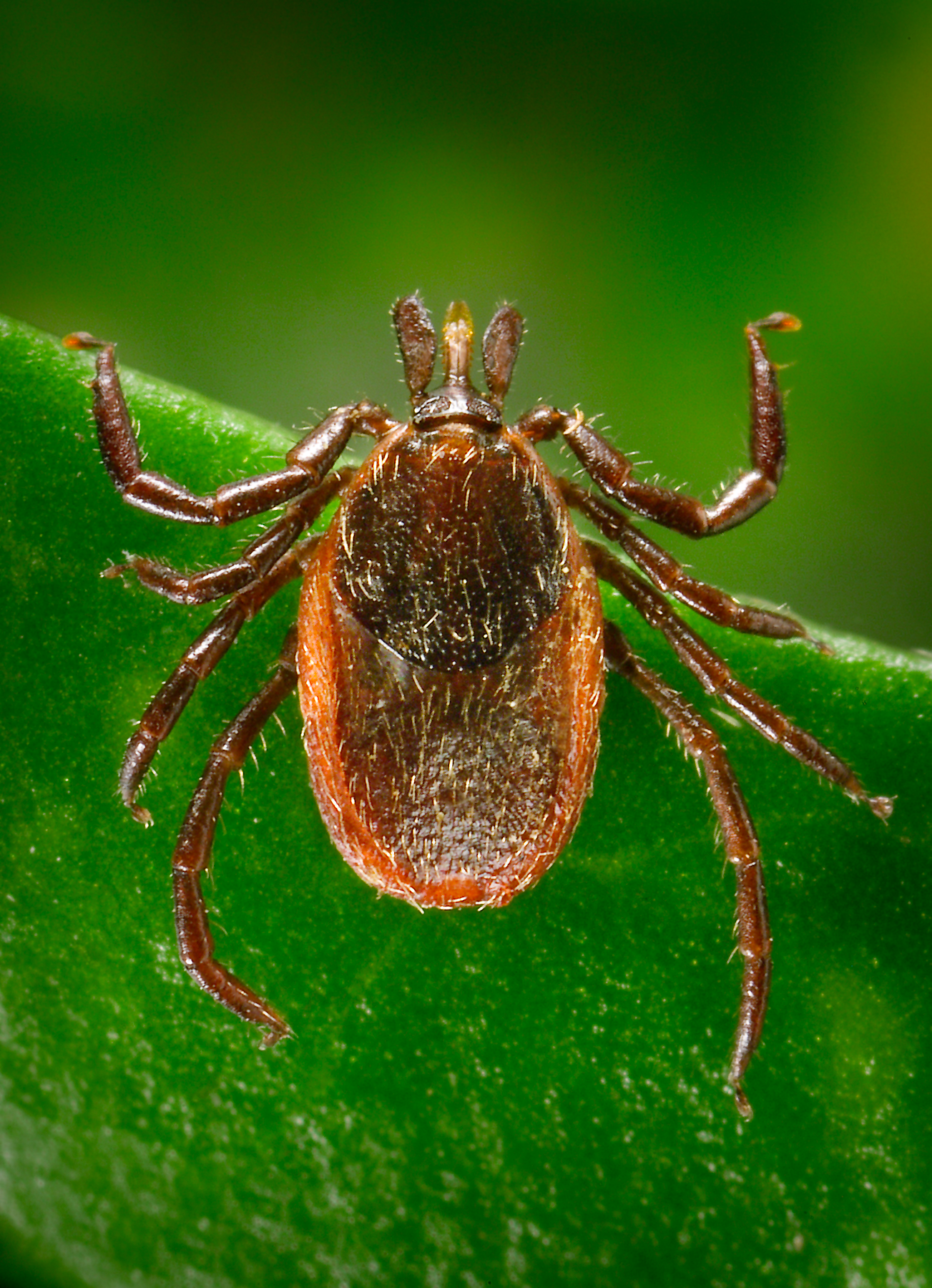
- Adult female western black-legged tick

Scientific classification
- Kingdom: Animalia
- Phylum: Arthropoda
- Subphylum: Chelicerata
- Class: Arachnida
- Order: Ixodida
- Family: Ixodidae
- Genus: Ixodes
- Species: I. pacificus

Binomial name
- Ixodes pacificus Cooley & Kohls, 1943

= Ixodes pacificus =

Species of arachnid

Ixodes pacificus, the western black-legged tick, is a species of tick found on the western coast of North America. The western black-legged tick is a hard tick, i.e., a member of the family Ixodidae. The larvae and nymphs typically feed on lizards and small mammals, while adults typically feed on deer. It is an ectoparasite that attaches itself to the outside of its host and feeds on the host's blood. It can have a heteroxenous lifestyle or monoxenous life cycle depending on how many hosts it feeds on in each cycle. I. pacificus has a four-stage life cycle that takes around 3 years to complete; these stages include egg, larva, nymph, and adult. They prefer dense woodland habitats or areas of brush and tall grass.

It is the principal vector of Lyme disease in that region, while the deer tick, Ixodes scapularis, is the vector to the east.

== Description ==
Belonging to the family Ixodidae, the western black-legged tick is considered a slow-feeding hard tick which possesses a plated body armor. It is primarily found in the western region of the United States, particularly in northern California, and in western Canada.

An adult male is around 2.54 mm in size, oval-shaped, and brownish-black in color. Due to the presence of a hard plate or scutum that completely covers the dorsal side of the male, they are unable to feed in large quantities. Therefore, males of this species are unable to become engorged.

An unfed adult female is around 3.18 mm in size, has a brown-black scutum on the anterior back, an orange abdomen, and forward-projecting mouth-parts which enable feeding. While feeding, the adult female may engorge and expand to 9.5 mm or longer.

== Range ==
Ixodes pacificus is found in the western region of the United States and in western Canada. Although most prevalent in California, the tick has also been found in five other western states. These include Oregon, Washington, Utah, Nevada, and Arizona. I. pacificus has also been recorded in British Columbia.

== Habitat ==
=== Nymphs ===
Nymphal stage ticks prefer a habitat consisting of dense woodlands with many leaves and areas littered with fir needles. It is most common to encounter western black-legged tick nymphs in areas with large amounts of shed leaves on the ground. This life stage of the tick may be encountered when humans are in direct contact with logs, branches, and shed leaves. These locations are where nymphal ticks seek out hosts.

=== Adults ===
Both adult females and males prefer a habitat with an abundance of short vegetation. They may be found in grasslands, woodland grass, or brush areas. Unlike nymphal ticks, adult western black-legged ticks prefer to climb vegetation and wait for hosts to pass by. As such, these ticks are commonly encountered in open grasslands, at the border of trails in parklands, and in areas that are able to maintain a deer population.

== Life cycle ==
The life cycle of Ixodes pacificus consists of four life stages: egg, larva, nymph, and adult. It takes approximately three years for the tick to complete its life cycle.

Larvae, which emerge from eggs after approximately 53–55 days, take blood meals from vertebrates, such as lizards and birds. Protein from the blood meals, during the 4-10 day feeding period, enable the larvae to transform into immature nymphs after approximately 37–38 days. In order for the nymph to reach the adult stage, they continue to feed for 7–11 days on the blood of vertebrates. After 30 days, an adult tick emerges. Female adults will consume blood meals from medium and large-sized mammals, and then deposit eggs in areas of leaf litter or soil. Female adult ticks can deposit between 790 and 1,300 eggs over a period of 33–40 days.

=== Disease transmission ===
The western black-legged tick is a vector for Lyme disease, which is caused by infection with Borrelia burgdorferi. After feeding on a host animal infected with the bacterium, the tick is then able to transmit it to other animals, including humans, through subsequent blood meals. The nymphal stage, and sometimes adult female ticks, are responsible for the majority of transmission events. Nymphal ticks primarily feed on small animals and humans during the spring and early summer, while adult ticks are most active during the winter and seek out hosts from late fall to spring.

In order for a human to be infected by the bacterium, the tick carrying it must be attached for approximately 36 to 48 hours. Due to the smaller size of the nymphal stage ticks, approximately 2 mm, they are more likely to go unnoticed when attached to a human. This enables a nymph to potentially stay attached longer to the host it is feeding on. For this reason, the nymphal stage is primarily responsible for transmission of Borrelia burgdorferi.

=== Attachment mechanism ===
Once a tick finds itself on its host it will immediately begin to look for an appropriate feeding site. Finding a site to feed typically takes as little as 10 minutes but can last as long as 2 hours. When the tick finds a sufficient feeding location it punctures the skin of its host and inserts a feeding tube that secretes a cementlike substance and has barbs to help the tick to stay attached to the host. Ticks also secrete saliva onto the punctured area that acts as anesthetic so the host will not feel the tick cutting into the skin. This allows the tick to stay attached to the host longer because they go unnoticed by the host. Once a tick is attached it will then feed on the host's blood meal for several days and then detach itself from the host. If the tick was infected with a pathogen it may transmit the infection to the host species through its saliva entering the host's blood stream.
