= Willet =

Conservation status
- Least Concern (IUCN 3.1)

Scientific classification
- Kingdom: Animalia
- Phylum: Chordata
- Class: Aves
- Order: Charadriiformes
- Family: Scolopacidae
- Genus: Tringa
- Species: T. semipalmata

Binomial name
- Tringa semipalmata (J. F. Gmelin, 1789)

Subspecies
- T. s. semipalmata saltmarsh willet; T. s. inornata prairie willet
- Breeding Nonbreeding

Synonyms
- Scolopax semipalmatus J. F. Gmelin, 1789; Symphemia semipalmata (J. F. Gmelin, 1789); Catoptrophorus semipalmatus (J. F. Gmelin, 1789); Totanus semipalmatus (J. F. Gmelin, 1789)

Species of bird

The saltmarsh willet or willet (Tringa semipalmata) is a large shorebird in the family Scolopacidae. It is a relatively large and robust sandpiper and is the largest of the species called "shanks" in the genus Tringa. Its closest relative is the lesser yellowlegs, a much smaller bird with a very different appearance apart from the fine, clear, and dense pattern of the neck, which both species show in breeding plumage. It breeds in North America and the West Indies and winters in southern North America, Central America, the West Indies and South America.

== Taxonomy ==
The willet was formally described in 1789 by the German naturalist Johann Friedrich Gmelin in his revised and expanded edition of Carl Linnaeus's Systema Naturae. He placed it in the genus Scolopax and coined the binomial name Scolopax semipalmata. Gmelin based his description on the "semipalmated snipe" from New York that had been described in 1785 by both the English ornithologist John Latham and by the Welsh naturalist Thomas Pennant. The willet was formerly assigned to the genus Catoptrophorus that had been introduced for the species in 1827 by Charles Lucien Bonaparte. In 2006 it was moved to the current genus Tringa based on a molecular phylogenetic study published the previous year. The genus name Tringa is the Neo-Latin word given to the green sandpiper by the Italian naturalist Ulisse Aldrovandi in 1603 based on Ancient Greek trungas, a thrush-sized, white-rumped, tail-bobbing wading bird mentioned by Aristotle. The specific epithet semipalmata combines the Latin semi- meaning "half" or "small" with palmatus meaning "palmate".

Two subspecies were formerly accepted; these were split in October 2026 and are now treated as two separate species:

- Tringa semipalmata (Gmelin, 1789) (saltmarsh willet or eastern willet): breeds from southern Newfoundland and along the Atlantic coast of the United States into the Gulf of Mexico, including the Caribbean Islands; winters in the West Indies and along the eastern coast of South America as far south as southern Brazil and Argentina. There are very few documented records of this taxon wintering in the United States.
- Tringa inornata (Brewster, 1887) (prairie willet or western willet): breeds from the Prairie Provinces of Canada south to northeastern California, northern Colorado and western Nebraska; winters mainly on the Pacific coasts from the southern United States from coastal S USA to northern South America as far south as northern Chile; some also winter on the Atlantic coast southwards from the southern United States.

It has been suggested that the two subspecies be treated as separate species as there are clear differences in distribution, behavior, morphology, and genetics, but this has only been widely adopted from late 2026.

The willet is a very rare vagrant to Europe with records from the Azores, mainland Portugal, France, Norway and Finland. The Portuguese record from Alcochete near Lisbon on 29 April 2009 showed characteristics of the eastern subspecies.

== Description ==
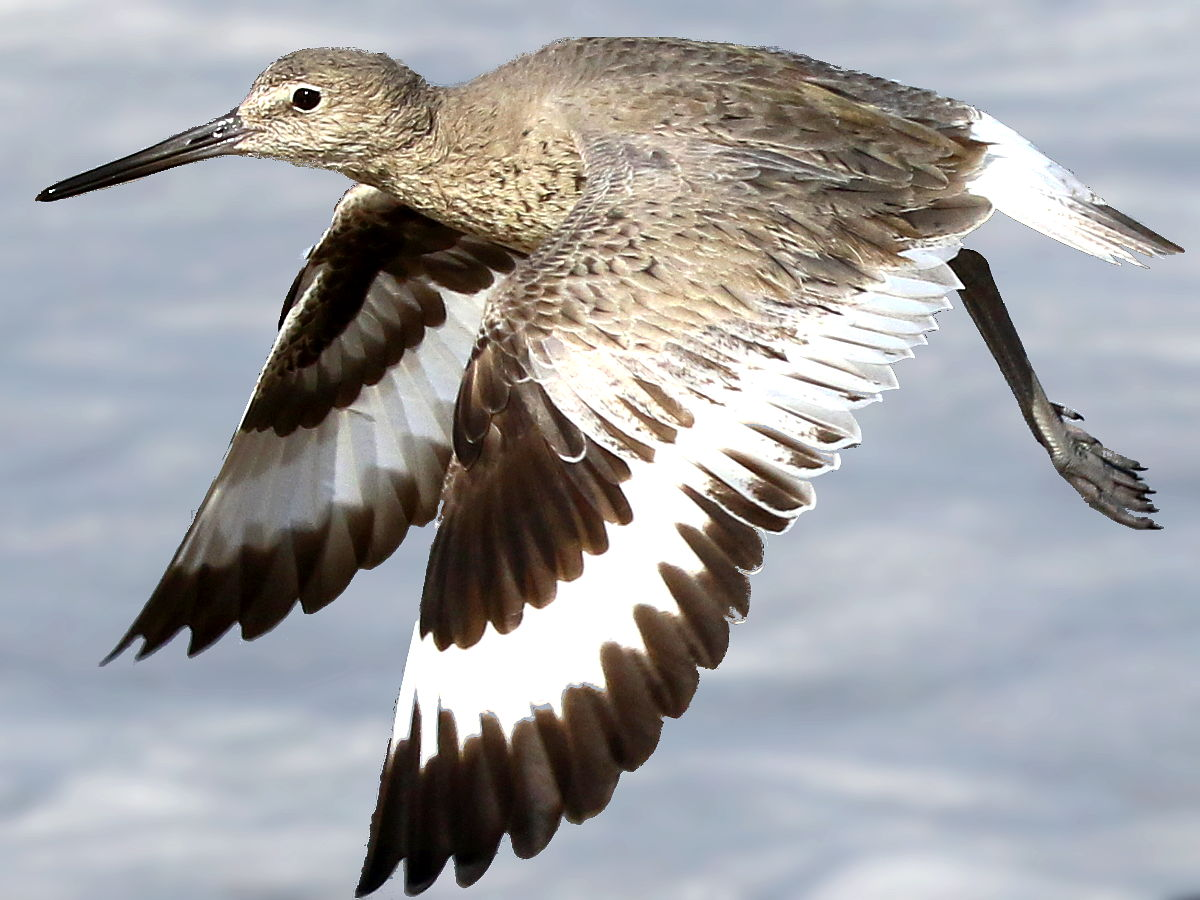
The white wing band is distinctive in flight, both above and below

The willet is a particularly elegant and heavily built shorebird with a structure similar to that of the common redshank but being larger in size than the greater yellowlegs while resembling a godwit in flight with black primary coverts and primaries contrasting with a broad white band, white secondaries with a white rump and gray tail band. With its reclassification into the Tringa genus, it stands as the largest species in this prominent sandpiper genus. It is 31–41 cm (12–16 in) in overall length and weighs 200–330 g (7.1–11.6 oz). The sexes are similar in plumage but the female is slightly larger.

The black underwing coverts may be conspicuous in flight. Willets are identified on the ground by their gray legs and shortish, heavy but straight bill. The plumage is gray above with a white rump, and white below with a distinct white area above the lores and a narrow whitish eye ring giving the bird a spectacled appearance. The underparts are white. In breeding plumage, the bird shows brown barring on the upperparts. Non-breeding birds are plainer.

=== Voice ===
The willet's name is onomatopoeic and refers to its loud piercing "pill-will-willet" territorial song., which is higher pitched and repeated at a faster rate in Eastern willets than in Western birds. Other calls include a predator response call given by breeding birds which is a repeated, staccato "kleep", while non breeding birds alarms include a high, pitched anxious "kip-kip-viek" call and a "kreei" call. They also have a distinctive call when crossing another willet's territory and this "klay-dir" call is also used as a contact call when willets are migrating.

== Distribution and habitat ==
Two subspecies (which may actually be different species) have very different breeding habitats. The eastern willet breeds in coastal saltmarshes while the western willet breeds in freshwater prairie marshes, sloughs, potholes and other inland wetlands. In winter both subspecies are coastal birds being found on both rocky and sandy coasts as well as on mudflats and in coastal marshes.

== Behavior and ecology ==
They are territorial both on the breeding grounds and on the wintering areas but form loose breeding colonies or wintering groups. When displaying the wings are held stiffly and downcurved in flight while on the ground the display gives prominence to the distinctive pattern of the underwings. They are normally vigilant birds, with the birds closer to the landward edge of a saltmarsh being the first to utter their alarm calls, in a manner reminiscent of the common redshank in Europe, although some individuals may be approachable.

=== Food and feeding ===
Willets are flexible in their feeding habits and hunt by walking steadily and pecking prey from the substrate, although they also probe into the mud or silt with their sensitive bill and may actively stalk larger prey in shallow water. A favored prey on the coasts is small fiddler crabs as well as mole crabs, worms, clams and other invertebrates. They have also been known to occasionally eat plant material. Willets also actively hunt more mobile prey such as fish and aquatic insects in the water and will wade up to their bellies to pursue such prey. Prey recorded in western willets during breeding include water scavenger beetles (Hydrophilidae), diving beetles (Dytiscidae), snout beetles (Curculionidae), spiders (Araneae) and fish (Cypriniformes). In winter, western willets have been recorded eating shore crabs (Hemigrapsus), brachyuran crabs (Uca princeps, Leptuca crenulata), crabs (Pachygrapsus), clams (Macoma, Gemma gemma), nereid worms (Neanthes), mussels (Mytilus), whelks (Nassariidae) and others. Eastern willets eat primarily marine coastal prey, including fiddler crabs (Minuca minax, Minuca pugnax, Leptuca pugilator), other crabs (Armases cinereum, Sesarma reticulatum), mole crabs (Emerita talpoida), amphipods (Corophium volutator) and other marine invertebrates. The sensitive bill means that willets can hunt at night as well as during the day. They often use rocks, trees or fence posts to perch on.

=== Breeding ===
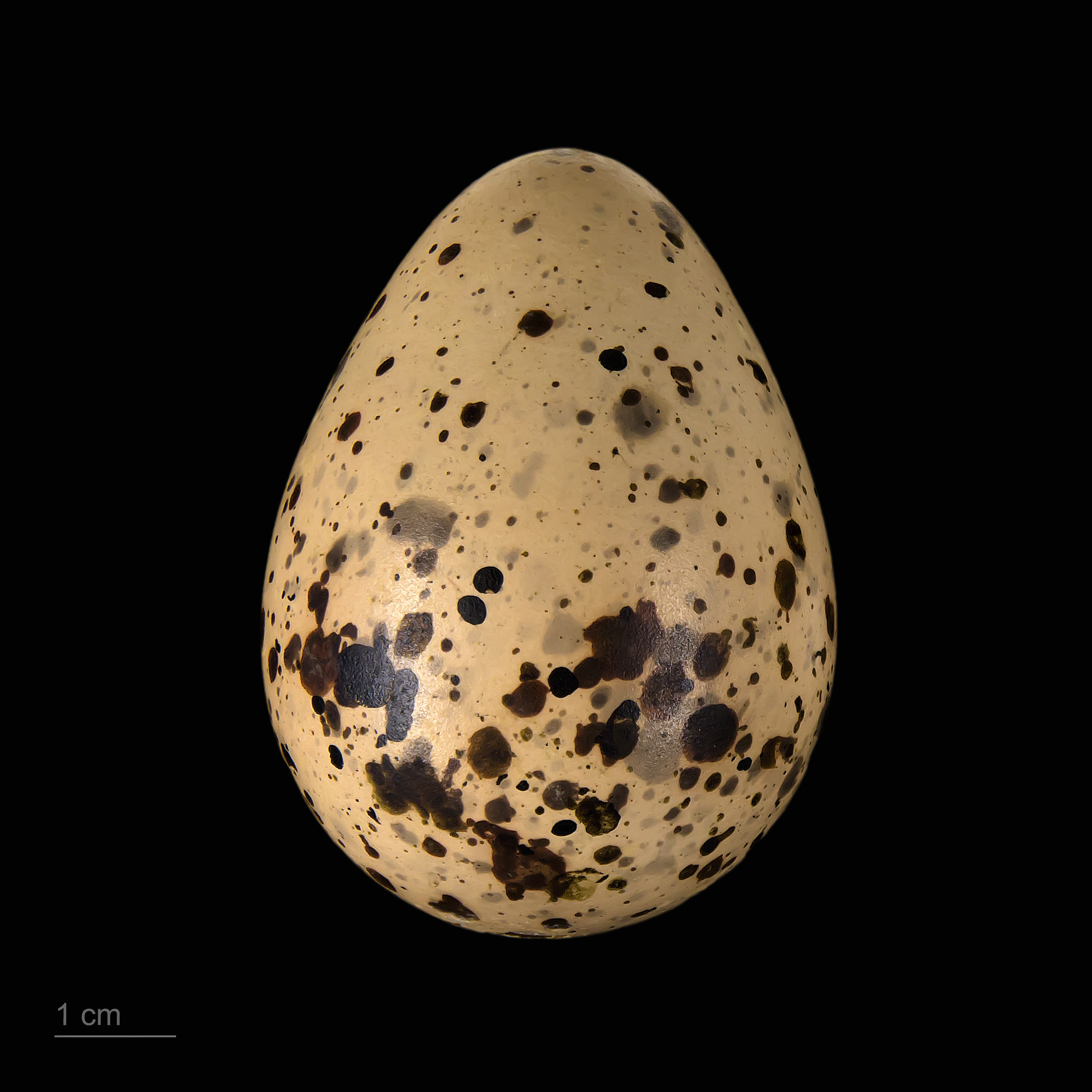
Egg

The male normally leads the female through the territory and creates trial nest scrapes for the female to consider until she selects the site. The nest is a shallow depression scraped out by the birds using their feet and breast, it measures 15 cm across and 5 cm deep. It is placed among grass close to the water's edge in western willets and in saltmarsh or sand dunes in eastern willets. If the nest is placed among grass the female may pull grass stalks over the nest for camouflage. Fine grass leaves and small pebbles may be used to line the nest and grass lining may be brought from some distance where the nest is on bare ground. The male and female may form a long-term monogamous bond and return to the same territory in successive breeding seasons. The male defends the territory from other willets, challenging his neighbors with a ritualized walk along the mutual boundary of their territory, and often this leads to fights. Both sexes incubate the eggs for 22–29 days, although the male tends to incubate at night, the female departs from the territory before the precocial young are fledged leaving them in the care of the male for the last two weeks or so before they fledge.

== Conservation ==
The willet is still common in some parts of its range despite an apparent decline since the 1960s. It is also considered to be a species at risk of becoming threatened or endangered without conservation action. The western subspecies is threatened by the conversion of native grasslands and drainage of wetlands for agriculture while the wintering habitat has been degraded locally in California by coastal development. Willets are also vulnerable to being killed by colliding with power lines laid through their wetland breeding areas. The passage of the Migratory Bird Treaty Act in 1918 protected the willet from intensive exploitation by hunters for food and allowed its numbers to rebound to present levels. There are a total of 250,000 willets in North America, of which 150,000 were counted from the western flyway, and 90,000 in the eastern. Since the Western willet winters in the east, that means that there are probably much less than 90,000 Eastern willets.

== Gallery ==
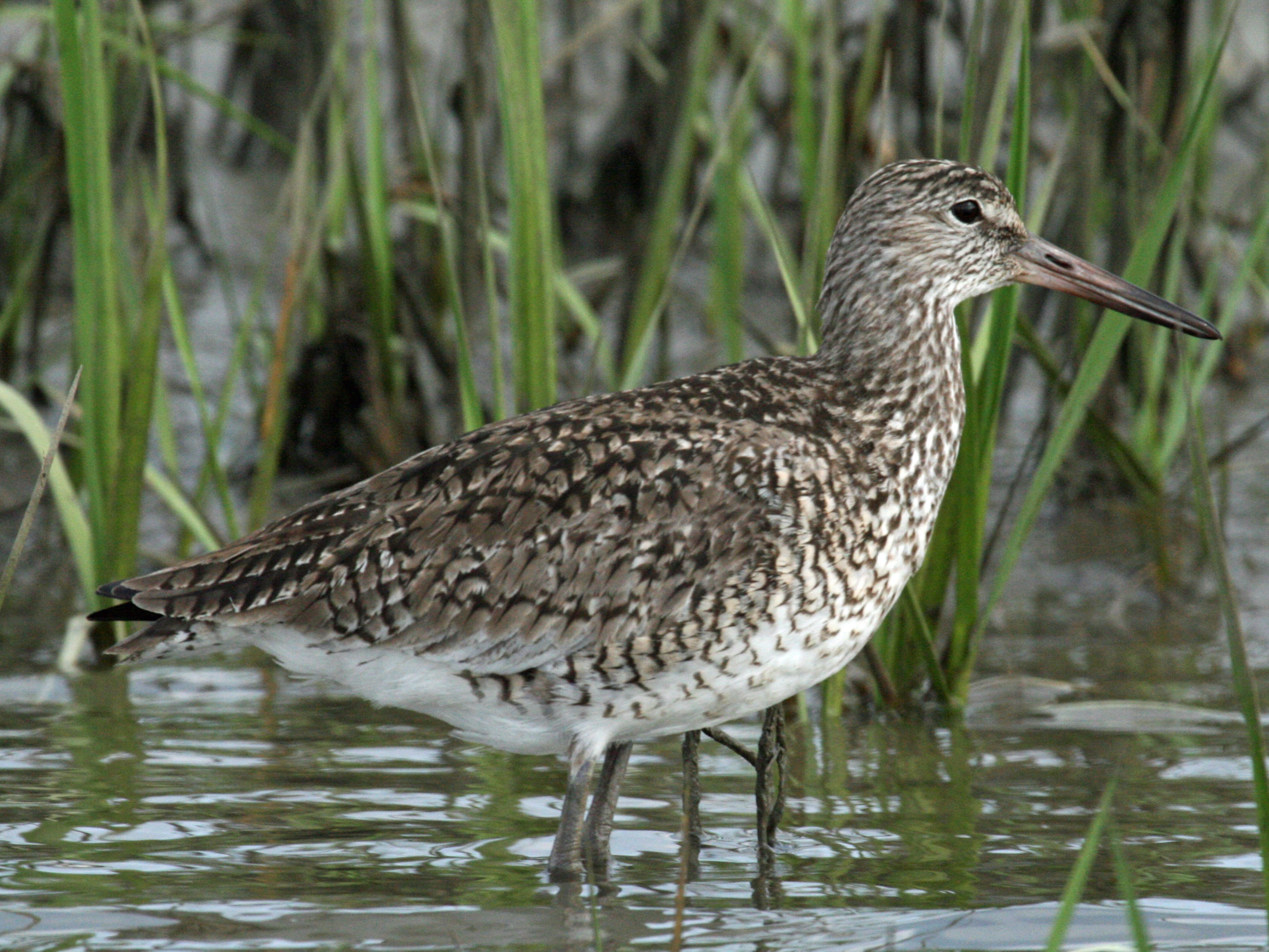
Breeding plumage, North Carolina

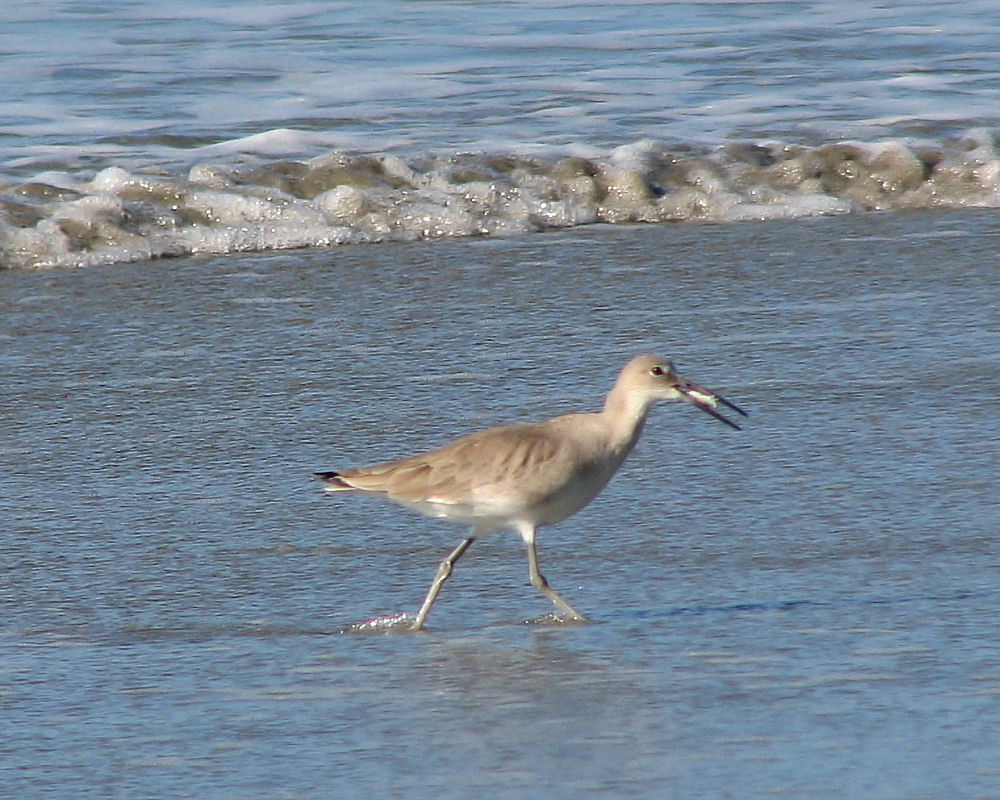
After catching a fish in Manuel Antonio National Park, Costa Rica

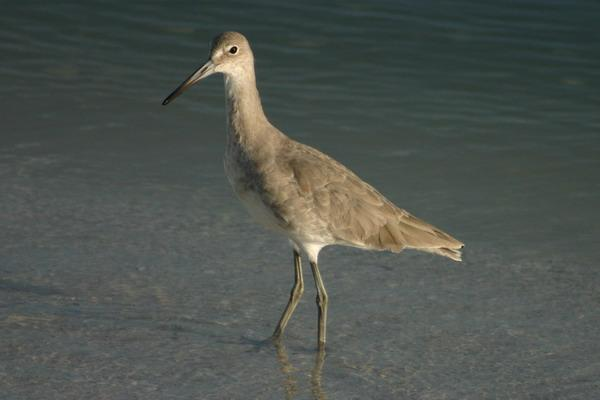
Willet, North Carolina

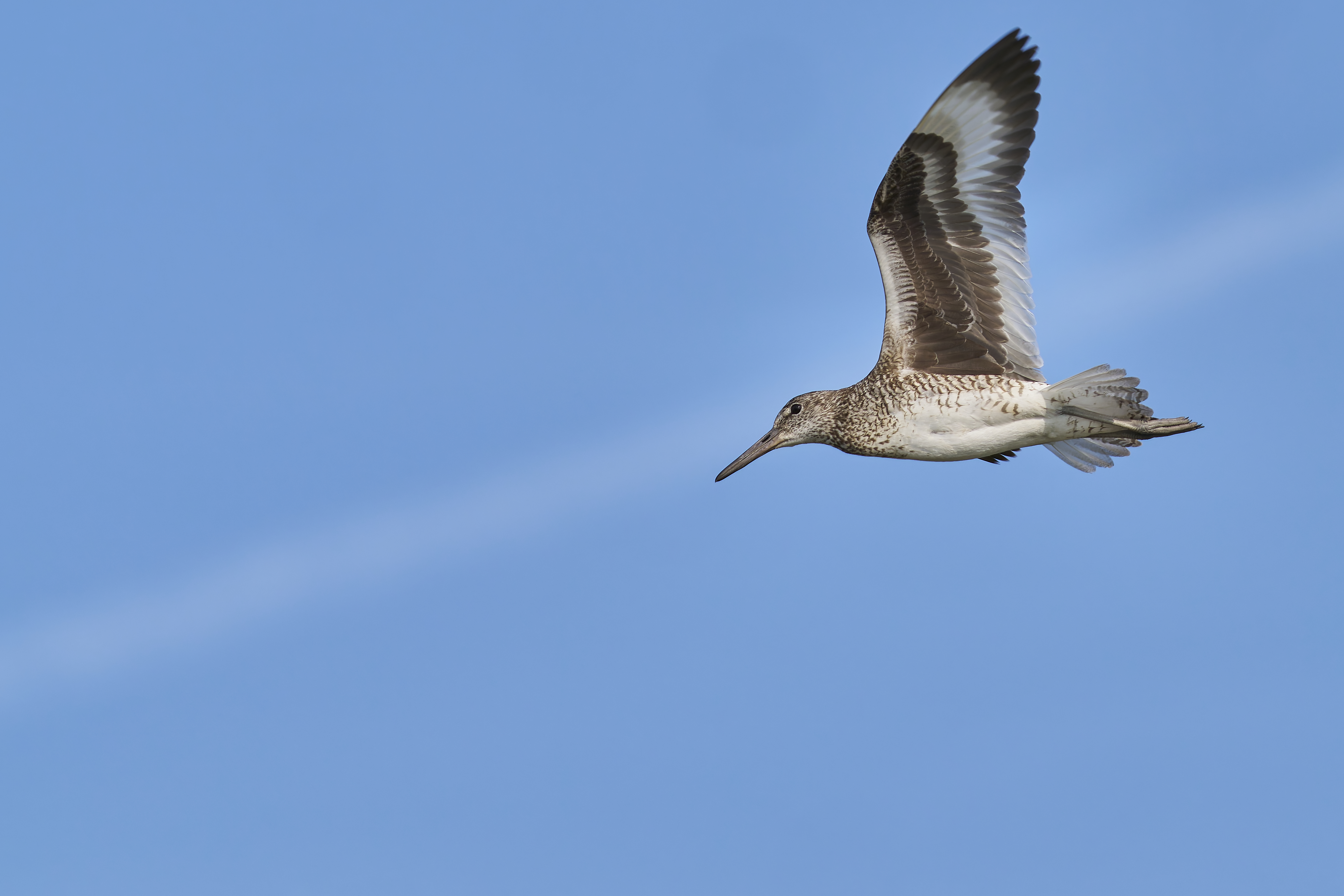
In flight, showing the bold underwing pattern

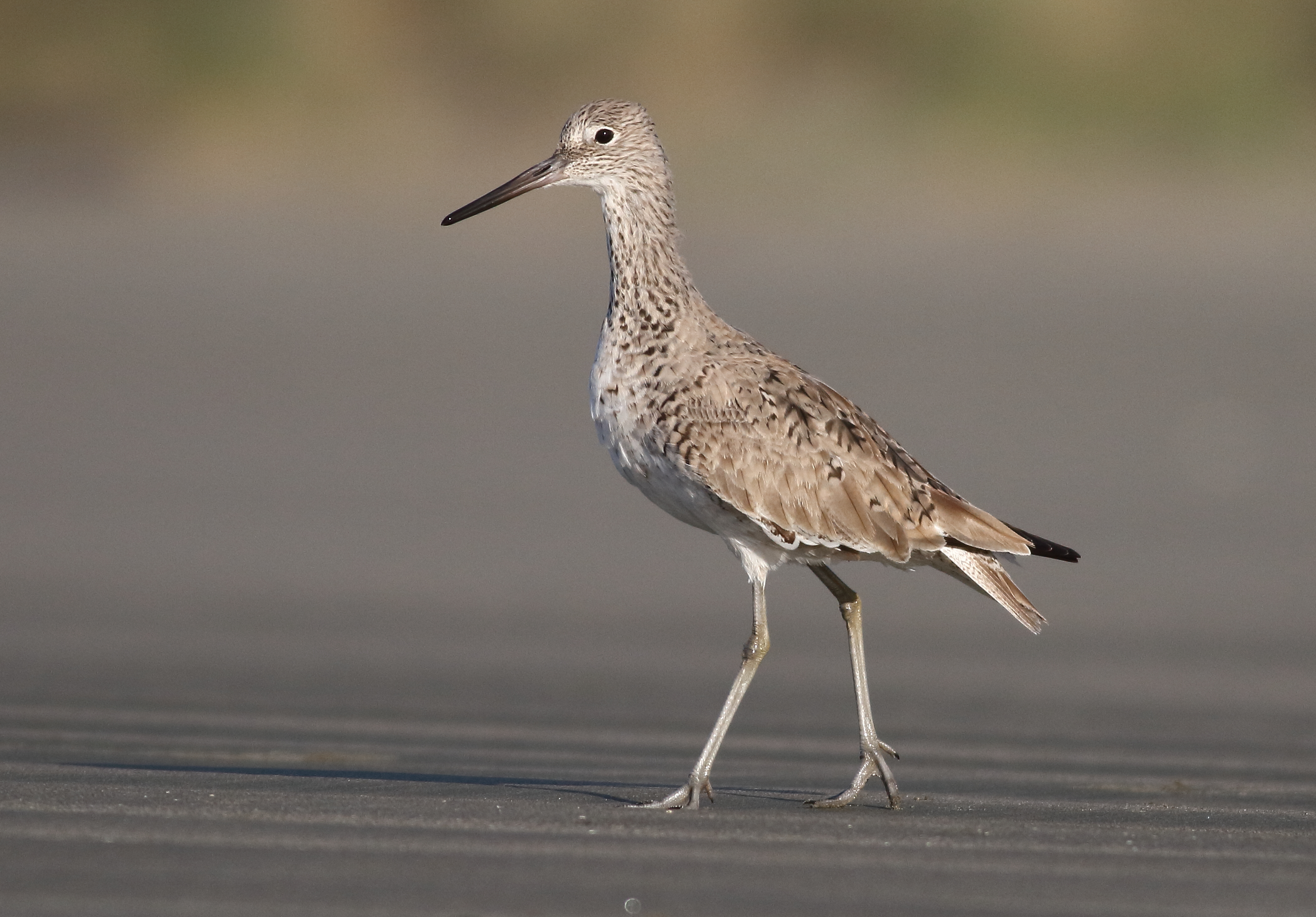
Bodega Bay, California. April 2017.

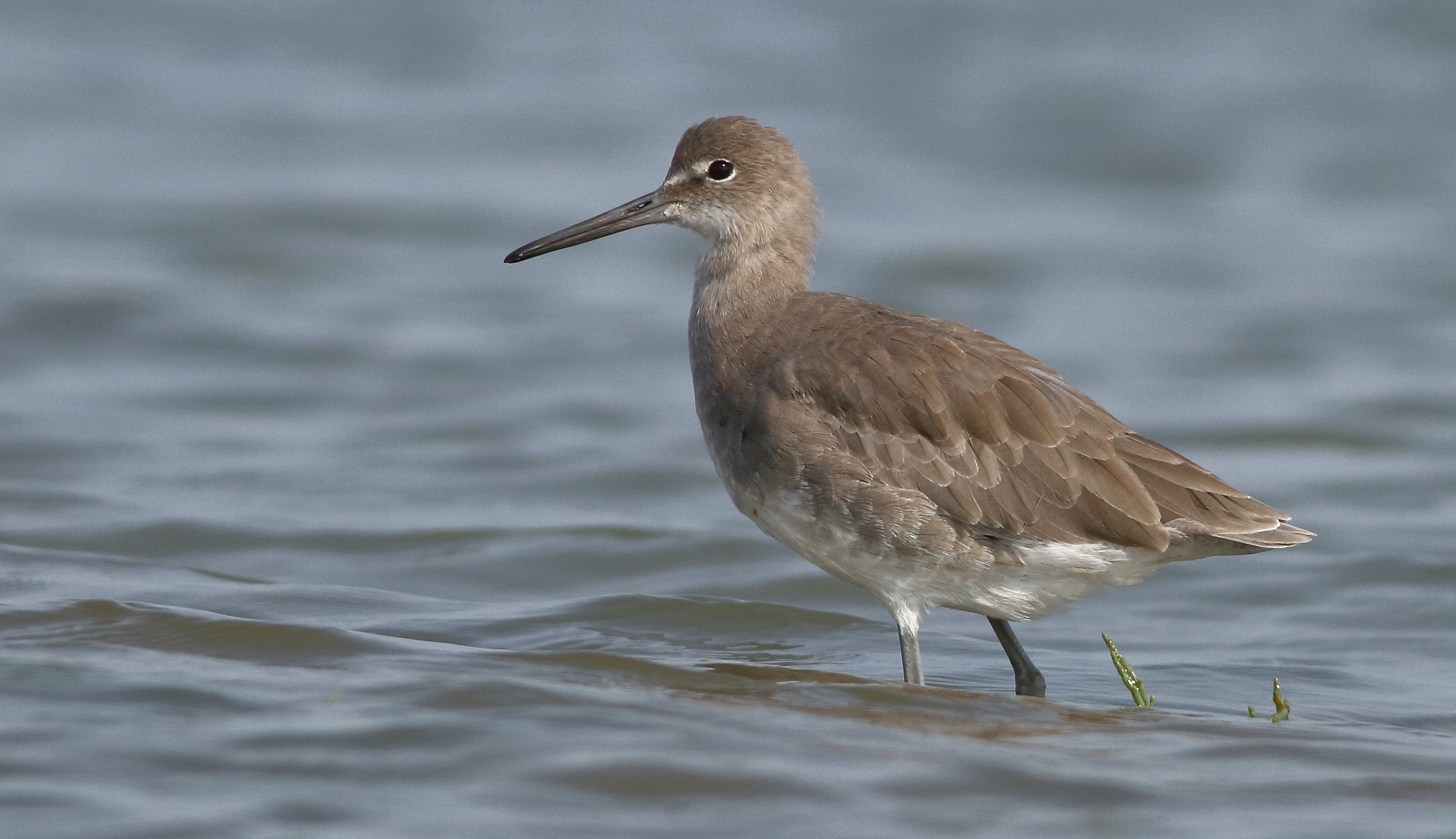
Foster City, California. September 2017.
