= Monocorophium sextonae =

Scientific classification
- Domain: Eukaryota
- Kingdom: Animalia
- Phylum: Arthropoda
- Class: Malacostraca
- Order: Amphipoda
- Family: Corophiidae
- Genus: Monocorophium
- Species: M. sextonae

Binomial name
- Monocorophium sextonae (Crawford, 1937)

Synonyms
- Corophium sextonae Crawford, 1937; Corophium sextoni Crawford, 1937

Species of crustacean

Monocorophium sextonae is a species of amphipod crustacean.

== Description ==
Monocorophium sextonae is 5 mm long.

== Distribution and habitat ==
Monocorophium sextonae is native to New Zealand, but was introduced near Plymouth, UK in the 1930s. In the late 1970 it was introduced to Ireland, possibly by natural means. It can now be found along the European coast from southern Norway to the Mediterranean.

It builds tubes of mud on algae, from shallow water up to 50 m deep.
