= Corophium arenarium =

Scientific classification
- Domain: Eukaryota
- Kingdom: Animalia
- Phylum: Arthropoda
- Class: Malacostraca
- Order: Amphipoda
- Family: Corophiidae
- Genus: Corophium
- Species: C. arenarium

Binomial name
- Corophium arenarium Crawford, 1937

Species of crustacean

Corophium arenarium is a small (up to 7 mm (0.28 in)) European amphipod crustacean of the family Corophiidae. It looks very similar to C. volutator.

It burrows in bottom sediments, between 10 and 60 m (33 and 197 ft) deep.

Corophium arenarium originates from the coasts of France and the North Sea.
