= Crassicorophium bonellii =

Scientific classification
- Kingdom: Animalia
- Phylum: Arthropoda
- Class: Malacostraca
- Order: Amphipoda
- Family: Corophiidae
- Genus: Crassicorophium
- Species: C. bonellii

Binomial name
- Crassicorophium bonellii (Milne-Edwards, 1830)

Synonyms
- Corophium bonelli Milne-Edwards, 1830; Corophium bonnelli Milne-Edwards, 1830; Corophium bonnellii Milne-Edwards, 1830

Species of crustacean

Crassicorophium bonellii is a species of amphipod crustacean in the genus Crassicorophium. It produces waterproof silk from its legs as an adhesive in constructing shelter for itself. In a study published in the journal Naturwissenschaften, it was found that silk is produced in a fashion very similar to spiders.

It has been suggested by Dr Fritz Vollrath of Oxford University that Crassicorophium silk's tolerance of salt water means it might find uses in medical applications where it would come into contact with salty bodily fluids.
