= Corophium multisetosum =

Scientific classification
- Domain: Eukaryota
- Kingdom: Animalia
- Phylum: Arthropoda
- Class: Malacostraca
- Order: Amphipoda
- Family: Corophiidae
- Genus: Corophium
- Species: C. multisetosum

Binomial name
- Corophium multisetosum Stock, 1952

Species of crustacean

Corophium multisetosum is a small (up to 9mm) European amphipod crustacean of the family Corophiidae.

It builds mud burrows in clay or sand in fresh or weakly brackish habitats.

Corophium multisetosum occurs on coasts of the Netherlands, France, Germany, Poland and the British Isles.
