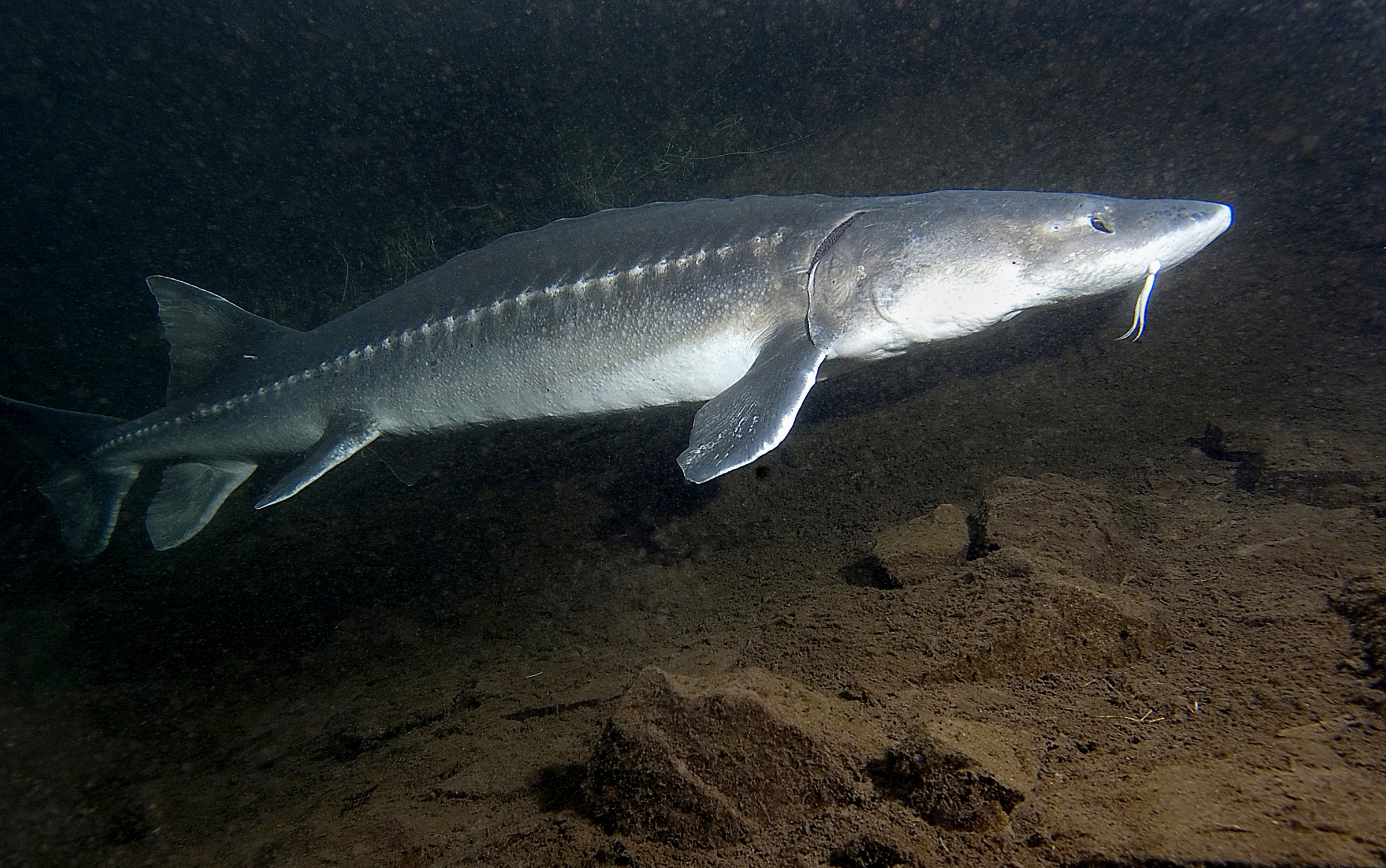
- A white sturgeon at the Oregon Department of Fish and Wildlife's Sturgeon Center at Bonneville Dam on the Columbia River.

Conservation status
- Vulnerable (IUCN 3.1)
- CITES Appendix II

Scientific classification
- Kingdom: Animalia
- Phylum: Chordata
- Class: Actinopterygii
- Order: Acipenseriformes
- Family: Acipenseridae
- Genus: Sinosturio
- Species: S. transmontanus

Binomial name
- Sinosturio transmontanus (Richardson, 1836)

Synonyms
- Acipenser transmontanus Richardson, 1836

= White sturgeon =

Species of fish

White sturgeon (Sinosturio transmontanus) is a species of sturgeon in the family Acipenseridae of the order Acipenseriformes. They are an anadromous (migratory) fish species ranging in the Eastern Pacific; from the Gulf of Alaska to Monterey, California. However, some are landlocked in British Columbia, the Fraser River and Columbia River, Montana, Snake River, and Clearwater River in Idaho, and Lake Shasta in California, with reported sightings in northern Baja California, Mexico.

== Taxonomy ==
Prior to 2025, it was placed in the genus Acipenser. However, this placement was long known to be paraphyletic. In 2025, it was moved to the revived genus Sinosturio, though this change is not universally supported by sturgeon biologists.

== Description ==
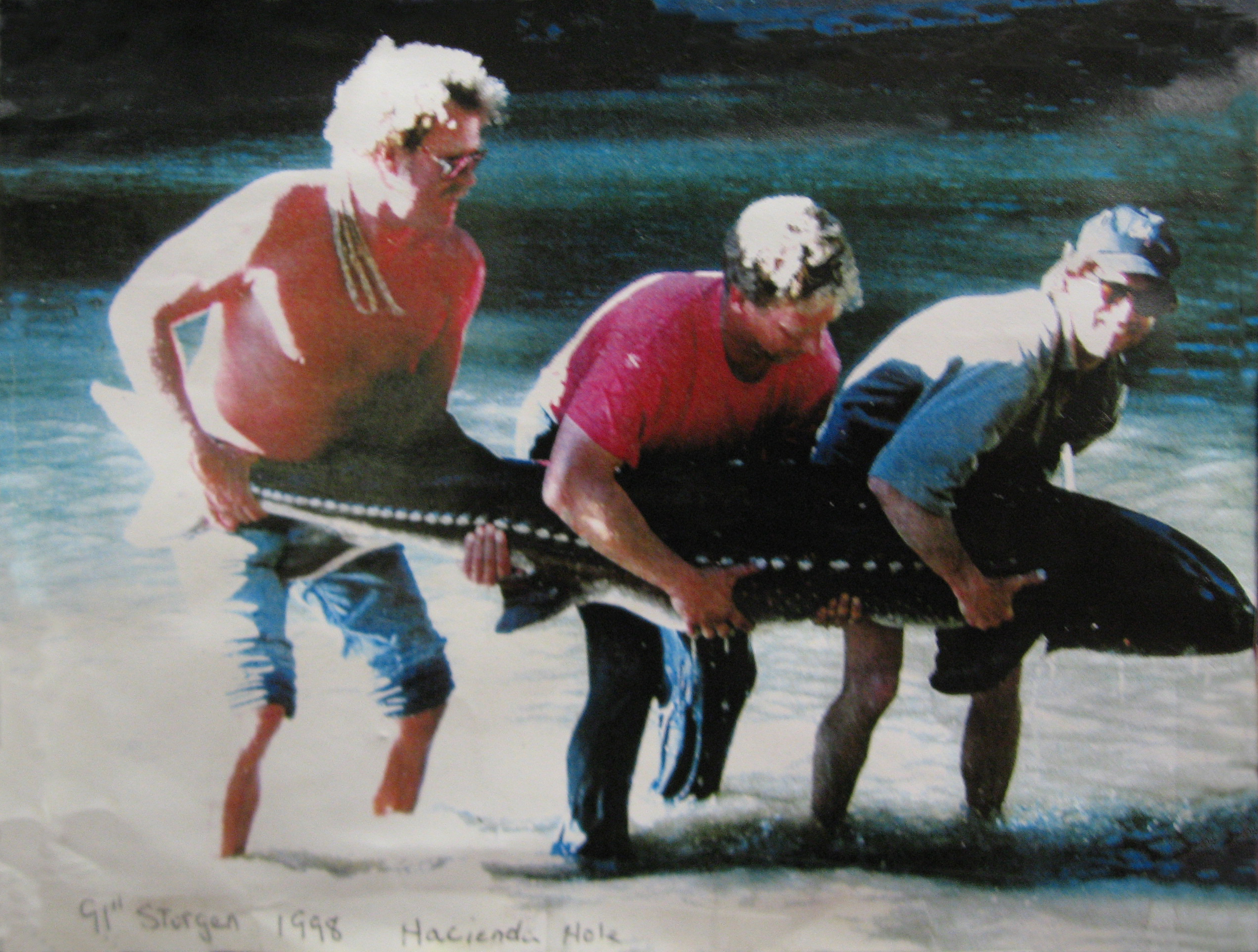
A 7.6 foot long white sturgeon caught in 1998.

S. transmontanus is distinguished by the two rows of four to eight ganoid bony plates between the anus and anal fin, with about 45 rays present in the dorsal fin. Coloring can range from gray to brownish on the dorsal side, paler on the ventral side, and gray fins. Barbels are situated anterior to the mouth, closer to the snout than the mouth.

At sexual maturity, S. transmontanus can reach 1.6 m (5.2 ft) in length, while the maximum length recorded of any age class is 6.1 m (20 ft), with common lengths around 2.1 m (6.9 ft). While age at maturity is uncertain, possible age ranges of known S. transmontanus specimens range from 11 to 34 years old. The most authentic record of the maximum weight of this species is reported to be 630 kg (1,390 lb), while other unauthenticated records show a higher weight estimate, as with the 816 kg (1,799 lb) estimate for an individual with a reported age of 104 years. In one 1995 study, a sample of adults weighed from 34 to 75 kg (75 to 165 lb). A specimen, considered the largest in the state in recent years, of 210 kg (460 lb) at a length of 2.8 m (9.2 ft) was recorded relatively recently in California.

== Taxonomy ==
Alternate common names include: Pacific sturgeon, Oregon sturgeon, Columbia sturgeon, Snake River sturgeon and Sacramento sturgeon. The specific name is derived from the Latin words trans (over or beyond), and montanus (mountain).

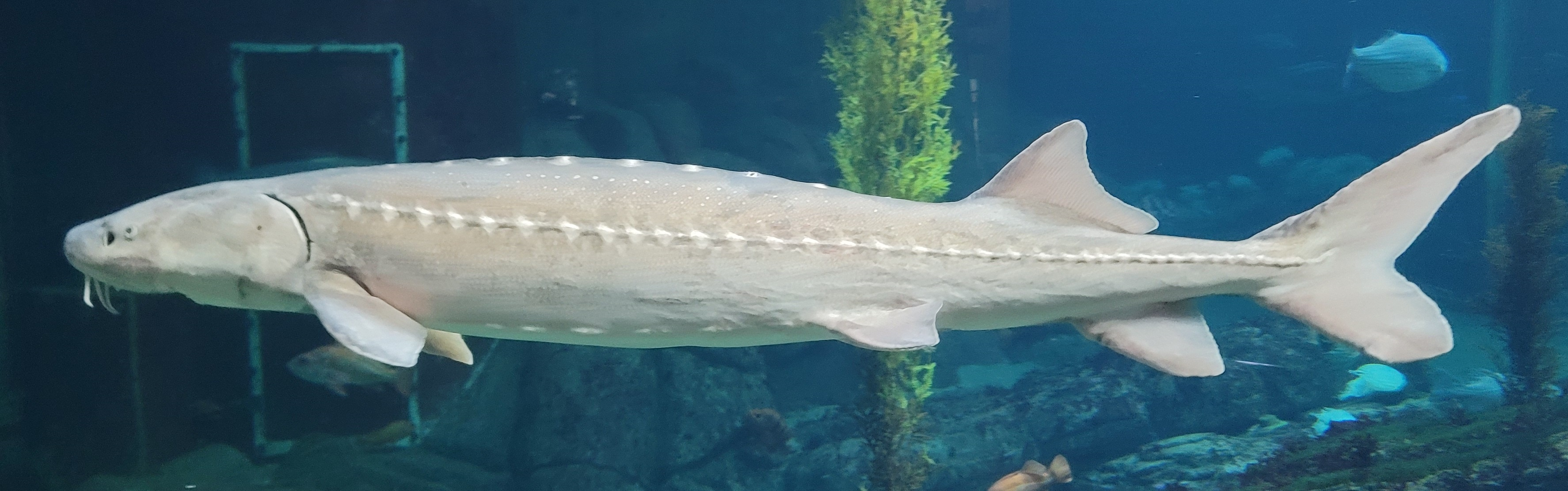
A white sturgeon at the Monterey Bay Aquarium, California

The white sturgeon is part of a Pacific clade of species including Kaluga (Sinosturio dauricus), Sakhalin (Sinosturio mikadoi), Green (Sinosturio medirostris), Chinese (Sinosturio sinensis) and Amur (Sinosturio schrenkii) Sturgeon. Recent genetic analysis supports a close relationship between (S. transmontanus) and (S. schrenckii), which is only found in Asia, showing a common ancestor between the two around 45.8 million years ago. Using microsatellites, genetic differentiation between different river systems in the Pacific Northwest and California is high enough to be able to distinguish between white sturgeon populations and validate a structure in which watershed (S. transmontanus) resides in.

Extant sturgeon species are polyploid, containing more than two paired sets of chromosomes, derived from an extinct ancestor containing 60 chromosomes. Genome duplication during sturgeon evolution has led to three different groups of species with 120, 240, and 360 chromosomes. Recent study of microsatellite inheritance in white sturgeon supports that it is an ancestral octoploid, with 240 chromosomes.

== Distribution and habitat ==
White sturgeon are native to several large North American rivers that drain to the Pacific Ocean. They primarily live in estuaries of large rivers, but migrate to spawn in freshwater, and travel long distances between river systems. Reproducing populations have been documented along the West Coast, from northern Mexico up to the Aleutian Islands in Alaska. White sturgeon are commonly found in deep, soft bottomed areas of estuaries, where movements in the water column is dependent on salinity. Historical ranges have been modified substantially by overharvesting, habitat changes due to dams, and river regulations; all affecting habitat quality, suitability and connectivity.

In the lower Fraser River, British Columbia, movement and abundance are assessed by acoustic tags and mark recapture methods. While the model developed by Robichaud, English and Nelson assumes a closed homogenous population, acoustic tags and mark-recapture data shows that they are sedentary during the winter months and mobile in the spring and fall, with data indicating that they leave the Fraser River and enter the Strait of Georgia during their mobile periods; this conclusion has been validated by microchemical evidence of marine exposure in Fraser River white sturgeon fin rays.

Construction of dams for hydroelectric power production affects seasonal movement of white sturgeon in many river systems, with the Columbia River Basin being a large contributor to shifts in the distribution and movement. The dams present in the basin have largely blocked the upstream movement of sturgeon, due to designs of fish ladders being more specified for salmon and steelhead. While downstream passage of sturgeon through the dams has been reported, the route of passage was never identified. Downstream movement through the dams are only possible through operating turbines, open spill gates and the ice and trash sluiceway.

== Diet ==
Larval white sturgeon 10–11 mm (0.39–0.43 in) in TL experience the highest mortality when they transition from endogenous to exogenous feeding, around 8–14 days post-hatch depending on conditions. Once larvae metamorphose into young of the year (YOY) and juveniles, they actively feed on the substrate, dominantly Corophium spp., relying on water currents to carry them downriver to areas of suitable food. The availability of Corophium spp. could play a key role in the survival of larval and YOY white sturgeon in the Columbia River and could possibly explain the apparent poor survival of larvae and YOY in some Snake and Columbia River reservoirs that apparently have successful spawning but poor recruitment. Juveniles less than 600 mm (2.0 ft) TL are known to feed on tube-dwelling amphipods, mysids, isopods, Corophium spp, and other benthic invertebrates, as well as on the eggs and fry of other fish species. Adults greater than 600 mm (2.0 ft) consume a variety prey species, adjusting to a piscivorous diet of herring, shad, starry flounder, goby, smelt, anchovy, lamprey, and salmon, as well as benthic items such as invasive overbite clam. With feeding movements influenced due to tidal cycles, studies show more active movement at night, hinting that white sturgeon may be nocturnal foragers.

Studies have shown that dietary lipid requirements on larval white sturgeon effect overall body composition, plasma biochemical parameters and liver fatty acids. With increasing dietary lipid levels, whole body and muscle lipid content increases, as well as increased plasma triglycerides and cholesterol content. This shows that larval sturgeon post-hatch grow faster on high lipid diets, reducing glycogen stores but increasing stores of lipid in the liver. The importance of this can help to understand growth rates in changing environments with varying food sources.

== Reproduction ==
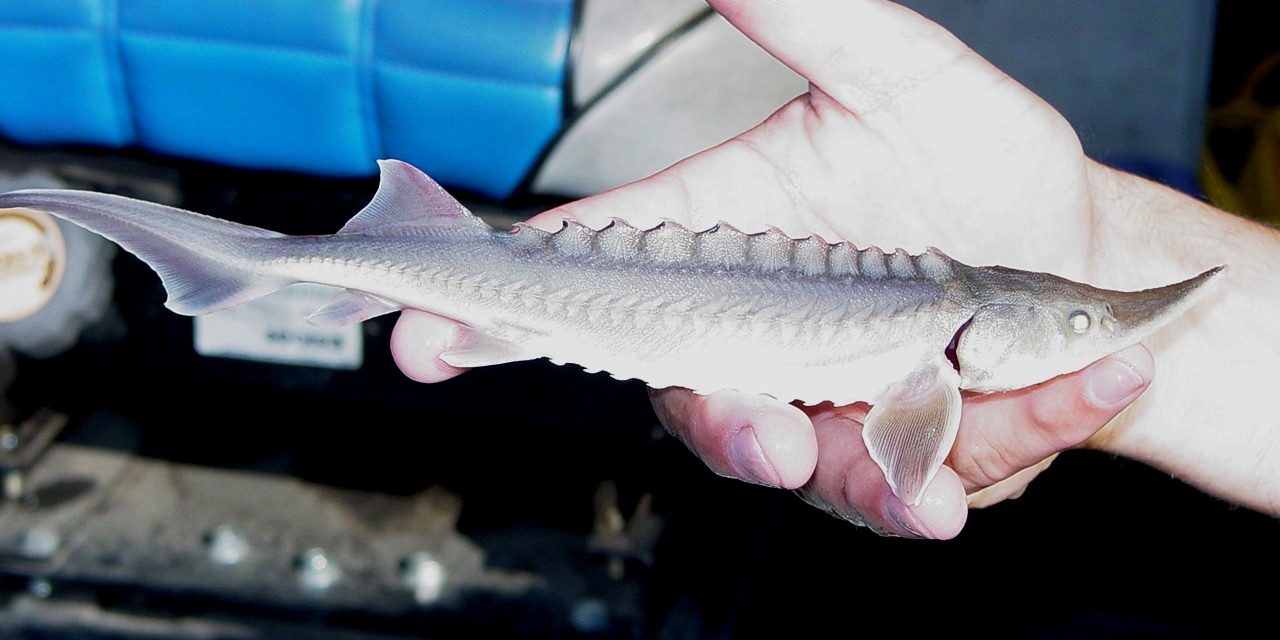
A juvenile white sturgeon

"White sturgeons are iteroparous breeders with a spawning period in the Sacramento and San Joaquin Rivers between mid-February to late May, with peak activity during March and April" - Kohlhorst 1976.

There is much uncertainty around reproduction timing of events in white sturgeon, with many papers reporting differing results dependent on the river system observed. Chapman, Van Enennaam and Doroshov witnessed sexually mature females 950 mm (3.12 ft) FL in the Sacramento-San Joaquin River system estimated around nine years old by using the Von Bertalanffy growth function, while the youngest sexual mature was a male 750 mm (2.46 ft) FL estimated to be six years old. However, other reports have sexual maturity for white sturgeon at twelve years old for females and ten years old for males. Uncertainty around age estimates from fin ray annulus may account for any disparity.

Spawning periodicity is thought to be two to four years for females and one to two years for males. Behavior during spawning is not well known, but it is known that they are communal broadcast spawners, where a female's eggs are fertilized by many males. When ready to spawn, white sturgeon choose a variety of substrates dependent on the river system, spawning on gravel or rocky substrate in moderate to fast currents, with observed depths of 3–23 m (9.8–75.5 ft), and water velocities at the bottom on a range of 0.6-2.4 m/sec. When eggs are released by the female, they are negatively buoyant, and develop an adhesive coat upon contact with water, which allows them to attach to the substrate near where they were spawned. Hatching time is temperature dependent, and can range from 3–13 days. Optimal temperature is between 14 and 16 °C (57 and 61 °F), with mortality observed below 8 °C (46 °F) and above 2 °C (36 °F).

== Importance to humans ==
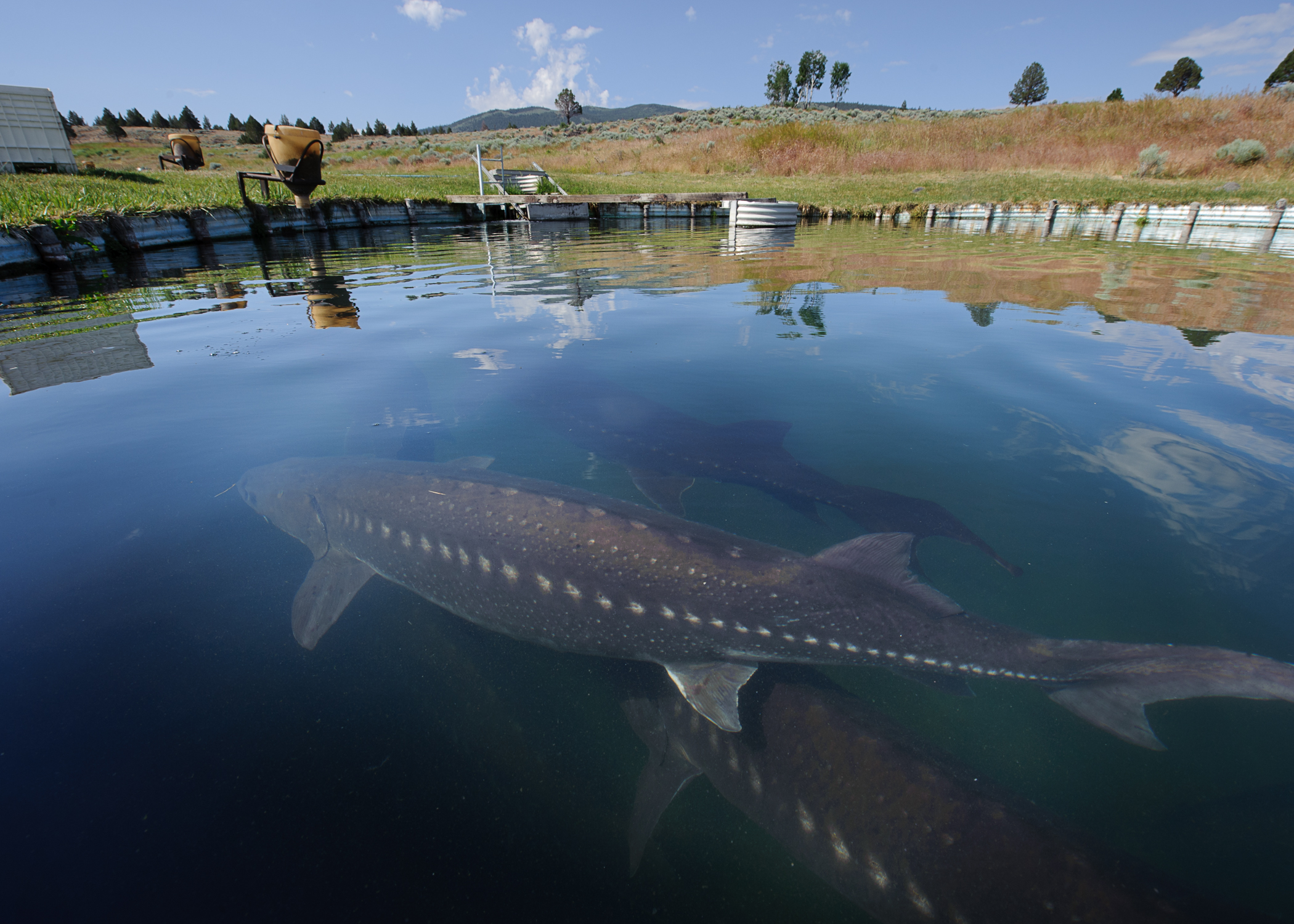
A white sturgeon farm in California

White sturgeon are a resource to a variety of different social and economic groups around the world. Aquaculture facilities cultivate white sturgeon in California and juveniles can be sold to aquarists. They were once the main food source for Native Americans in the 1800s, until overfishing by commercial fleets for caviar drove them to near extinction by the early 1900s. Besides their meat, other important economic products associated with caught sturgeon are caviar, isinglass, and oil. While selling a wild white sturgeon and eggs is illegal in California, it is legal to buy legal caviar from California White sturgeon farms. Poaching is an ongoing issue, in which caviar can sell on the black market for US$100–150 per pound, while a consumer buying legally made caviar from California sturgeon farms pays anywhere from US$40 to $700 for an ounce.

White sturgeon also play a role in sport fishing in the Pacific Northwest, while closed to retention in the Columbia River Basin, catch and release fishing is allowed, with enough popularity for guiding services to offer fishing trips targeted specifically at white sturgeon.

== Conservation status ==
Trends in white sturgeon abundance has been monitored in California for decades, with data showing large variations in recruitment, including five or more consecutive years of low or no recruitment, with probable cause being due to low flows during winter and/or spring months. Although some present white sturgeon populations have been reduced over the past 30 years, some population trends in California are promising, resulting in new angling regulations, monitoring, research efforts, fish passage and habitat restoration.

Despite being a relatively robust population that includes tens of thousands of sub-adults and adults, management is complicated due to exposure of pollutants, freshwater and estuary alteration, harvest, and because of its long life span, which can mask detection of reproductive success. NatureServe ranks white sturgeon globally secure, but imperiled in California due to anthropogenic impacts on their habitats. The American Fisheries Society considers them to be Endangered. The Convention on International Trade in Endangered Species (CITES) of Wild Fauna and Flora has white sturgeon listed as Appendix II, which includes species not necessarily threatened with extinction, but in which trade must be controlled to avoid utilization incompatible with their survival.
