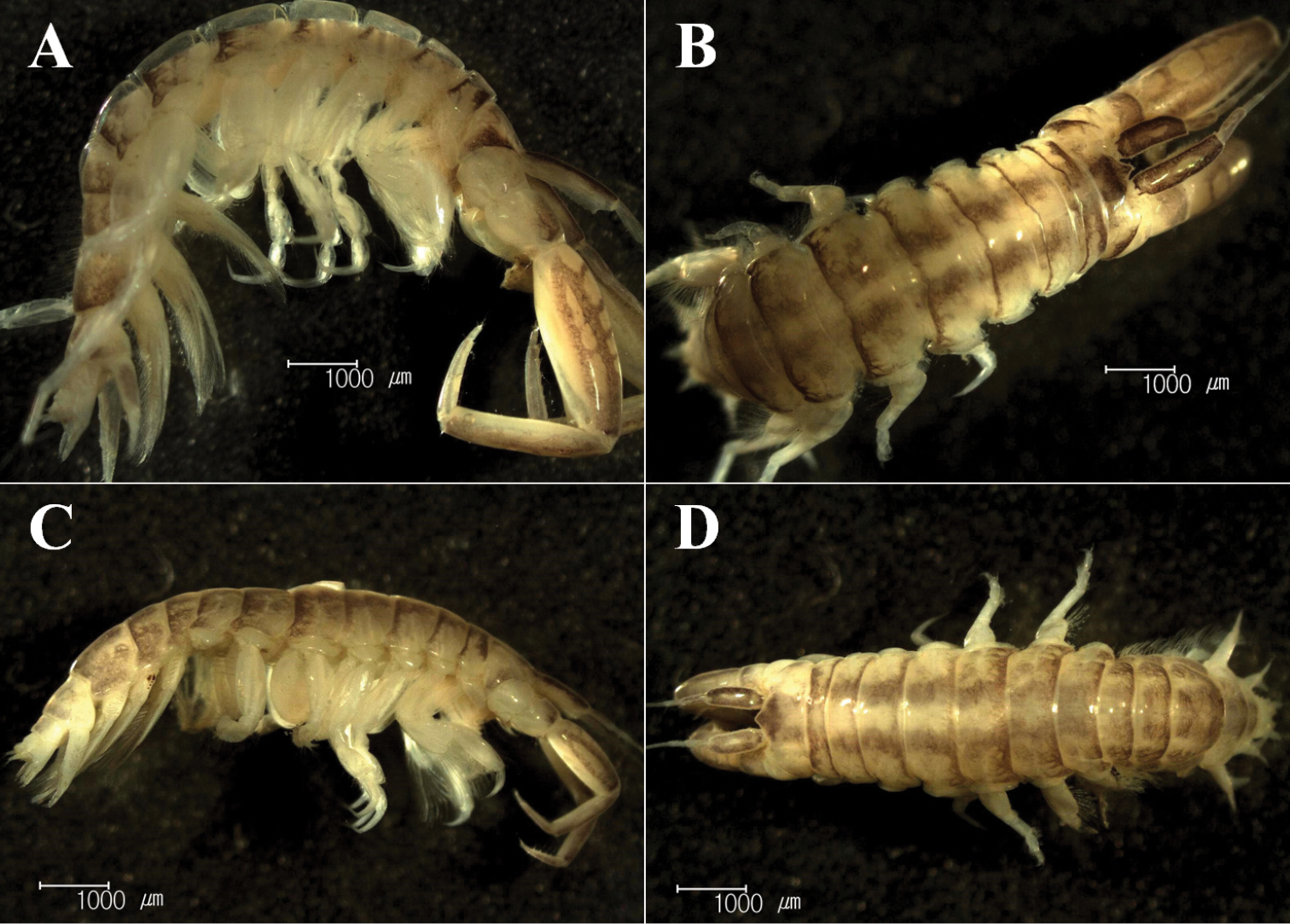
- Male (A, B) and female (C, D)

Scientific classification
- Domain: Eukaryota
- Kingdom: Animalia
- Phylum: Arthropoda
- Class: Malacostraca
- Order: Amphipoda
- Family: Corophiidae
- Genus: Sinocorophium
- Species: S. hangangense

Binomial name
- Sinocorophium hangangense Kim, 2012

= Sinocorophium hangangense =

Species of crustacean

Sinocorophium hangangense is a species of amphipod crustacean found mainly in Korea. The species was found in the lower reaches of Han River in Gyeonggi-do, Korea. The shape of the first and the third uropods, the posterior appendages, alongside the relatively large size of the body distinguishes the Sinocorophium hangangense from other related species.

== Classification ==
Sinocorophium hangangense is classified in the genus Sinocorophium, a genus of 10 species native to the marine and brackish waters of China, Japan, Vietnam and Korea. Sinocorophium is further divided into two groups, one being the relative ancestral and the other is a derived subgroup. The two groups are differentiated by the characteristics of the species' second antenna; first gnathopod, an appendage modified for feeding; uropods and pereopods. Sinocorophium hangangense is a part of the latter group among other species namely, Sinocorophium homoceratum, Sinocorophium intermedium, Sinocorophium japonicum, Sinocorophium monospinum, Sinocorophium triangulopedarum and Sinocorophium alienense.

== Etymology and habitat ==
Named after the locality where Sinocorophium hangangense were first discovered, they are usually found in the blackish water regions and downstream in rivers where salinity is lower. They are mostly found in the Gongreung stream, a small Han River tributary in the lower reaches of the river. The naming, "han-gang-ense" came after the "Han river" as the Korean word "gang" means river. In Korea they are also known as Han-gang-baem-yeop-sae-u. Alongside Han River in Gyeonggi-do, they are also found in parts of Paju-si, Gyoha-eup and Songchon-ri, Korea.

== Description ==
Being a part of the genus Sinocorophium, S. hangangense has a cylindrical body with second antenna resembling the shape of the crustacean's foot with ventrodistal tooth. First gnathopod's palm of propodus is transversed and distinct as it is dactylus rather short. Pereopods no. 3-4's carpus are not shortened, though, it's slightly shorter than merus. Pleonal epimeron no. 3 is subquadrately pointed posteroventrally. They have urosomites separated and laterally inserted uropod no. 1. The telson is short and subtriangular in shape.

=== Coloration ===
When preserved in alcohol, the body of the species is yellowish grey with a light brownish color between antennae and urosomites, the color reticulate pattern dorsally significantly the pereonities with light brown longitudinal rows.

=== Adult male ===
With distally pointed rostrum, triangular in dorsal view, the head of the species is longer than pereonite 1. The overall body is 12.2 mm (0.48 in) long. After preservation in alcohol the eyes are transparent, but the cephalic lobe is observed to be sharply produced. Shorter than pereonite no. 3, pereonite no. 1 and 2 is subequal in length. Urosomite no. 1 and 3 are separate.

Antenna no. 1 is subequal in length to head and is weakly setose. However, antenna no. 2 is massive, twice as long as antenna no. 1.

The telson is thickened, grooved centrally and fleshy. The shape is sub-triangular, broadest in the center and truncate at the corners.

=== Female ===
The body is almost similar to that of the male including antenna no. 2, nevertheless, the rostrum is weaker. Antenna no. 2 is less robust and shorter than male's antenna no. 2.
