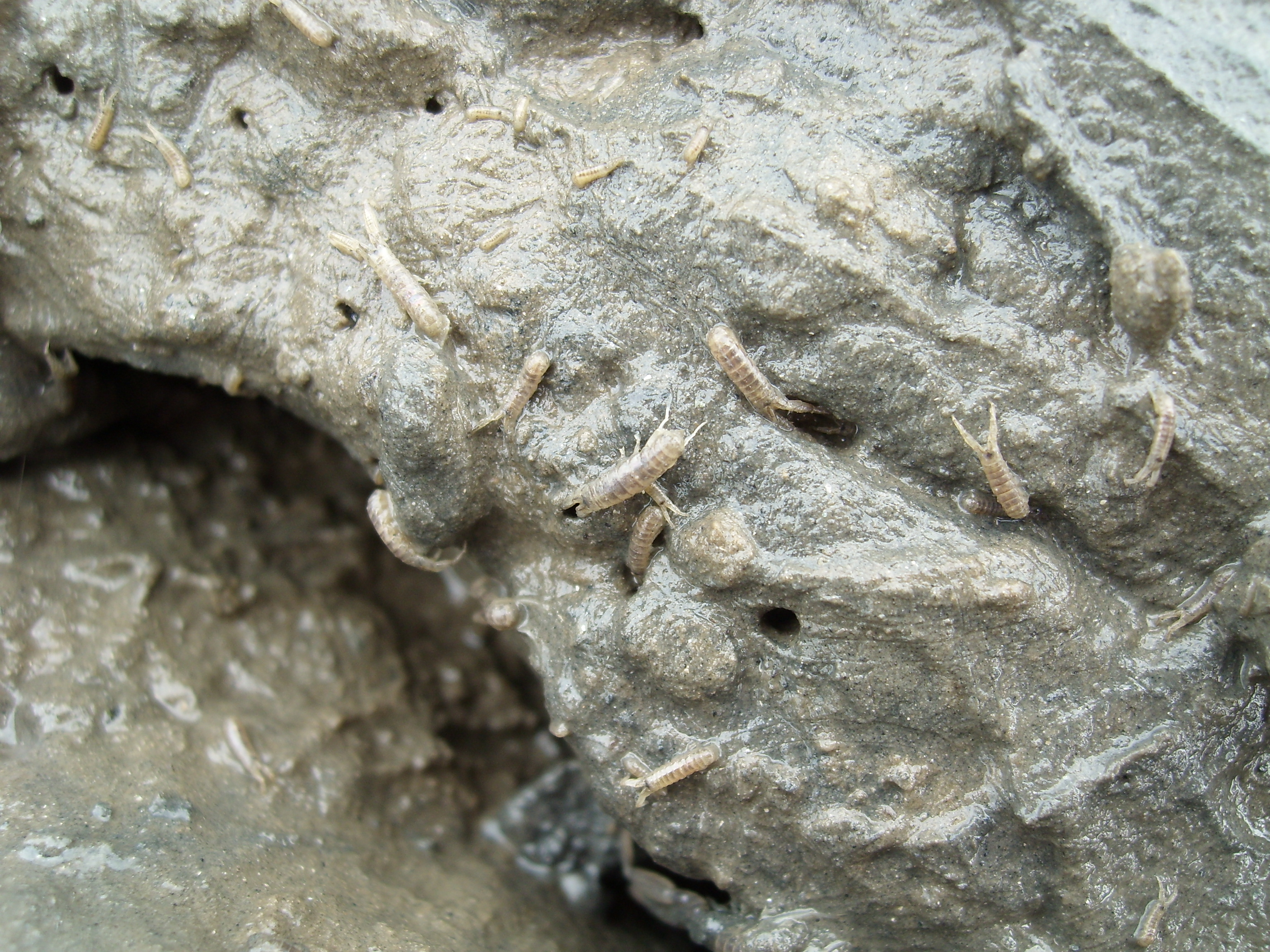
- Corophium volutator

Scientific classification
- Kingdom: Animalia
- Phylum: Arthropoda
- Clade: Pancrustacea
- Class: Malacostraca
- Order: Amphipoda
- Family: Corophiidae
- Subfamily: Corophiinae
- Tribe: Corophiini
- Genus: Corophium; Latreille, 1806

Species
- See text

= Corophium =

Genus of crustaceans

Corophium is a genus of the amphipod family Corophiidae. Formerly a much larger genus, many species have been transferred to segregate genera such as Monocorophium and Crassicorophium.

== Species ==
Corophium contains 12 species, after the genus was divided into a number of new genera in 1997:

- Corophium arenarium Crawford, 1937
- Corophium bicaudatus Linnaeus, 1761
- Corophium colo Lowry, 2004
- Corophium denticulatum Ren, 1995
- Corophium grossipes Linnaeus, 1767
- Corophium laevicorne Sowinsky, 1880
- Corophium linearis Pennant, 1777
- Corophium longicornis J. C. Fabricius, 1779
- Corophium multisetosum Stock, 1952
- Corophium orientale Schellenberg, 1928
- Corophium urdaibaiense Marquiegui & Perez, 2006
- Corophium volutator (Pallas, 1766)

=== Corophium arenarium ===
C. arenarium may reach 7 mm long and looks very similar to C. volutator. It burrows in bottom sediments, between 10 and 60 metres deep. C. arenarium occurs on the coasts of France and the North Sea.

=== Corophium multisetosum ===
C. multisetosum may grow to 9 mm and builds mud burrows in clay or sand in fresh or weakly brackish habitats. It occurs on the coasts of the Netherlands, France, Germany, Poland and the British Isles.

=== Corophium volutator ===
C. volutator inhabits the upper layers of sand on the coasts of the Netherlands, Germany, the United Kingdom and France, as well as in the Bay of Fundy, New Brunswick, Canada. They grow to 10 mm, and can occur in huge quantities: up to 40,000 per square metre have been observed.
