= Brachyurin =

Identifiers
- EC no.: 3.4.21.32
- CAS no.: 848900-32-3

Databases
- IntEnz: IntEnz view
- BRENDA: BRENDA entry
- ExPASy: NiceZyme view
- KEGG: KEGG entry
- MetaCyc: metabolic pathway
- PRIAM: profile
- PDB structures: RCSB PDB PDBe PDBsum
Search
- PMC: articles
- PubMed: articles
- NCBI: proteins

Brachyurin (EC 3.4.21.32, Uca pugilator collagenolytic proteinase, crab protease I, crab protease II) is an enzyme. This enzyme catalyses the Hydrolysis of proteins, with broad specificity for peptide bonds. Native collagen is cleaved about 75% of the length of the molecule from the N-terminus.

This enzyme is isolated from hepatopancreas of the fiddler crab, Uca pugilator.
