= Paracorophium excavatum =

Scientific classification
- Kingdom: Animalia
- Phylum: Arthropoda
- Clade: Pancrustacea
- Class: Malacostraca
- Order: Amphipoda
- Family: Corophiidae
- Genus: Paracorophium
- Species: P. excavatum

Binomial name
- Paracorophium excavatum (G. M. Thomson, 1884)

Species of crustacean

Paracorophium excavatum is a species of amphipod in the family Corophiidae. It has been confused with other species, such that the only reliable record is from its type locality at Brighton, Otago.
