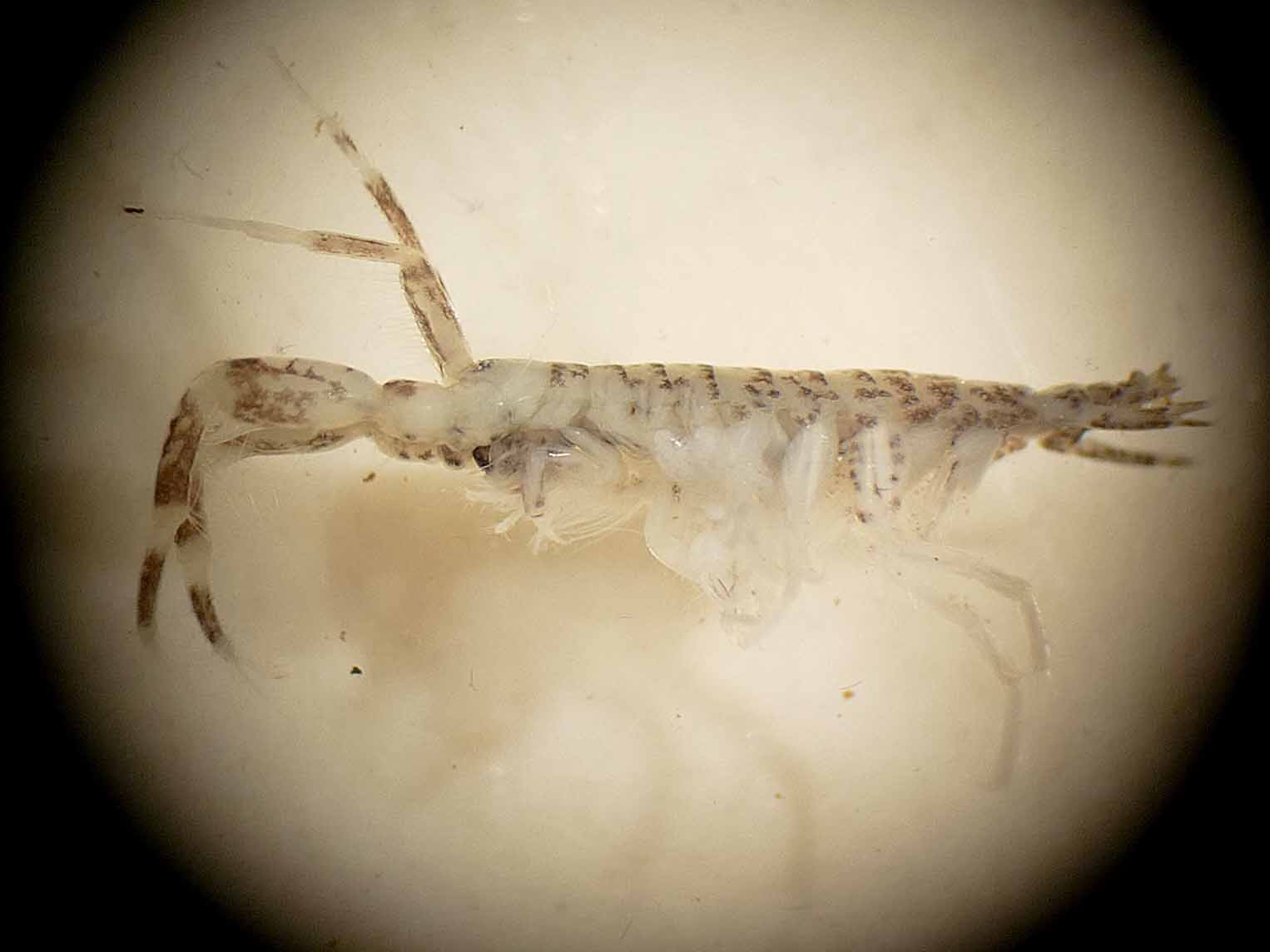

Scientific classification
- Domain: Eukaryota
- Kingdom: Animalia
- Phylum: Arthropoda
- Class: Malacostraca
- Order: Amphipoda
- Family: Corophiidae
- Genus: Chelicorophium
- Species: C. curvispinum

Binomial name
- Chelicorophium curvispinum (G. O. Sars, 1895)

= Chelicorophium curvispinum =

Species of crustacean

Chelicorophium curvispinum is a species of amphipod crustacean. It lives in salt, brackish and fresh water, and may reach 6 millimetres (0.24 in) in length. It occurs in the Caspian Sea, the Black Sea and adjoining rivers, and in river systems emptying into the southern Baltic and North Sea.
