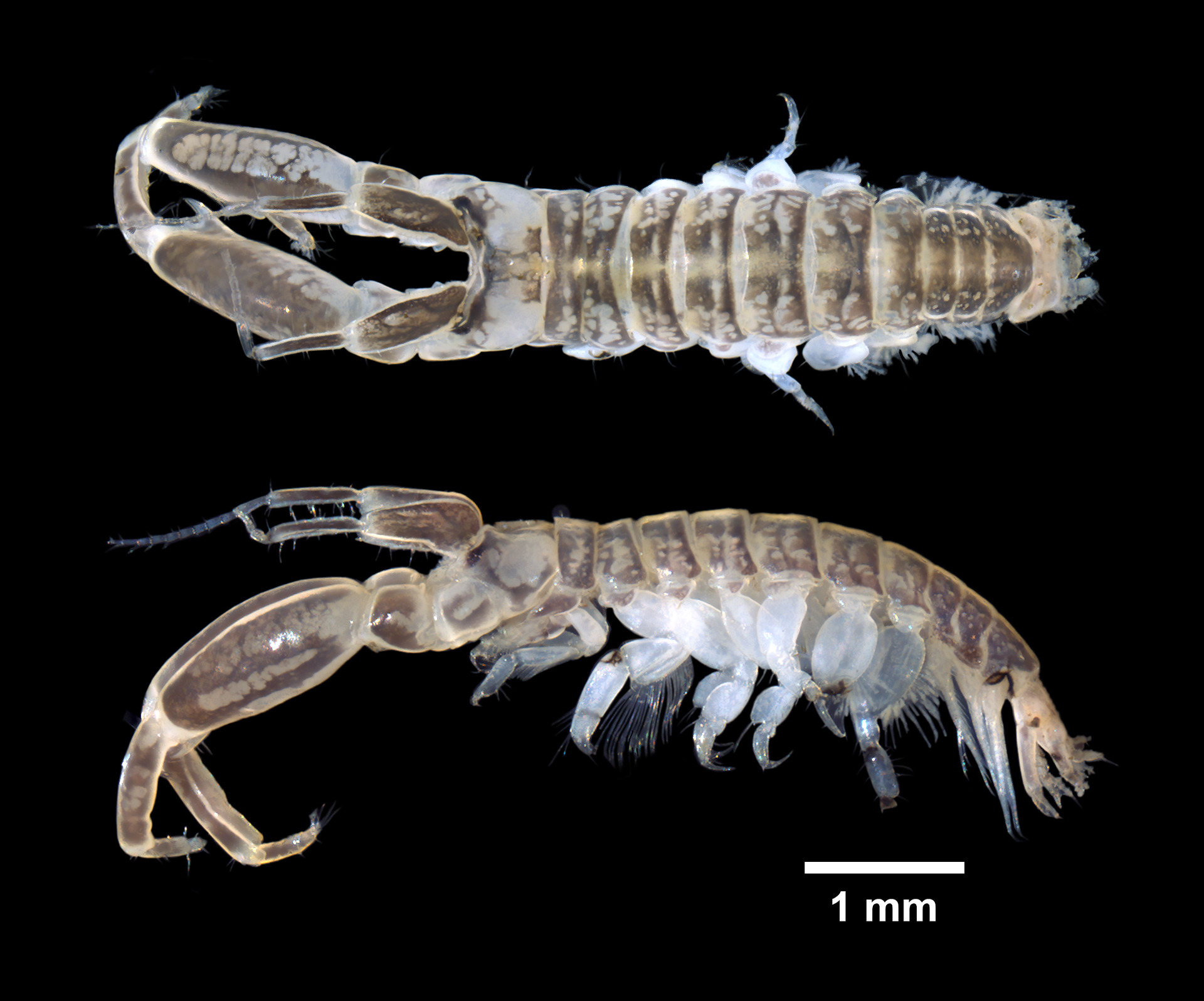
- Monocorophium acherusicum

Scientific classification
- Domain: Eukaryota
- Kingdom: Animalia
- Phylum: Arthropoda
- Class: Malacostraca
- Order: Amphipoda
- Family: Corophiidae
- Genus: Monocorophium
- Species: M. acherusicum

Binomial name
- Monocorophium acherusicum (A. Costa, 1853)

Synonyms
- Corophium acherusicum A. Costa, 1853

= Monocorophium acherusicum =

Species of crustacean

Monocorophium acherusicum is a species of amphipod crustacean.

== Description ==
Monocorophium acherusicum is a small (5 mm) species. It is brown with a very short abdomen, and has three little spines on its enlarged second antennae. It has rows of hair on its anterior legs, which it uses to filter food from the water.

== Distribution and habitat ==
Monocorophium acherusicum is native to Europe, but was introduced to harbours of Australia by travelling in the ballast water of ships.
