= Crassicorophium crassicorne =

Scientific classification
- Domain: Eukaryota
- Kingdom: Animalia
- Phylum: Arthropoda
- Class: Malacostraca
- Order: Amphipoda
- Family: Corophiidae
- Genus: Crassicorophium
- Species: C. crassicorne

Binomial name
- Crassicorophium crassicorne (Bruzelius, 1859)

Species of crustacean

Crassicorophium crassicorne is a species of amphipod crustacean. It lives in shallow subtidal muddy sand and may grow up to 5 millimetres (0.20 in) long. C. crassicorne occurs on American and European coasts from Norway to the Black Sea.
