= Sinocorophium heteroceratum =

Scientific classification
- Domain: Eukaryota
- Kingdom: Animalia
- Phylum: Arthropoda
- Class: Malacostraca
- Order: Amphipoda
- Family: Corophiidae
- Genus: Sinocorophium
- Species: S. heteroceratum

Binomial name
- Sinocorophium heteroceratum (Yu, 1938)

Species of crustacean

Sinocorophium heteroceratum is a species of amphipod crustacean. It naturally occurs in Southeast Asia, but was introduced to San Francisco Bay, probably carried in the ballast water of cargo ships.
