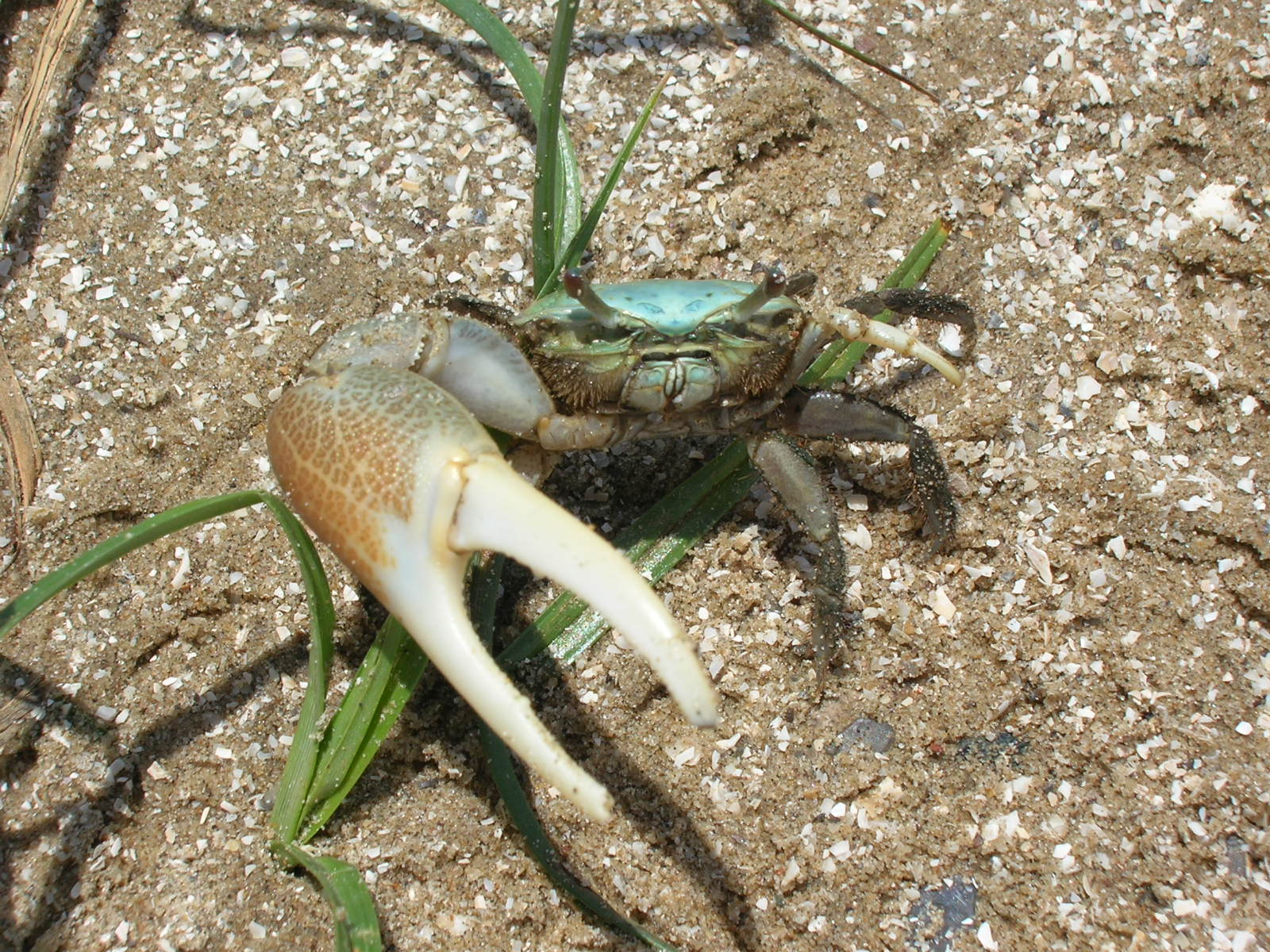

Scientific classification
- Kingdom: Animalia
- Phylum: Arthropoda
- Class: Malacostraca
- Order: Decapoda
- Suborder: Pleocyemata
- Infraorder: Brachyura
- Family: Ocypodidae
- Subfamily: Gelasiminae
- Tribe: Minucini
- Genus: Minuca
- Species: M. longisignalis

Binomial name
- Minuca longisignalis (Salmon & Atsaides, 1968)

= Minuca longisignalis =

Species of crab

Minuca longisignalis, the longwave gulf fiddler, is a species of American broad-front fiddler crab in the family Ocypodidae.

Minuca longisignalis was formerly in the genus Uca, but in 2016 it was placed in the genus Minuca, a former subgenus of Uca.

== Predation ==
This crab is prey to frogs, toads, gulls, herons, mangrove rails, willets, Atlantic blue crabs, mud crabs, Gulf killifishes, red drums, spotted bass, jellyfish, raccoons, marsh rice rats, diamondback terrapins, snakes, and skinks.
