= Medicorophium affine =

Scientific classification
- Domain: Eukaryota
- Kingdom: Animalia
- Phylum: Arthropoda
- Class: Malacostraca
- Order: Amphipoda
- Family: Corophiidae
- Genus: Medicorophium
- Species: M. affine

Binomial name
- Medicorophium affine (Bruzelius, 1859)

Species of crustacean

Medicorophium affine is a species of amphipod crustacean. It is a small (up to 5 mm) species which burrows in bottom sediments, between 10 and 80 metres deep. It occurs on coasts of Northern Europe.
