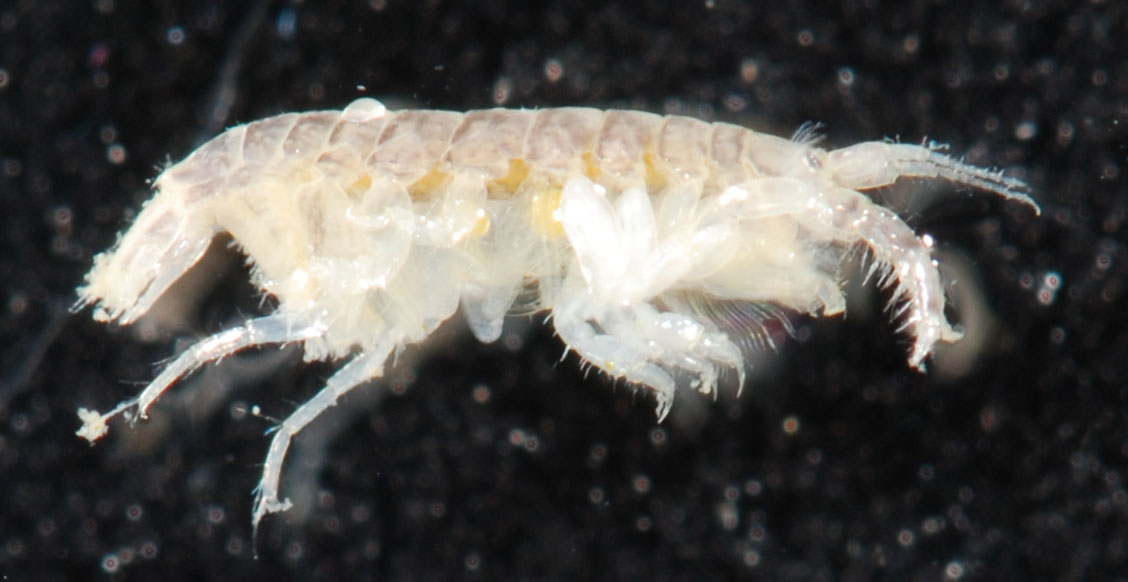

Scientific classification
- Domain: Eukaryota
- Kingdom: Animalia
- Phylum: Arthropoda
- Class: Malacostraca
- Order: Amphipoda
- Family: Corophiidae
- Genus: Apocorophium
- Species: A. lacustre

Binomial name
- Apocorophium lacustre (Vanhöffen, 1911)

= Apocorophium lacustre =

Species of crustacean

Apocorophium lacustre is a species of amphipod crustacean. It lives in nearly fresh water; it is white and up to 6 mm long. It occurs mainly on the Atlantic coast of North America, the North Sea and the Baltic.
