= Medicorophium =

Scientific classification
- Domain: Eukaryota
- Kingdom: Animalia
- Phylum: Arthropoda
- Class: Malacostraca
- Order: Amphipoda
- Family: Corophiidae
- Subfamily: Corophiinae
- Tribe: Corophiini
- Genus: Medicorophium; Bousfield & Hoover, 1997

Genus of crustaceans

Medicorophium is a genus of amphipod crustaceans, comprising the following species:

- Medicorophium aculeatum (Chevreux, 1908)
- Medicorophium affine (Bruzelius, 1859)
- Medicorophium annulatum (Chevreux, 1908)
- Medicorophium longisetosum Myers, De-La-Ossa-Carretero & Dauvin, 2010
- Medicorophium minimum (Schiecke, 1978)
- Medicorophium rotundirostre (Stephensen, 1915)
- Medicorophium runcicorne (Della Valle, 1893)
