= Chaetocorophium =

Scientific classification
- Kingdom: Animalia
- Phylum: Arthropoda
- Clade: Pancrustacea
- Class: Malacostraca
- Order: Amphipoda
- Family: Corophiidae
- Genus: Chaetocorophium; Karaman, 1979
- Species: C. lucasi

Binomial name
- Chaetocorophium lucasi (Hurley, 1954)

Synonyms
- Paracorophium lucasi Hurley, 1954

Genus of crustaceans

Chaetocorophium is a monotypic genus of amphipods in the family Corophiidae, containing only the species Chaetocorophium lucasi. Chaetocorophium is very closely related to Paracorophium, and some researchers propose synonymising the two genera.

C. lucasi is endemic to New Zealand, where it is found only in a few sites in the North Island (Lake Rotorua, Lake Waikare, Lake Rotoiti, at Whakatāne, Raglan, Waitara, and Whanganui) and in lakes and intertidal mudflats across South Island. It is epigean, and was listed as "Sparse" in the 2002 New Zealand Threat Classification System list for freshwater invertebrates.
