= Protomedeia (crustacean) =

Scientific classification
- Domain: Eukaryota
- Kingdom: Animalia
- Phylum: Arthropoda
- Class: Malacostraca
- Order: Amphipoda
- Family: Corophiidae
- Genus: Protomedeia; Krøyer, 1842

Genus of Crustacean

Protomedeia is a genus of crustaceans first described by Henrik Nikolai Krøyer in 1842.

== Species ==
Thirteen species are recognized:

- Protomedeia articulata
- Protomedeia chelata
- Protomedeia dulkeiti
- Protomedeia epimerata
- Protomedeia fasciata
- Protomedeia fasciatoides
- Protomedeia grandimana
- Protomedeia gurjanovae
- Protomedeia penates
- Protomedeia popovi
- Protomedeia prudens
- Protomedeia stephenseni
- Protomedeia zotea
