= Chelicorophium =

Scientific classification
- Domain: Eukaryota
- Kingdom: Animalia
- Phylum: Arthropoda
- Class: Malacostraca
- Order: Amphipoda
- Family: Corophiidae
- Subfamily: Corophiinae
- Tribe: Corophiini
- Genus: Chelicorophium; Bousfield & Hoover, 1997

Genus of crustaceans

Chelicorophium is a genus of amphipod crustaceans, comprising the following species:

- Chelicorophium chelicorne (G. O. Sars, 1895)
- Chelicorophium curvispinum (G. O. Sars, 1895)
- Chelicorophium madrasensis (Nayar, 1950)
- Chelicorophium maeoticum (Sowinsky, 1898)
- Chelicorophium monodon (G. O. Sars, 1895)
- Chelicorophium muconatum (G. O. Sars, 1895)
- Chelicorophium nobile (G. O. Sars, 1895)
- Chelicorophium robustum (G. O. Sars, 1895)
- Chelicorophium sowinsky (Martynov, 1924)
- Chelicorophium spinulosum (G. O. Sars, 1895)
- Chelicorophium spongicolum (Welitchkovsky, 1914)
- Chelicorophium villosus (Carausu, 1943)
