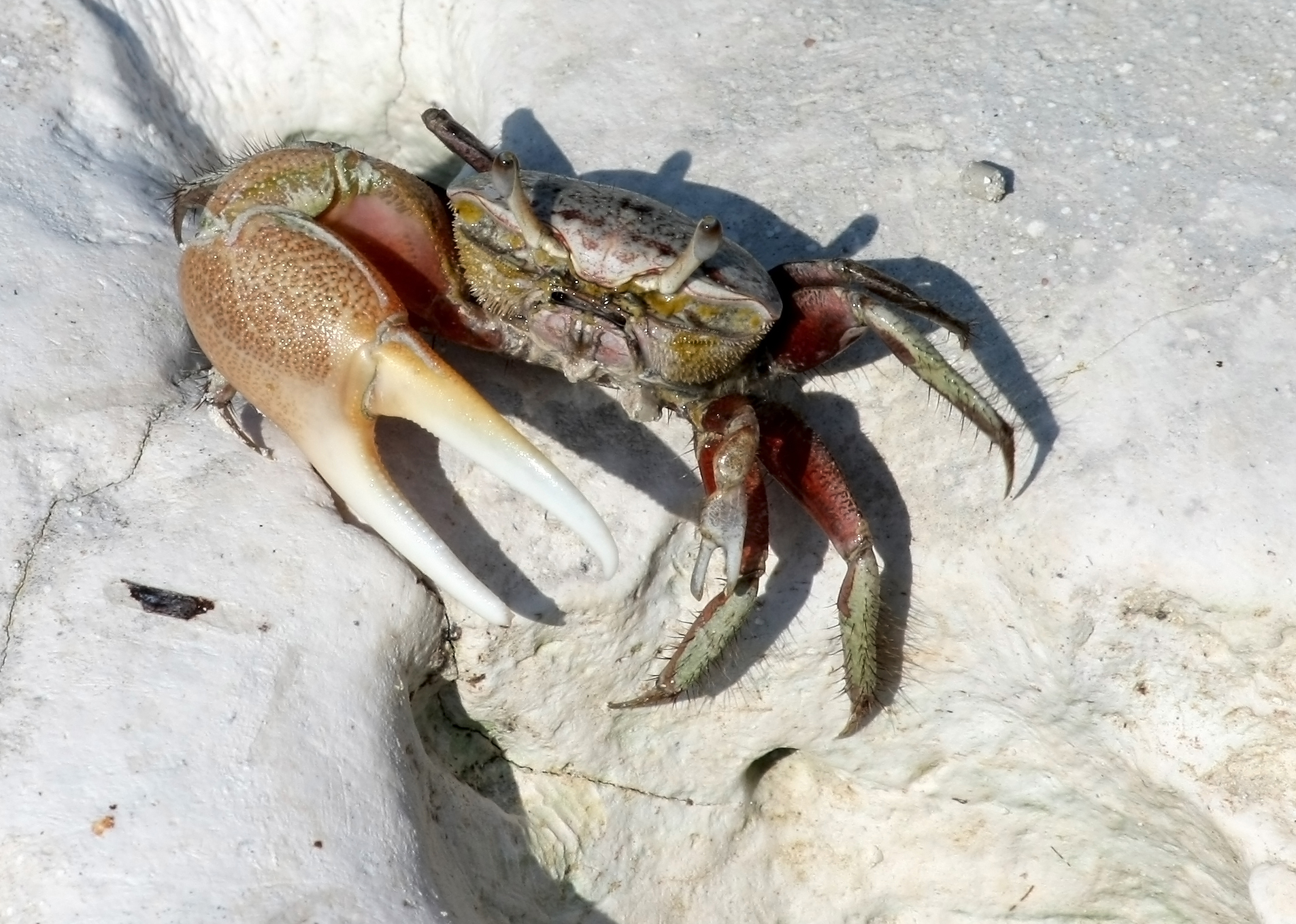
- Male
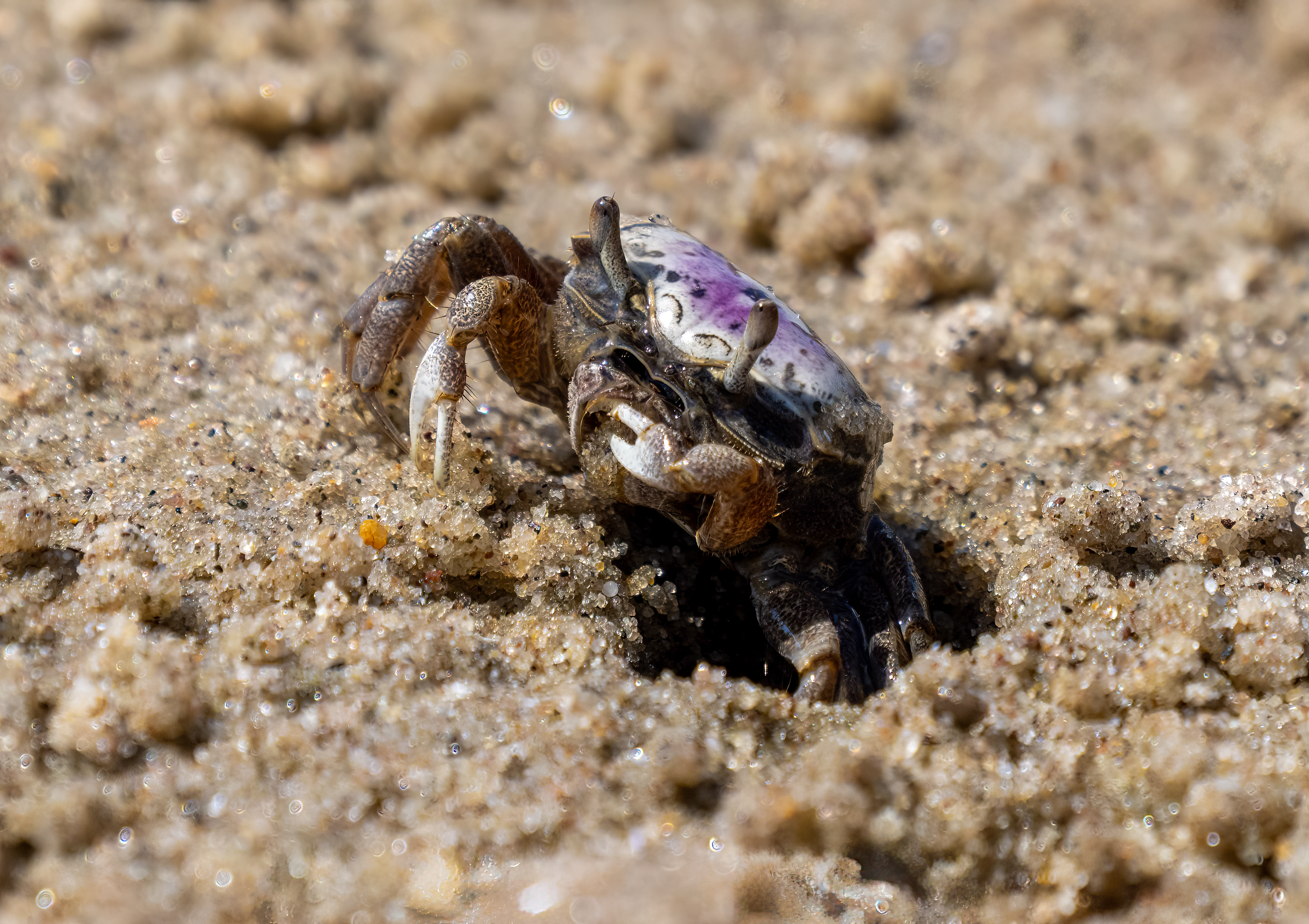
- Female

Scientific classification
- Kingdom: Animalia
- Phylum: Arthropoda
- Clade: Pancrustacea
- Class: Malacostraca
- Order: Decapoda
- Suborder: Pleocyemata
- Infraorder: Brachyura
- Family: Ocypodidae
- Subfamily: Gelasiminae
- Tribe: Minucini
- Genus: Leptuca
- Species: L. pugilator

Binomial name
- Leptuca pugilator (Bosc, 1802)

= Leptuca pugilator =

Species of crab

Leptuca pugilator, the sand fiddler crab, Atlantic sand fiddler crab, or Calico fiddler, is a species of fiddler crab that is found from Massachusetts to the Gulf of Mexico. It lives in burrows in coastal and estuarine mud-flats, and can be extremely abundant. It can be differentiated from the morphologically similar Minuca pugnax and Minuca minax by the smoothness of the inside of its claws. One claw is larger than the other, and can be much larger than the crab's body, at up to 41 mm (1.6 in) long.

Leptuca pugilator was formerly in the genus Uca, but in 2016 it became a member of the genus Leptuca, a former subgenus of Uca.

== Description ==
The carapace is square in shape, tapering slightly to the rear; it can reach a width of 25 millimetres (0.98 in), but is typically up to 21 mm (0.83 in) wide and 14 mm (0.55 in) long. The space between the eyes is much shorter than the eyestalk. The males have one extremely enlarged chela (claw), which they use to claim their territory and fight with other males. The claw can be much larger than the body, at up to 35 mm (1.4 in) long, or exceptionally up to 41 mm (1.6 in) long. It is common for males to lose claws in the battles. When this happens, the claw regenerates and the opposite side begins to enlarge. Fiddler crabs are right or left clawed. The inside of these claws are also very smooth, unlike its other close relatives Minuca pugnax and Minuca minax.

== Geographic distribution ==
Leptuca pugilator is one of only five species of fiddler crabs found primarily in temperate areas. The species occurs on the east coast of North America and in the Gulf of Mexico, having been found as far north as Massachusetts and as far south as Texas and Florida. This species has also reportedly been found in the Bahamas. They may also be found in the warmer waters of the Atlantic along the West coast of Africa.

== Habitat ==
Leptuca pugilator can be found in estuarine and coastal areas or sheltered shores with sandy or muddy substrates. It is frequently found in areas bordering marshes and along the banks of tidal streams. It can be found in these areas in large numbers – thousands to millions.
