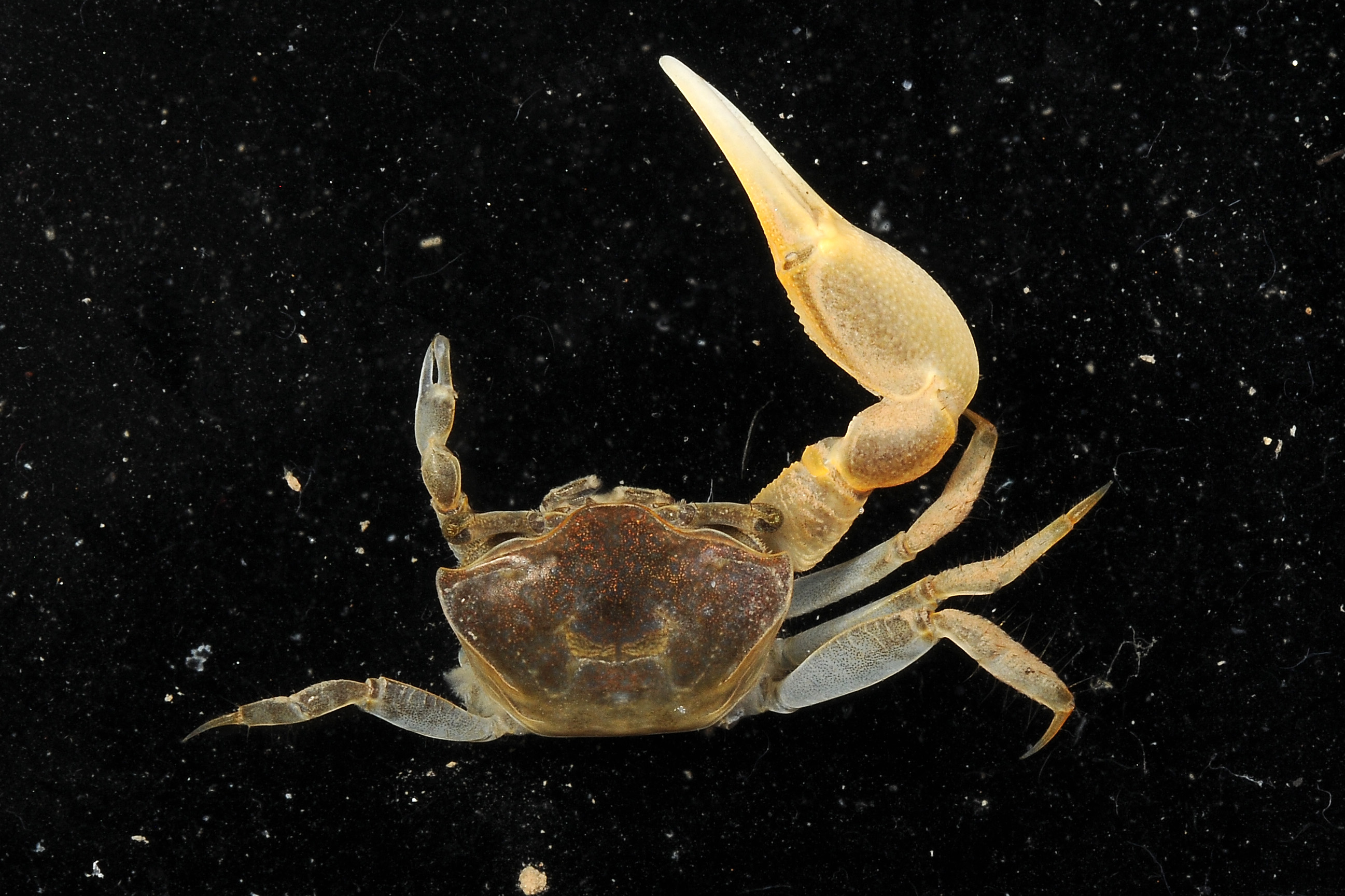
- ''Minuca mordax''

Scientific classification
- Kingdom: Animalia
- Phylum: Arthropoda
- Clade: Pancrustacea
- Class: Malacostraca
- Order: Decapoda
- Suborder: Pleocyemata
- Infraorder: Brachyura
- Family: Ocypodidae
- Subfamily: Gelasiminae
- Tribe: Minucini
- Genus: Minuca; Bott, 1954

= Minuca (crab) =

Genus of crabs

Minuca is a genus of crabs belonging to the family Ocypodidae.

The species of this genus are found in America.

== Species ==
Species:

- Minuca argillicola (Crane, 1941)
- Minuca brevifrons (Stimpson, 1860)
- Minuca burgersi (Holthuis, 1967)
- Minuca minax (Le Conte, 1855)
- Minuca ecuadoriensis (Maccagno, 1928)
- Minuca galapagensis (Rathbun, 1902)
- Minuca herradurensis (Bott, 1954)
- Minuca longisignalis (Salmon & Atsaides, 1968)
- Minuca marguerita (Thurman, 1981)
- Minuca mordax (Smith, 1870)
- Minuca osa (Landstorfer & Schubart, 2010)
- Minuca pugnax (Smith, 1870)
- Minuca rapax (Smith, 1870)
- Minuca umbratila (Crane, 1941)
- Minuca victoriana (von Hagen, 1987)
- Minuca virens (Salmon & Atsaides, 1968)
- Minuca vocator (Herbst, 1804)
- Minuca zacae (Crane, 1941)
