= Apocorophium =

Scientific classification
- Domain: Eukaryota
- Kingdom: Animalia
- Phylum: Arthropoda
- Class: Malacostraca
- Order: Amphipoda
- Family: Corophiidae
- Subfamily: Corophiinae
- Tribe: Corophiini
- Genus: Apocorophium; Bousfield & Hoover, 1997

Genus of crustaceans

Apocorophium is a genus of amphipod crustaceans, comprising the following species:

- Apocorophium acutum (Chevreux, 1908)
- Apocorophium curumim Valério-Berardo & Thiago de Souza, 2009
- Apocorophium lacustre (Vanhöffen, 1911)
- Apocorophium louisianum (Shoemaker, 1934)
- Apocorophium simile (Shoemaker, 1943)
