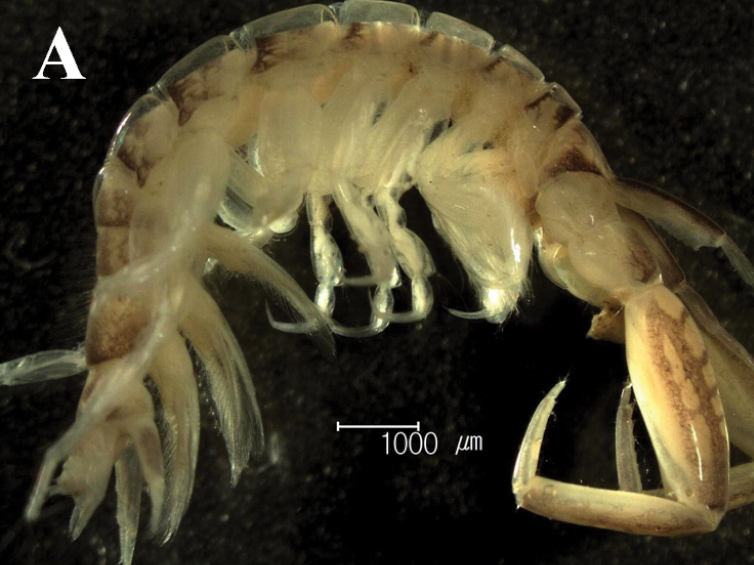
- Sinocorophium hangangense

Scientific classification
- Kingdom: Animalia
- Phylum: Arthropoda
- Clade: Pancrustacea
- Class: Malacostraca
- Order: Amphipoda
- Family: Corophiidae
- Subfamily: Corophiinae
- Tribe: Corophiini
- Genus: Sinocorophium; Bousfield & Hoover, 1997

= Sinocorophium =

Genus of crustaceans

Sinocorophium is a genus of amphipod crustaceans.

== Description ==
Sinocorophium individuals are generally found in the intertidal zone, burrowing in mud in marine to brackish waters. As of 2012, Sinocorophium consists about 13 species with most of them being reported to live in the Far East including China, Japan, Korea and Vietnam, in endemic to temperate and sub-tropical shallows. Sinocorophium alienese is the only exception, as according to reports, the species occurs in the delta of San Francisco Bay and areas of the northeast Pacific Ocean. Sinocorophium alienese came to the northeast Pacific region through widespread ballast water traffic during Vietnam War.

Morphologically, the genus Sinocorophium, is characterized by having a rounded posterior and ventral corner of the third epimeron, a body part which connects basal joint to each appendage. The characterization include, the separated urosomites, an abdominal segment in Crustaceans and laterally inserted first posterior appendage .

== Species ==
Sinocorophium contains 13 species:

- Sinocorophium alienense (Chapman, 1988)
- Sinocorophium dongtanense Ren & Liu, 2014
- Sinocorophium hangangense Kim, 2012
- Sinocorophium heteroceratum Yu, 1938)
- Sinocorophium homoceratum (Yu, 1938)
- Sinocorophium intermedium (Ngoc, 1965)
- Sinocorophium japonicum (Hirayama, 1984)
- Sinocorophium jindoense Heo & Kim, 2017
- Sinocorophium lamellatum (Hirayama, 1984)
- Sinocorophium minutum (Ngoc, 1965)
- Sinocorophium monospinum (Shen, 1955)
- Sinocorophium sinensis (Zhang, 1974)
- Sinocorophium triangulopedarum (Hirayama, 1986)
