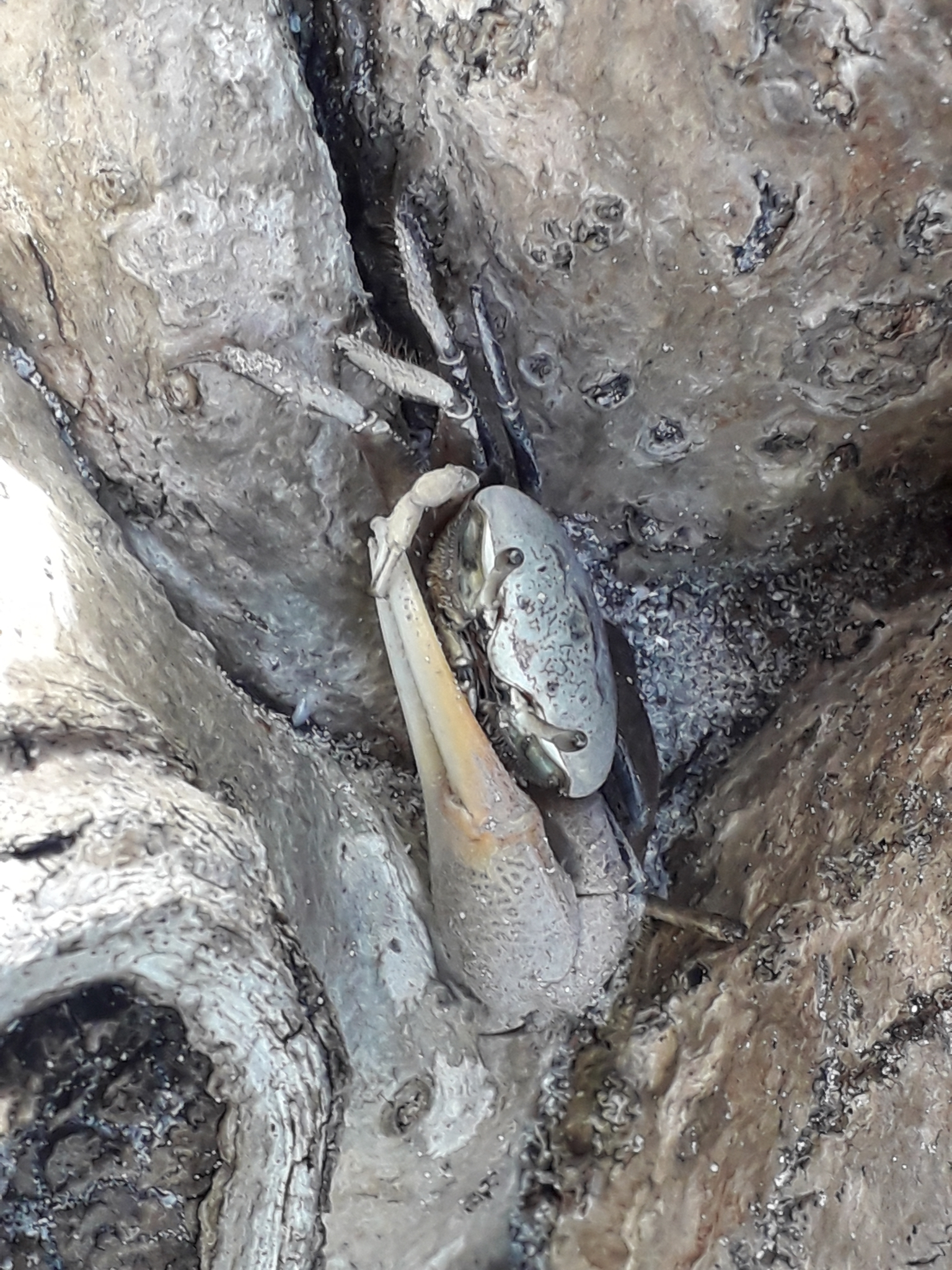

Scientific classification
- Kingdom: Animalia
- Phylum: Arthropoda
- Clade: Pancrustacea
- Class: Malacostraca
- Order: Decapoda
- Suborder: Pleocyemata
- Infraorder: Brachyura
- Family: Ocypodidae
- Subfamily: Gelasiminae
- Genus: Minuca
- Species: M. rapax

Binomial name
- Minuca rapax (Smith, 1870)

Synonyms
- Uca rapax

= Minuca rapax =

Species of crab

Minuca rapax, also known by its common name mudflat fiddler crab, is a species of crab in the family Ocypodidae.
