= Paracorophium =

Scientific classification
- Kingdom: Animalia
- Phylum: Arthropoda
- Clade: Pancrustacea
- Class: Malacostraca
- Order: Amphipoda
- Family: Corophiidae
- Subfamily: Corophiinae
- Tribe: Paracorophiini
- Genus: Paracorophium; Stebbing, 1899

Species
- See text

Genus of crustaceans

Paracorophium is a genus of amphipods in the family Corophiidae.

== Species ==
- Paracorophium brisbanensis Chapman, 2002
- Paracorophium excavatum (Thomson, 1884)
- Paracorophium lucasi Hurley, 1954
