= Serge Doroshov =

Animal Science Professor

Serge I. Doroshov
- Born: 1937; Soviet Union
- Died: November 26, 2020 (aged 82–83)

Academic background
- Education: University of Moscow (BS, MS), Shirshov Institute of Oceanology, Russian Academy of Science (PhD)

Academic work
- Discipline: animal science, aquaculture
- Institutions: UC Davis (1978–2014)

Serge I. Doroshov (1937–2020) was an animal science professor known as the "father of sturgeon aquaculture." He was born and educated in the Soviet Union, but defected and was granted political asylum in the United States. From 1978 to 2014, he was an animal science professor at UC Davis focusing his research and teaching on aquaculture. His work was integral to the commercial success of sturgeon caviar production in Sacramento County, California.

== Early life ==
Doroshov was born in Western Siberia in 1937. In 1943, after both his parents died, he moved to Moscow to live with his older sister. He earned B.S. and M.S. degrees in zoology from the University of Moscow (1959) and a Ph.D. in biology from the Russian Academy of Science (1967).

In 1968, Doroshov began his career at what is now the Russian Research Institute of Marine Fisheries and Oceanography, becoming director of the Laboratory of Marine Aquaculture. His work there included research with sturgeon, black sea urchin, White Sea cod, polar flounder, and striped bass.

In 1975, Doroshov was hired by the United Nations Food and Agriculture Organization (FAO) and served as an expert consultant for aquaculture projects around the world. After finishing a project in Cuba, Doroshov with his family decided not to return to the Soviet Union. Instead they flew to Rome where FAO was headquartered, fled to the U.S. Embassy, and were granted political asylum in the United States.

== Work on sturgeon aquaculture ==
Despite regulations limiting commercial fishing and conservation efforts, global overfishing and poaching of sturgeon since the nineteenth century decimated and continues to threaten wild sturgeon populations. In the twentieth century, other commercial fishing increasingly relied on aquaculture to satisfy market demand, but commercial sturgeon aquaculture had not developed before the 1980s due to challenges breeding sturgeon in hatcheries. Wild female sturgeon generally do not spawn until they are 15–20 years old and have complicated reproduction cycles that are difficult to synthesize in hatcheries. By the 1970s, scientists in the Soviet Union had begun making advancements in sturgeon hatchery reproduction.

Doroshov arrived at UC Davis with knowledge and experience from the advanced Soviet aquacultural program. Quickly upon arriving at UC Davis in 1978, Doroshov began research with the white sturgeon native to California. In 1979, Doroshov received funding from the United States Fish and Wildlife Service and the National Marine Fisheries Service to research reproductive physiology and broodstock development of white sturgeon. In 1980, Doroshov's team successfully spawned the first wild white sturgeon broodstock in a research hatchery at UC Davis. In 1981, Doroshov's team spawned the first wild broodstock by a commercial farm in California.

In the 1980s, Doroshov helped apply his science to support and develop private hatcheries in Sacramento County. In 1988, Doroshov led the publication of the Hatchery Manual for White Sturgeon, a detailed guide of best practices for industry farmers and other researchers. Sacramento County's largest sturgeon and caviar producers benefitted from frequent collaborations with Doroshov and his team.

In the 1980s, Doroshov "viewed the project purely as an intellectual pursuit" and as of 2001 he still didn't think the local industry would be hugely profitable.

By 2022, Sacramento County sturgeon caviar producers accounted more than $30 million revenue and sourced about 80% of the United States’ domestic caviar, supplying many of the country's finest restaurants. Sacramento is now known as the "caviar capital of the United States."

== Publications and awards ==
Doroshov authored over 150 peer-reviewed scientific papers and books. He also received many awards and honors including the California Aquaculture Association Distinguished Service Award (1998), World Aquaculture Association Honorary Lifetime Membership Award (2000), and the National Aquaculture Association Joseph P. McCraren Award for Lifetime Contributions to the Aquaculture Industry (2018).

Doroshov appeared as himself in a 1995 documentary, "Sturgeon: Ancient Survivors of the Deep".
