= Crassicorophium =

Scientific classification
- Domain: Eukaryota
- Kingdom: Animalia
- Phylum: Arthropoda
- Class: Malacostraca
- Order: Amphipoda
- Family: Corophiidae
- Genus: Crassicorophium; Bousfield & Hoover, 1997

Genus of crustaceans

Crassicorophium is a genus of amphipod crustaceans, comprising three species:

- Crassicorophium bonellii (Milne Edwards, 1830)
- Crassicorophium clarencense (Shoemaker, 1949)
- Crassicorophium crassicorne (Bruzelius, 1859)
