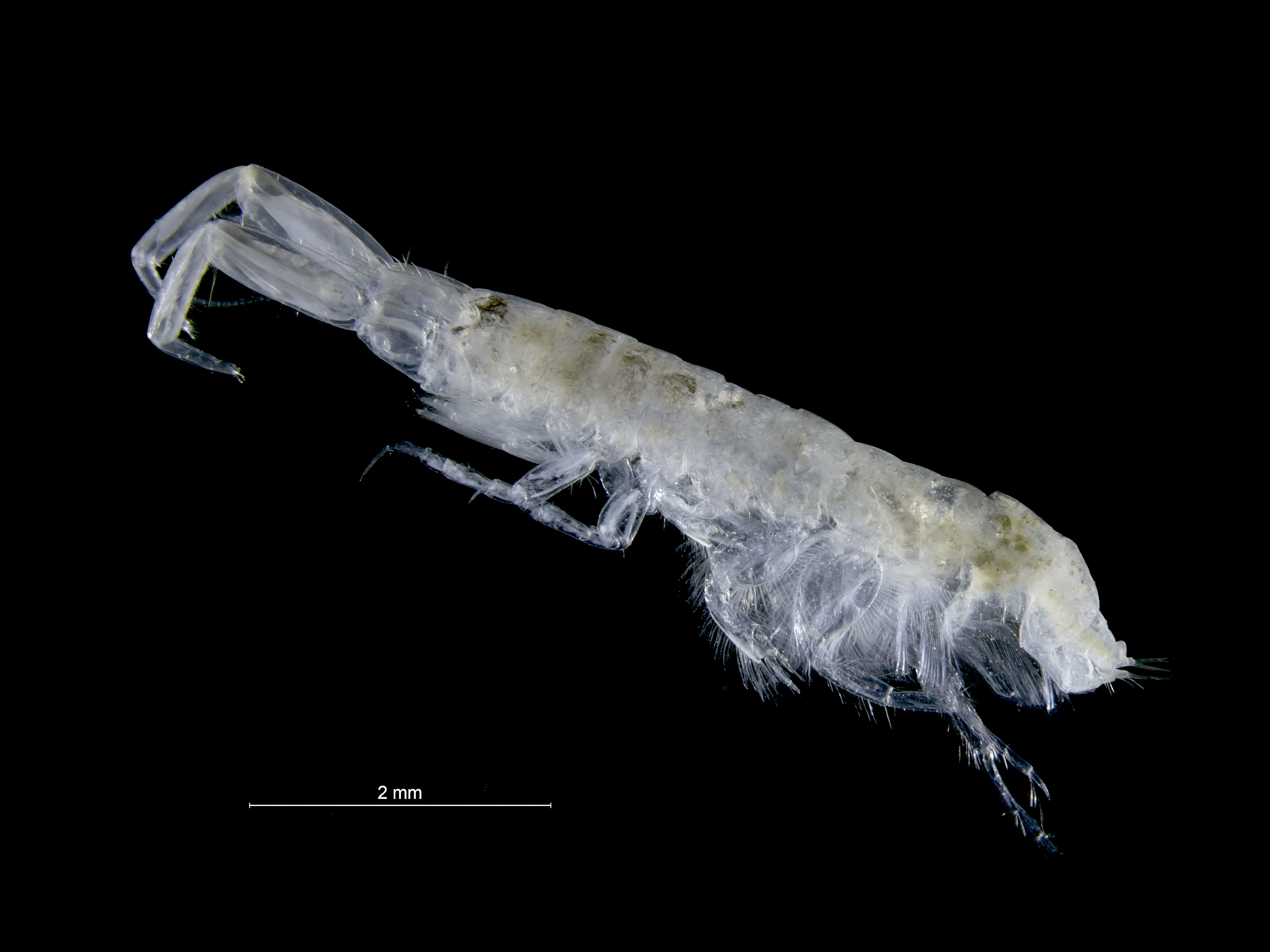
- Monocorophium acherusicum

Scientific classification
- Domain: Eukaryota
- Kingdom: Animalia
- Phylum: Arthropoda
- Class: Malacostraca
- Order: Amphipoda
- Family: Corophiidae
- Subfamily: Corophiinae
- Tribe: Corophiini
- Genus: Monocorophium; Bousfield & Hoover, 1997

= Monocorophium =

Genus of crustaceans

Monocorophium is a genus of amphipod crustaceans.

== Species ==
The genus Monocorophium comprises the following species:

- Monocorophium acherusicum (Costa, 1853)
- Monocorophium californianum (Shoemaker, 1934)
- Monocorophium carlottensis Bousfield & Hoover, 1997
- Monocorophium cylindricum (Say, 1818)
- Monocorophium insidiosum (Crawford, 1937)
- Monocorophium josei Valério-Berardo & Thiago de Souza, 2009
- Monocorophium oaklandense (Shoemaker, 1949)
- Monocorophium sextonae (Crawford, 1937)
- Monocorophium steinegeri (Gurjanova, 1951)
- Monocorophium tuberculatum (Shoemaker, 1934)
- Monocorophium uenoi (Stephensen, 1932)
