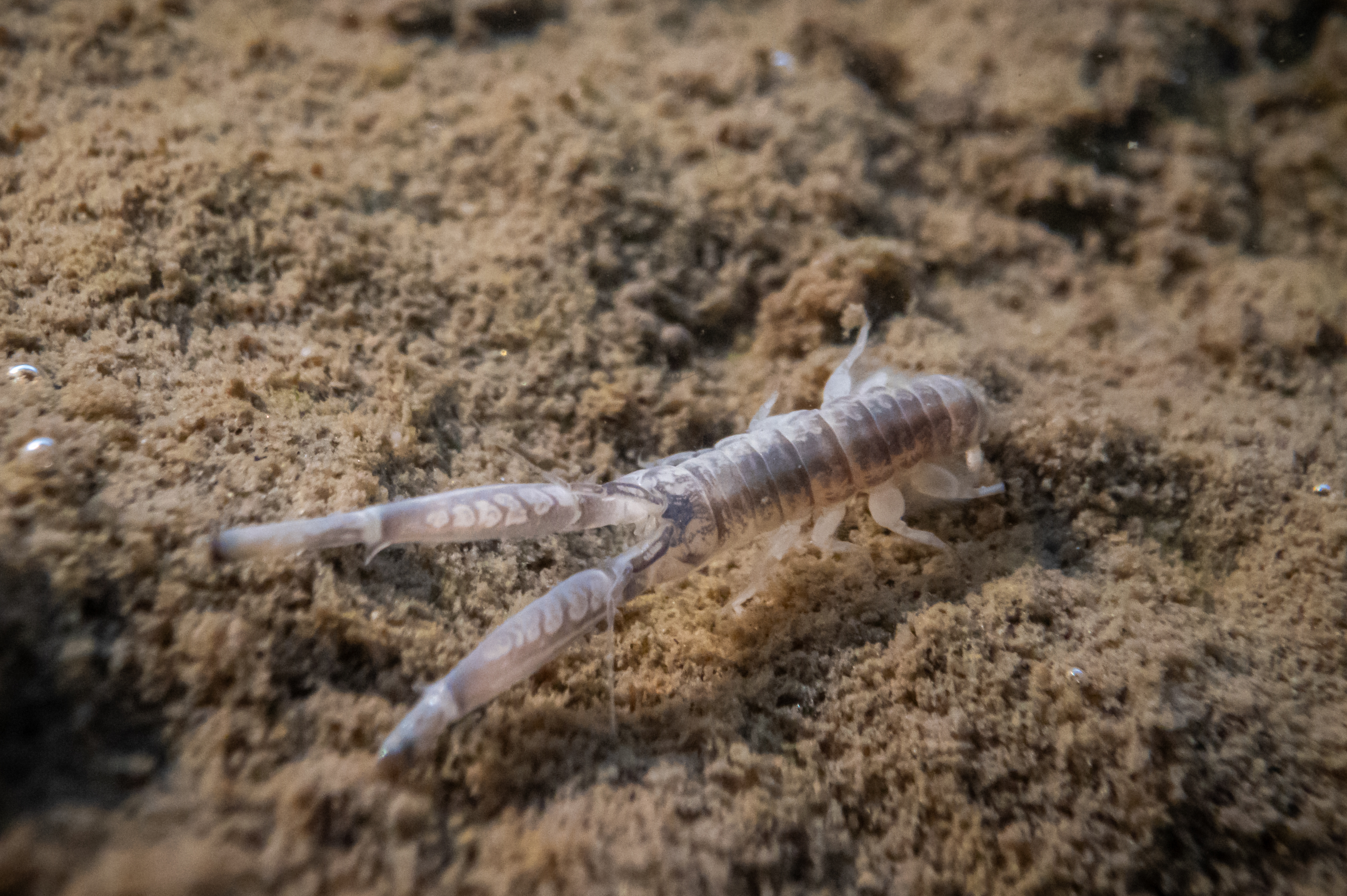

Scientific classification
- Kingdom: Animalia
- Phylum: Arthropoda
- Clade: Pancrustacea
- Class: Malacostraca
- Order: Amphipoda
- Family: Corophiidae
- Genus: Corophium
- Species: C. volutator

Binomial name
- Corophium volutator (Pallas, 1766)

Synonyms
- Oniscus volutator Pallas, 1766; Corophium grossipes Templeton, 1836; Corophium longicorne White, 1847

= Corophium volutator =

Species of crustacean

Corophium volutator is a species of amphipod crustacean in the family Corophiidae. It is found in mudflats of the northern Atlantic Ocean. It is native to the north-east Atlantic Ocean, and has been introduced to the north-west Atlantic.

== Description ==
Corophium volutator is a slender animal, up to 11 millimetres (0.43 in) long, "whitish with brown markings". The head bears two pairs of antennae, the first of which are small and point forward, while the distinctive second pair are much longer and thicker.

== Life cycle ==
There are 1–2 generations per year, and the females brood the eggs inside their brood pouch or marsupium. They can occur in huge quantities: up to 60,000 per square metre have been observed.
