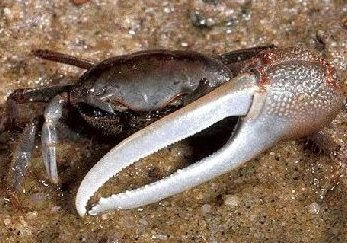

Scientific classification
- Kingdom: Animalia
- Phylum: Arthropoda
- Class: Malacostraca
- Order: Decapoda
- Suborder: Pleocyemata
- Infraorder: Brachyura
- Family: Ocypodidae
- Subfamily: Gelasiminae
- Genus: Minuca
- Species: M. pugnax

Binomial name
- Minuca pugnax (S. I. Smith, 1870)

Synonyms
- Gelasimus pugnax S. I. Smith, 1870; Uca pugnax (S. I. Smith, 1870)

= Minuca pugnax =

Species of crab

Minuca pugnax, commonly known as the Atlantic marsh fiddler crab, is a species of fiddler crab that lives on north-western shores of the Atlantic Ocean.

== Distribution ==
Minuca pugnax is the most common species of fiddler crab on the east coast of the United States. Its natural range extends from Cape Cod to northern Florida. In 2014, its northern limit was extended to Hampton, New Hampshire, as a result of a range expansion possibly due to climate change. Prior to the 2000s, studies suggested that its habitat range was limited to low-marsh habitats such as creeks, bay fronts, and mosquito ditches that are regularly flooded by the tide; the number of crabs decreased substantially in high-marsh habitats. Reports also indicated that Minuca pugnax would burrow during high tide and not reemerge until the tide had receded. The habitat was therefore restricted to areas where burrows were available to occupy and could be constructed. However reports in the 2010s began noting higher than expected numbers of Minuca pugnax in high-marsh areas along the Long Island Sound and in Rhode Island.

Minuca pugnax has a mutualistic relationship with Spartina alterniflora, a perennial deciduous grass found in intertidal wetlands; the plants provide structural support necessary for the crabs' burrows and the burrowing itself increases production of the grass. However, in bare areas of the marshes caused by human disruption, the burrowing can damage the S. alterniflora seedlings by disturbing the soil, which also increases sediment in the water column and reduce the amount of organic matter in the soil. All of these can increase the negative impacts of sea level rise on wetland ecosystems.

== Description ==
There is noticeable sexual dimorphism in Minuca pugnax. Although both males and females are olive-brown in color, males have a carapace width of 15–23 mm (0.59–0.91 in), and a patch of royal blue on the carapace, while females lack the blue patch and are only 13–18 mm (0.51–0.71 in) across the carapace. In both sexes, the pereiopods (walking legs) have dark bands, and the eyestalks are narrow. The most conspicuous difference is the form of the chelipeds (claw-bearing legs); in females, they are similar, while in males, one is greatly enlarged and colored yellow.

== Life cycle ==
The males use circular movements of their large cheliped to attract a mate. Mating occurs up to every two weeks, typically 4–5 days after the spring tides, over a period lasting from June to September. It takes place in a burrow, after which the female will brood her eggs for 12–15 days before releasing the hatchling larvae on the high spring tides. The larvae pass through five planktonic zoea and one megalopa stages before settling to the sea floor to molt into the adult form. This process takes around 28 days. After one year, the crab reaches sexual maturity, and adult life span is typically 12–18 months.

== Taxonomic history ==
Minuca pugnax was first described by Sidney Irving Smith in 1870, as "Gelasimus pugnax". Its common names include "marsh fiddler crab", "mud fiddler crab", "Atlantic mud fiddler crab" and "Atlantic marsh fiddler crab".

Minuca pugnax was formerly a member of the genus Uca, but in 2016 it was placed in the genus Minuca, a former subgenus of Uca.
