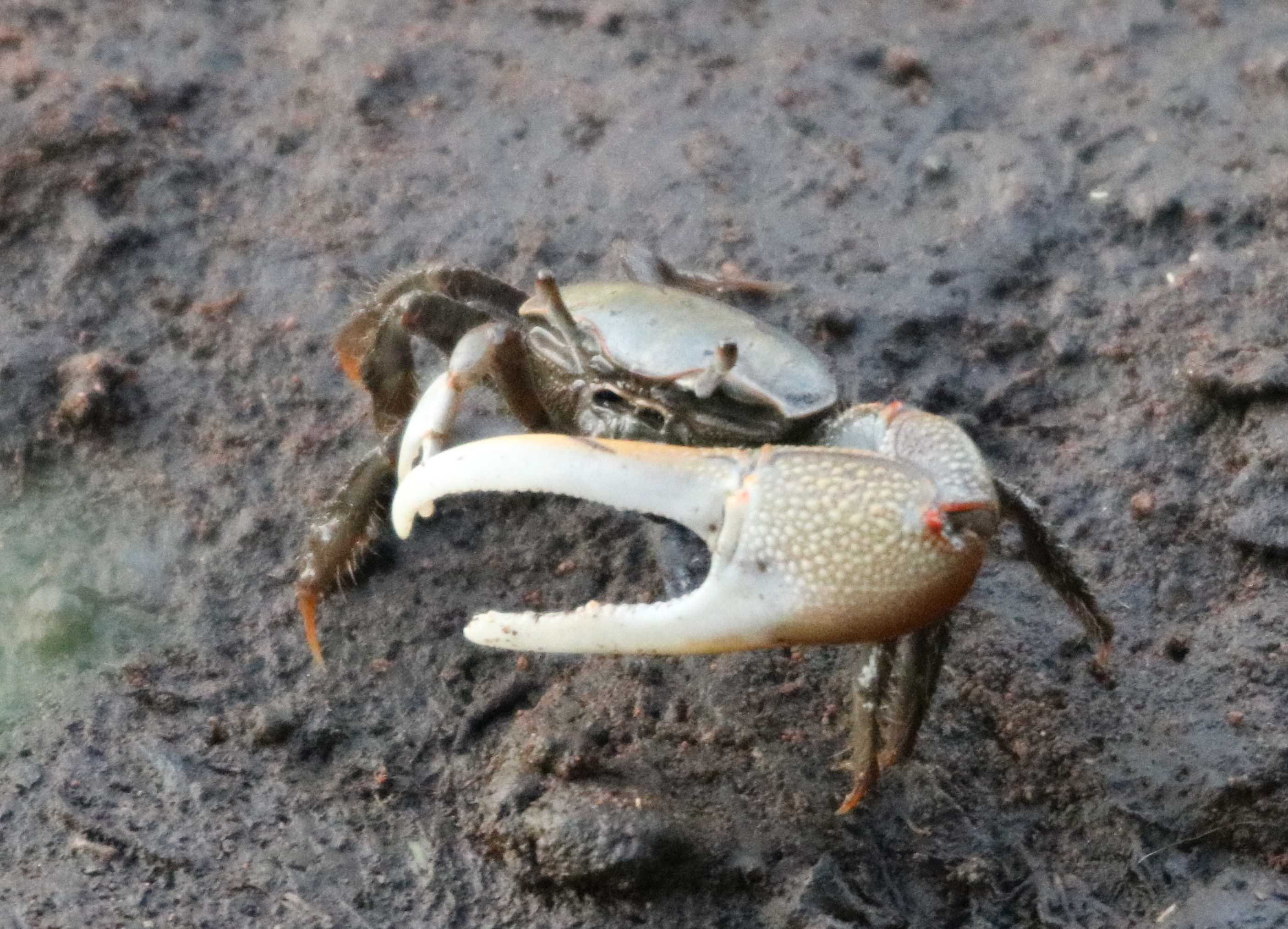

Scientific classification
- Domain: Eukaryota
- Kingdom: Animalia
- Phylum: Arthropoda
- Class: Malacostraca
- Order: Decapoda
- Suborder: Pleocyemata
- Infraorder: Brachyura
- Family: Ocypodidae
- Subfamily: Gelasiminae
- Tribe: Minucini
- Genus: Minuca
- Species: M. minax

Binomial name
- Minuca minax (Le Conte, 1855)

= Minuca minax =

Species of crab

Minuca minax, commonly known as the red‐jointed fiddler crab or brackish-water fiddler crab, is a species of fiddler crab that is found in the United States from Massachusetts to the Gulf of Mexico. It is one of the most common macroinvertebrates in salt marshes in these states. It prefers areas of lower salinity than other fiddler crabs, and can be found in great numbers along the banks of tidal streams, even at distances greater than 50 km (31 mi) from the sea.

Minuca minax was formerly in the genus Uca, but in 2016 it was placed in the genus Minuca, a former subgenus of Uca.

== Description ==
Like other fiddler crabs, Minuca minax males have one claw that is significantly larger than the other, while females have two equal-sized smaller claws. The joints on the claws are red, a noticeable feature that is the origin of the common name "red‐jointed fiddler crab".

== Reproduction ==
Minuca minax breed for two weeks in the summer in a small round burrow dug by the male. The larvae are unable to survive in the lower-salinity brackish water preferred by adults, and the adults do not travel to the sea to release the larvae. As such, the larvae use ebb tides to travel to higher-salinity environments to develop before returning as adults.
