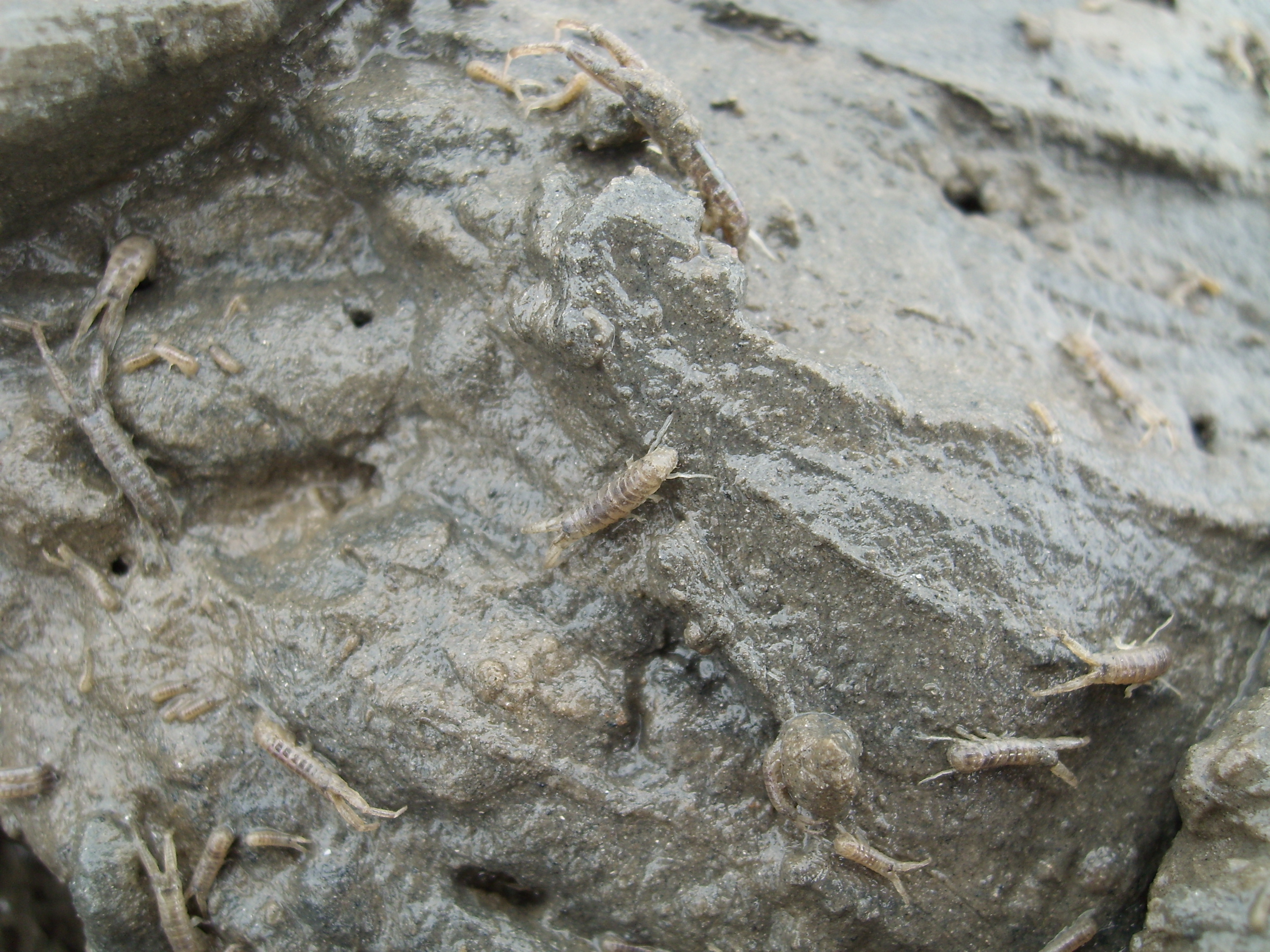
- Corophium volutator

Scientific classification
- Kingdom: Animalia
- Phylum: Arthropoda
- Clade: Pancrustacea
- Class: Malacostraca
- Order: Amphipoda
- Suborder: Senticaudata
- Infraorder: Corophiida
- Parvorder: Corophiidira
- Superfamily: Corophioidea
- Family: Corophiidae; Leach, 1814

= Corophiidae =

Family of crustaceans

Corophiidae is a family of amphipods, containing the following genera:

- Americorophium Bousfield & Hoover, 1997
- Anonychocheirus Moore & Myers, 1983
- Apocorophium Bousfield & Hoover, 1997
- Bathyphotis Stephensen, 1944
- Chaetocorophium (Hurley, 1954)
- Cheirimedeia J. L. Barnard, 1962
- Cheiriphotis Walker, 1904
- Chelicorophium Bousfield & Hoover, 1997
- Comacho
- Corophium Latreille, 1806
- Crassicorophium Bousfield & Hoover, 1997
- Eocorophium Bousfield & Hoover, 1997
- Goesia Boeck, 1871
- Hansenella Chevreux, 1909
- Haplocheira Haswell, 1879
- Hirayamaia Bousfield & Hoover, 1997
- Kuphocheira K. H. Barnard, 1931
- Laticorophium Bousfield & Hoover, 1997
- Leptocheirus Zaddach, 1884
- Lobatocorophium Bousfield & Hoover, 1997
- Medicorophium Bousfield & Hoover, 1997
- Microcorophium Bousfield & Hoover, 1997
- Monocorophium Bousfield & Hoover, 1997
- Neohela S. I. Smith, 1881
- Paracorophium Stebbing, 1899
- Pareurystheus Tzvetkova, 1977
- Plumiliophotis Myers, 2009
- Protomedeia Krøyer, 1842
- Pseudunciola Bousfield, 1973
- Sinocorophium Bousfield & Hoover, 1997
- Stenocorophium G. Karaman, 1979
