= Microphallus piriformes =

Scientific classification
- Domain: Eukaryota
- Kingdom: Animalia
- Phylum: Platyhelminthes
- Class: Trematoda
- Order: Plagiorchiida
- Family: Microphallidae
- Genus: Microphallus
- Species: M. piriformes

Binomial name
- Microphallus piriformes Galaktionov, 1983

Species of fluke

Microphallus piriformes is a parasitic trematode (fluke). It belongs to the Xiphidiata, a large suborder of the digenean fluke order Plagiorchiida. M. piriformes is unusual among the flukes in having only one intermediate host rather than two, and no free-swimming cercarian stage.

It is most notable, however, for modifying the behaviour of its intermediate host in a way that increases its chance of transmission to the primary host. This has been researched by Helen O. McCarthy and her team of University of Ulster scientists both in the laboratory and at Muck Island in Scotland.

== Ecology ==
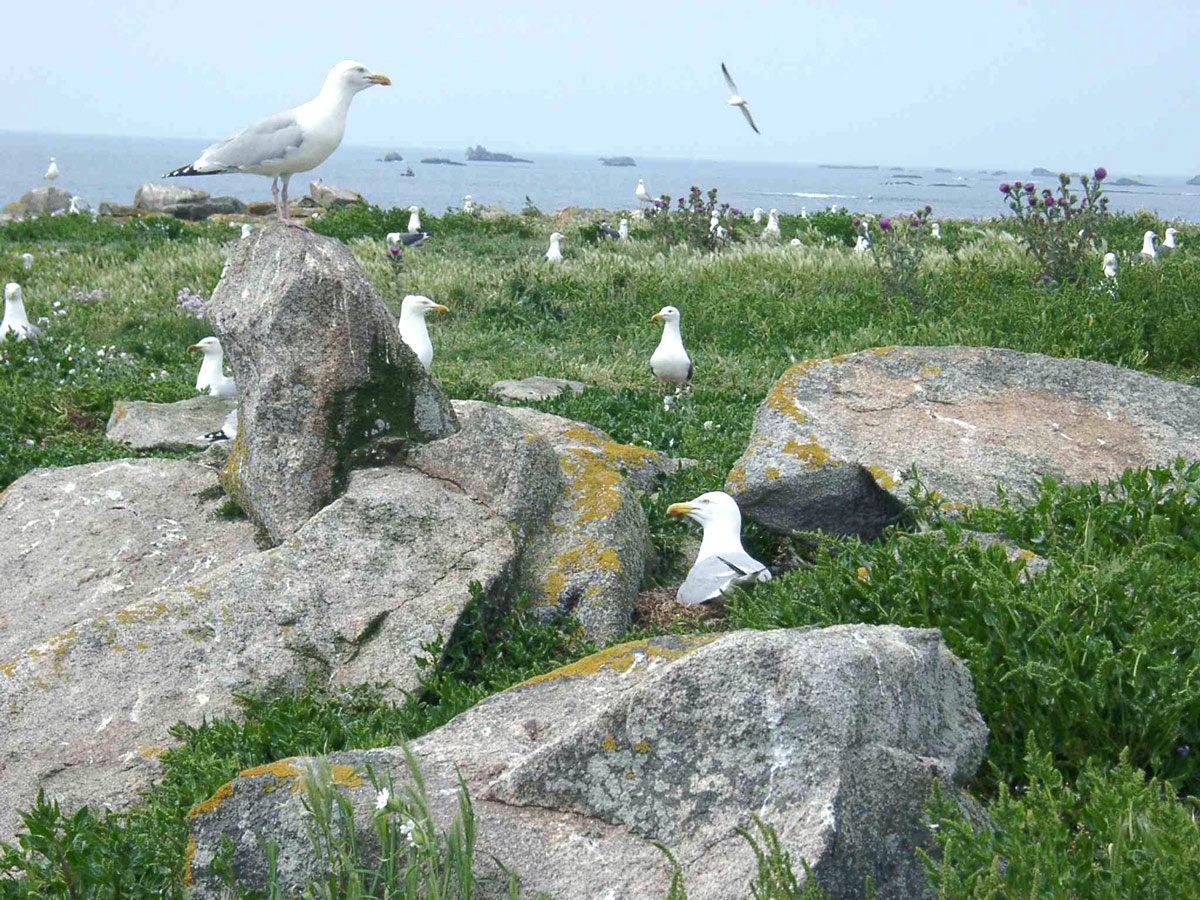
The herring gull (here: Larus argentatus argenteus) often eats periwinkles during breeding season, but only rarely at other times

The life cycle of M. piriformes requires two hosts: the rough periwinkle Littorina saxatilis (a littoral snail) and the herring gull Larus argentatus (and perhaps other members of the herring gull complex). The immature flukes live in the snail, and the adult flukes live in the bird.

Normally, rough periwinkles are rarely eaten by herring gulls. This is due to two reasons: First, the birds forage in the snails' rocky shore habitat mainly during the breeding season (which lasts about 4 months each summer) but not at other times. Second, periwinkles move with the tides to stay at the water line. Thus, even when the gulls forage in periwinkle habitat, the snails tend to stay out of easy reach of the birds.

It is not precisely known how the snails are infected; probably they eat the eggs directly from the gulls' feces. The eggs hatch into a miracidium stage, which develops into multiple sporocysts. Rather than further developing into a cercaria which leaves the snail to infect the second intermediate host as usual for trematodes, they directly develop into encysted metacercariae in the snail. Infection castrates the periwinkles; brooding L. saxatilis generally move only to avoid being left above water by the tide while non-brooding (including castrated) periwinkles are more active.

As soon as the flukes have reached the metacercarian stage, they alter the periwinkles' behaviour: Rather than moving to stay near the water line, the infected snails develop a pronounced tendency to move upwards. This becomes most pronounced shortly before high tide, and thus the periwinkles carrying mature metacercariae are left a considerable distance above water when the tide recedes. This makes them far more accessible to the foraging gulls than uninfected conspecifics, which will often move up when the tide is highest to feed on algae which they cannot otherwise access, but return underwater as soon as the tide recedes to avoid desiccation.

Once the snails are eaten by herring gulls, the metacercariae hatch into mature flukes. These mate and produce eggs which are shed with the bird's feces. Their adult lifespan is a mere two weeks; several generations are thus produced each summer. It is unknown whether M. piriformes spends the winter as resting eggs in the habitat, or as sporocysts in already-infected periwinkles. In any case, snails harboring metacercariae generally die of desiccation before winter if they are not eaten.

== See also ==
Other parasites that modify intermediate host behavior to facilitate transmission:

- Dicrocoelium dendriticum, a fluke
- Corynosoma constrictum, a thorny-headed worm
- Gynaecotyla adunca, a fluke
- Hymenolepis diminuta, a tapeworm
- Polymorphus paradoxus, a thorny-headed worm
