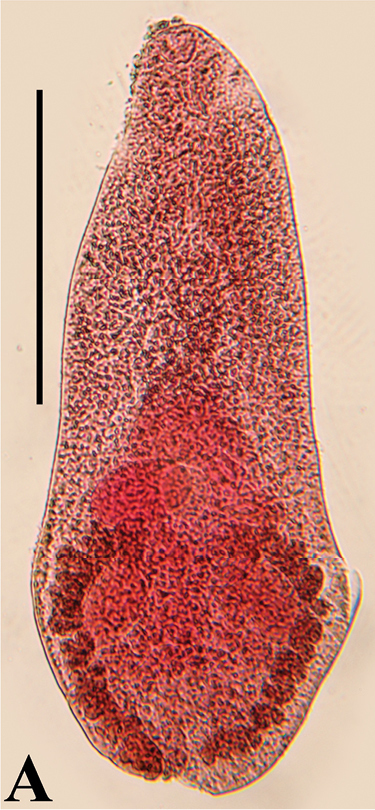

Scientific classification
- Kingdom: Animalia
- Phylum: Platyhelminthes
- Class: Trematoda
- Order: Plagiorchiida
- Family: Microphallidae
- Genus: Microphallus
- Species: M. nicolli

Binomial name
- Microphallus nicolli (Cable and Hunninen, 1938)

= Microphallus nicolli =

Species of fluke

Microphallus nicolli is a species of digenean parasite in the genus Microphallus. Recorded hosts include the marsh rice rat (Oryzomys palustris) in a saltmarsh at Cedar Key, Florida, where the crab Eurytium limosum is an intermediate host, and the sea otter (Enhydra lutris) in central California. It was previously known as Spelotrema nicolli.

== Literature cited ==
- Kinsella, J.M. 1988. Comparison of helminths of rice rats, Oryzomys palustris, from freshwater and saltwater marshes in Florida. Proceedings of the Helminthological Society of Washington 55(2):275–280.
- Mayer, K.A., Dailey, M.D. and Miller, M.A. 2003. Helminth parasites of the southern sea otter Enhydra lutris nereis in central California: abundance, distribution and pathology. Diseases of Aquatic Organisms 53:77–88.
