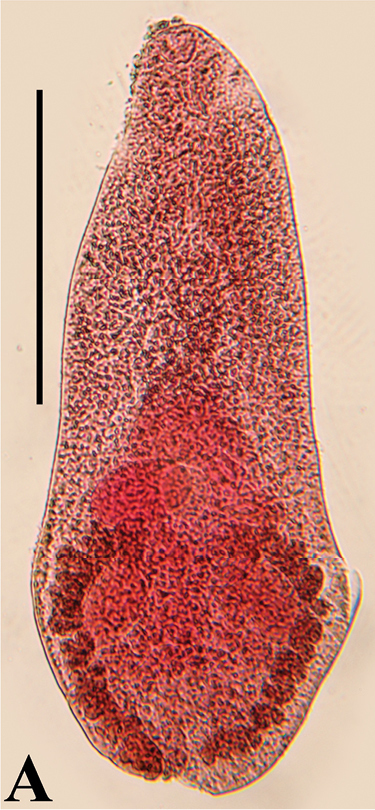
- Microphallus nicolli, a species in the Microphallus genus

Scientific classification
- Kingdom: Animalia
- Phylum: Platyhelminthes
- Class: Trematoda
- Order: Plagiorchiida
- Family: Microphallidae
- Genus: Microphallus; Ward, 1901

Species
- Microphallus abortivus; Microphallus basodactylophallus; Microphallus bassodactylus; Microphallus breviatus; Microphallus claviformis; Microphallus fonti; Microphallus hoffmanni; Microphallus limuli; Microphallus nicolli; Microphallus opacus; Microphallus papillorobustus; Microphallus piriformes; Microphallus pirum; Microphallus primas; Microphallus pseudopygmaeus; Microphallus pygmaeus; Microphallus sabanensis; Microphallus similis; Microphallus turgidus

Synonyms
- Carneophallus

= Microphallus =

Genus of worms

Microphallus is a genus of parasitic trematodes (flukes) in the family Microphallidae. The Greek name means "tiny penis".

== Hosts ==
They are parasitic on a variety of molluscs, crustaceans, birds, and mammals, some species having complex life cycles involving more than one host.

For example, Microphallus piriformes parasitizes the rough periwinkle (Littorina saxatilis); when these are eaten by herring gulls it infects the bird and lays its eggs in the bird's feces to infect new periwinkles.

Other intermediate hosts include, for example New Zealand mud snail Potamopyrgus antipodarum and others.

== Parasite-host interactions ==
Several species are notable for manipulating or influencing their hosts. Microphallus piriformes causes its host, the rough periwinkle, to move upwards, making it more vulnerable to predation by herring gulls. Microphallus pseudopygmaeus chemically castrates (parasitic castration) its host, the snail Onoba aculeus, and causes it to grow larger than normal (it is not clear if this gigantism benefits the host or parasite or if it is a non-adaptive side-effect). Microphallus papillorobustus causes its host, the lagoon sand shrimp (Gammarus insensibilis) to swim upwards, making it more vulnerable to predation. Some species of this genus "hitch-hike" on the manipulations of other species; for example, Microphallus hoffmanni parasitizes the same sand shrimps as Microphallus papillorobustus but does not manipulate the shrimps itself, instead benefiting from the latter's manipulation of the host.

== Life cycle ==
An undescribed Microphallus species is a widespread and locally common parasite in New Zealand lakes and streams. Multilocus allozyme genotype data show that this Microphallus is a single outbred species with high levels of gene flow among South Island populations. The parasite exclusively uses Potamopyrgus antipodarum as the intermediate host, and the final hosts are waterfowl. Embryonated Microphallus eggs are ingested from sediment and hatch in the snail's gut, penetrate the intestine, and migrate to the gonads and digestive gland. Following successful establishment, the parasite then undergoes asexual reproduction, replacing much of the host's reproductive tissue and digestive gland, which results in complete sterilization of the snail. The first visible parasite developmental stages (blastocercariae) are detectable after approximately 75 days post-exposure and metacercariae are common by 90 days post-exposure at 16 °C in the lab. The life cycle is completed when snails containing metacercariae are consumed by waterfowl.
