= Maritrema prosthometra =

Scientific classification
- Domain: Eukaryota
- Kingdom: Animalia
- Phylum: Platyhelminthes
- Class: Trematoda
- Order: Plagiorchiida
- Family: Microphallidae
- Genus: Maritrema
- Species: M. prosthometra

Binomial name
- Maritrema prosthometra Deblock and Heard, 1969

Species of fluke

Maritrema prosthometra is a parasitic fluke from North America. It was first described in 1969 from the intestine of the clapper rail (Rallus crepitans) in eastern North America. Later, it was also found in the small intestine of 5% of a sample of marsh rice rats (Oryzomys palustris) collected in a salt marsh at Cedar Key, Florida, where it used the fiddler crab Uca pugilator as an intermediate host.

== Literature cited ==
- Deblock, S. and Heard, R.W. 1969. Contribution à l'étude des Microphallidae Travassos, 1920 (Trematoda). 21. Description de Maritrema prosthometra n. sp. et de Longiductotrema nov. gen. parasites d'oiseaux Ralliformes d'Amerique du Nord. Annales de Parasitologie Humaine et Comparée 44:415–424.
- Kinsella, J.M. 1988. Comparison of helminths of rice rats, Oryzomys palustris, from freshwater and saltwater marshes in Florida. Proceedings of the Helminthological Society of Washington 55(2):275–280.
