= Maritrema =

Scientific classification
- Domain: Eukaryota
- Kingdom: Animalia
- Phylum: Platyhelminthes
- Class: Trematoda
- Order: Plagiorchiida
- Family: Microphallidae
- Subfamily: Maritrematinae
- Genus: Maritrema; Nikoll, 1907

Type species
- Maritrema gratiosum Nikoll, 1907

Species
- See text

Synonyms
- Floridatrema Kinsella and Debloch, 1994

Genus of flukes

Maritrema is a genus of trematodes (flukes) in the family Microphallidae, although some have suggested its placement in the separate family Maritrematidae. It was first described by Nikoll in 1907 from birds in Britain. Species of the genus usually infect birds, but several have switched hosts and are found in mammals, such as the marsh rice rat. Several species use the fiddler crab Uca pugilator as an intermediate host.

Species include:

- Maritrema acadiae (Swales, 1933)
- Maritrema arenaria Hadley and Castle, 1940
- Maritrema bonaerensis Etchegoin and Martorelli, 1997
- Maritrema carpathica Matskasi, 1984
- Maritrema chiriacae Deblock, 1975
- Maritrema feliui Gracenea, Montoliu and Deblock, 1993
- Maritrema gratiosum Nikoll, 1907
- Maritrema heardi (Kinsella and Deblock, 1994)
- Maritrema humile Nikoll, 1907
- Maritrema lepidum Nikoll, 1907
- Maritrema majestova Ke, 1976
- Maritrema neomi Tkoch, 1998
- Maritrema oocysta Lebour, 1907
- Maritrema paracadiae Ching, 1974
- Maritrema prosthometra Deblock and Heard, 1969
- Maritrema pulcherrima Travassos, 1928
- Maritrema pyrenaica Deblock and Combes, 1965
- Maritrema subdolum Jägerskiöld, 1909
- Maritrema Poulini
- Maritrema novaezealandense

An undescribed species, "Maritrema sp. I", is known from clapper rails (Rallus crepitans) and marsh rice rats (Oryzomys palustris) in the eastern United States. M. heardi was placed in a separate genus Floridatrema upon its description in 1994 on the basis of a morphological difference, but was reassigned to Maritrema in 2005, as molecular data indicated that Maritrema would be paraphyletic without the inclusion of the species.

== Literature cited ==
- Etchegoin, J.A.; Martorelli, S.R. (1997). "Description of a new species of Maritrema (Digenea: Microphallidae) from Mar Chiquita coastal lagoon (Buenos Aires, Argentina) with notes on its life cycle". The Journal of Parasitology. 83 (4): 709–713. doi:10.2307/3284251. JSTOR 3284251. PMID 9267416.
- Kinsella, J.M. (1988). "Comparison of helminths of rice rats, Oryzomys palustris, from freshwater and saltwater marshes in Florida". Proceedings of the Helminthological Society of Washington. 55 (2): 275–280.
- Kinsella, J.M; Deblock, S. (1994). "Contribution à l'étude des Microphallidae Travassos, 1920 (Trematoda). XLVI. - Description de Floridatrema heardi n. gen., n. sp., parasite d'Oryzomys palustris (Mammifère) des États-unis". Parasite. 1 (1): 45–50. doi:10.1051/parasite/1994011045. ISSN 1252-607X. PMID 9235193.
- Nikoll, W. (1907). "Observations on the trematode parasites of British birds". Annals and Magazine of Natural History. 7 (20): 245–271. doi:10.1080/00222930709487332.
- Tkach, V.V.; Littlewood, D.T.J.; Olson, P.D.; Kinsella, J.M.; Swiderski, Z. (2003). "Molecular phylogenetic analysis of the Microphalloidea Ward, 1901 (Trematoda: Digenea)". Systematic Parasitology. 56 (1): 1–15. doi:10.1023/a:1025546001611. PMID 12975618. S2CID 4801094.
