= Microphallus basodactylophallus =

Scientific classification
- Domain: Eukaryota
- Kingdom: Animalia
- Phylum: Platyhelminthes
- Class: Trematoda
- Order: Plagiorchiida
- Family: Microphallidae
- Genus: Microphallus
- Species: M. basodactylophallus

Binomial name
- Microphallus basodactylophallus (Bridgman, 1969)

Species of fluke

Microphallus basodactylophallus is a species of digenean parasite in the family Microphallidae. It was first described in 1969, as Carneophallus basodactylophallus, from southern Louisiana, where the raccoon (Procyon lotor) is the definitive host, the first intermediate host is the snail Lyrodes parvula, and the second intermediate host is the crab Callinectes sapidus. It was later moved to the genus Microphallus. In 1988, John Kinsella recorded it from the marsh rice rat (Oryzomys palustris) in a saltmarsh at Cedar Key, Florida. There, it was one of the most prevalent parasites in the marsh rice rat and used C. sapidus as an intermediate host.

== Literature cited ==
- Bridgman, John F. (1969). "Life cycles of Carneophallus choanophallus n. sp. and C. basodactylophallus n. sp. (Trematoda: Microphallidae)". Tulane Studies in Zoology and Botany. 15: 81–104.
- Kinsella, J.M. 1988. Comparison of helminths of rice rats, Oryzomys palustris, from freshwater and saltwater marshes in Florida. Proceedings of the Helminthological Society of Washington 55(2):275–280.
