= Microphallus turgidus =

Scientific classification
- Kingdom: Animalia
- Phylum: Platyhelminthes
- Class: Trematoda
- Order: Plagiorchiida
- Family: Microphallidae
- Genus: Microphallus
- Species: M. turgidus

Binomial name
- Microphallus turgidus (Leigh, 1958)

Synonyms
- Carneophallus turgidus

Species of fluke

Microphallus turgidus is a widespread and locally common flatworm parasite in New Zealand lakes and streams. Multilocus allozyme genotype data show that Microphallus turgidus is a single outbred species with high levels of gene flow among South Island populations. Microphallus turgidus is commonly found in the abdominal muscles of grass shrimp.

== Life cycle ==
Microphallus turgidus exclusively uses the snail Potamopyrgus antipodarum as the first intermediate host, a shrimp as the secondary intermediate host, and the final hosts are typically waterfowl. Embryonated Microphallus turgidus eggs are ingested from sediment and hatch in the snail's gut, penetrate the intestine, and migrate to the gonads and digestive gland. Following successful establishment, the parasite then undergoes asexual reproduction, replacing much of the host's reproductive tissue and digestive gland, which results in complete sterilization of the snail. The first visible parasite developmental stages (blastocercariae) are detectable after approximately 75 days post-exposure and metacercariae are common by 90 days post-exposure at 16 °C in the lab. The life cycle continues through a secondary intermediate host, such as the glass shrimp Palaemonetes pugio, and is completed when the shrimp infected by the metacercariae are consumed by waterfowl or mammals.

== Host ==
Microphallus turgidus are more common in wild animals that live in salt marshes and are considered as definite host. The first intermediate host is the hydrobiid snail, on its immature form called a cercaria, it develops into snail. The most common is the second intermediate hosts, grass shrimp, Palaemonetes pugio. Metacercariae of the parasite usually encyst in grass shrimp abdominal muscle, and though adult P. pugio average only 2.9 cm in length, a shrimp can be infected with more than 100 parasites.

== Symptoms / effects ==
Numerous reports of changes in the host behavior after the parasitic infection influenced the host-parasite survival, host predation, and parasite transmission. Parasite induced behavior changes include hyperactivity, sluggishness, fatigue, disorientation, altered habitat selection, and reduced predator avoidance. In fact, it is rare are to find a locality where the grass shrimp Palaemonetes pugio is not infected.

At certain shrimp collection sites, near all specimens of P. pugio are infected, some with more than 100 parasites. The intensity of infection varies from one locality to another and may be due, at least partially, to geographic differences in salinity. Heavily infected shrimp are more likely to be eaten by a predator than uninfected shrimp, have lower swimming stamina, and spend more time swimming and less time motionless in the presence of a predator. Thus, M. turgidus may increase the predation of P. pugio in the wild.
