= Maritrema subdolum =

Scientific classification
- Domain: Eukaryota
- Kingdom: Animalia
- Phylum: Platyhelminthes
- Class: Trematoda
- Order: Plagiorchiida
- Family: Microphallidae
- Genus: Maritrema
- Species: M. subdolum

Binomial name
- Maritrema subdolum Jägerskiöld, 1909

Species of fluke

Maritrema subdolum is a species of parasitic fluke found in the Wadden Sea. It is related to the New Zealand species Maritrema novaezealandensis, and like its New Zealand relative, Maritrema subdolum infects local amphipods, in this case, Corophium volutator and Corophium arenarium. The cercariae of M. subdolum emerge from the first intermediate host, a gastropod of the genus Hydrobia for example, and seek out the next host, a crustacean. There the cercariae develop into metacercariae and form metacercarial cysts of different sizes.

== Morphology ==
Maritrema subdolum has 2 layers: an inner transparent and an outer light-refractory layer. The latter encloses either the entire body or only the anterior end. It lies in a pouch formed by an invagination of the tegument of the oral sucker and its posterior end is surrounded in the syncytial layer at the base of the pouch in close contact with the basal membrane. The anterior end is limited only by an external plasmatic membrane. The cercarial body is a strongly developed tegumental spine.

== Pathogenicity ==
Maritrema subdolum is the bane of the local crustacean population. The main transmission window of M. subdolum seems to occur during low water in tidal pools where light levels are high and solar radiation rapidly elevates the water temperature, as well as salinity through evaporation. M. subdolum does not affect all of its crustacean hosts equally and this has some important ecological consequences.
