= Maritrema heardi =

Scientific classification
- Domain: Eukaryota
- Kingdom: Animalia
- Phylum: Platyhelminthes
- Class: Trematoda
- Order: Plagiorchiida
- Family: Microphallidae
- Genus: Maritrema
- Species: M. heardi

Binomial name
- Maritrema heardi (Kinsella and Deblock, 1994)

Synonyms
- Floridatrema kinsellai Kinsella and Deblock, 1994; Maritrema kinsellai: Tkach et al., 2005

Species of fluke

Maritrema heardi is a parasitic fluke that infects the marsh rice rat (Oryzomys palustris) in a salt marsh at Cedar Key, Florida. It was first listed as Maritrema sp. II in 1988, then described as the only species of a new genus, Floridatrema heardi, in 1994, and eventually reassigned in 2003 to Maritrema as Maritrema heardi. Its intermediate host is the fiddler crab Uca pugilator and it lives in the intestine of the marsh rice rat, its definitive host. Together with two other species of Maritrema, it is very common in affected marsh rice rats; it infects 19% of studied rats at Cedar Key. According to Tkach and colleagues, M. heardi is probably primarily a parasite of birds that has secondarily infected the marsh rice rat. Floridatrema was distinguished from Maritrema on the basis of its possession of loops of the uterus that extend forward to the place where the intestine is forked or even to the pharynx. Genetically, M. heardi may be closest to the morphologically similar M. neomi, which infects Neomys water shrews in the Carpathians.

== Literature cited ==
- Kinsella, J.M. 1988. Comparison of helminths of rice rats, Oryzomys palustris, from freshwater and saltwater marshes in Florida. Proceedings of the Helminthological Society of Washington 55(2):275–280.
- Kinsella, J.M; Deblock, S. (1994). "Contribution à l'étude des Microphallidae Travassos, 1920 (Trematoda). XLVI. - Description de Floridatrema heardi n. gen., n. sp., parasite d'Oryzomys palustris (Mammifère) des États-unis". Parasite. 1 (1): 45–50. doi:10.1051/parasite/1994011045. ISSN 1252-607X. PMID 9235193.
- Tkach, V.V., Littlewood, D.T.J., Olson, P.D., Kinsella, J.M. and Swiderski, Z. 2003. Molecular phylogenetic analysis of the Microphalloidea Ward, 1901 (Trematoda: Digenea) (subscription required). Systematic Parasitology 56(1):1–15.
