= Gynaecotyla adunca =

Scientific classification
- Kingdom: Animalia
- Phylum: Platyhelminthes
- Class: Trematoda
- Order: Plagiorchiida
- Family: Microphallidae
- Genus: Gynaecotyla
- Species: G. adunca

Binomial name
- Gynaecotyla adunca (Linton, 1905)

Species of fluke

Gynaecotyla adunca is a fluke that normally infects birds. It has also been found in 15% of a sample of the marsh rice rat (Oryzomys palustris) from a salt marsh at Cedar Key, Florida. It uses fiddler crabs such as Uca rapax as its intermediate host.

== Literature cited ==
- Kinsella, J.M. 1988. Comparison of helminths of rice rats, Oryzomys palustris, from freshwater and saltwater marshes in Florida. Proceedings of the Helminthological Society of Washington 55(2):275–280.
- Verberg, W.B. and Hunter, W.S. 1961. Studies on oxygen consumption in digenetic trematodes. V. The influence of temperature on three species of adult trematodes (subscription required). Experimental Parasitology 11(1):34–38.
