= Habitat =

Type of environment in which an organism lives

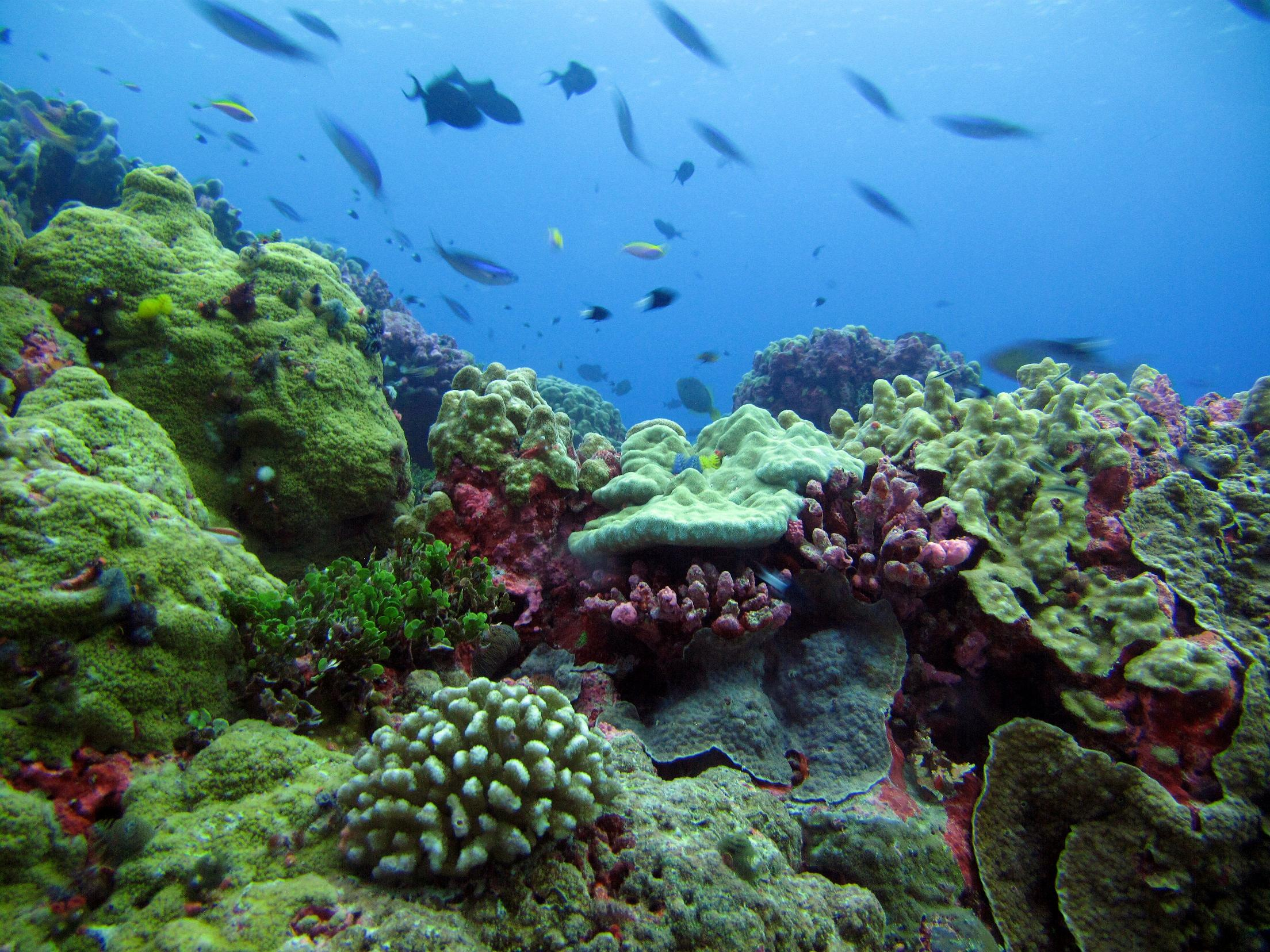
This coral reef in the Phoenix Islands Protected Area provides habitat for numerous marine species.

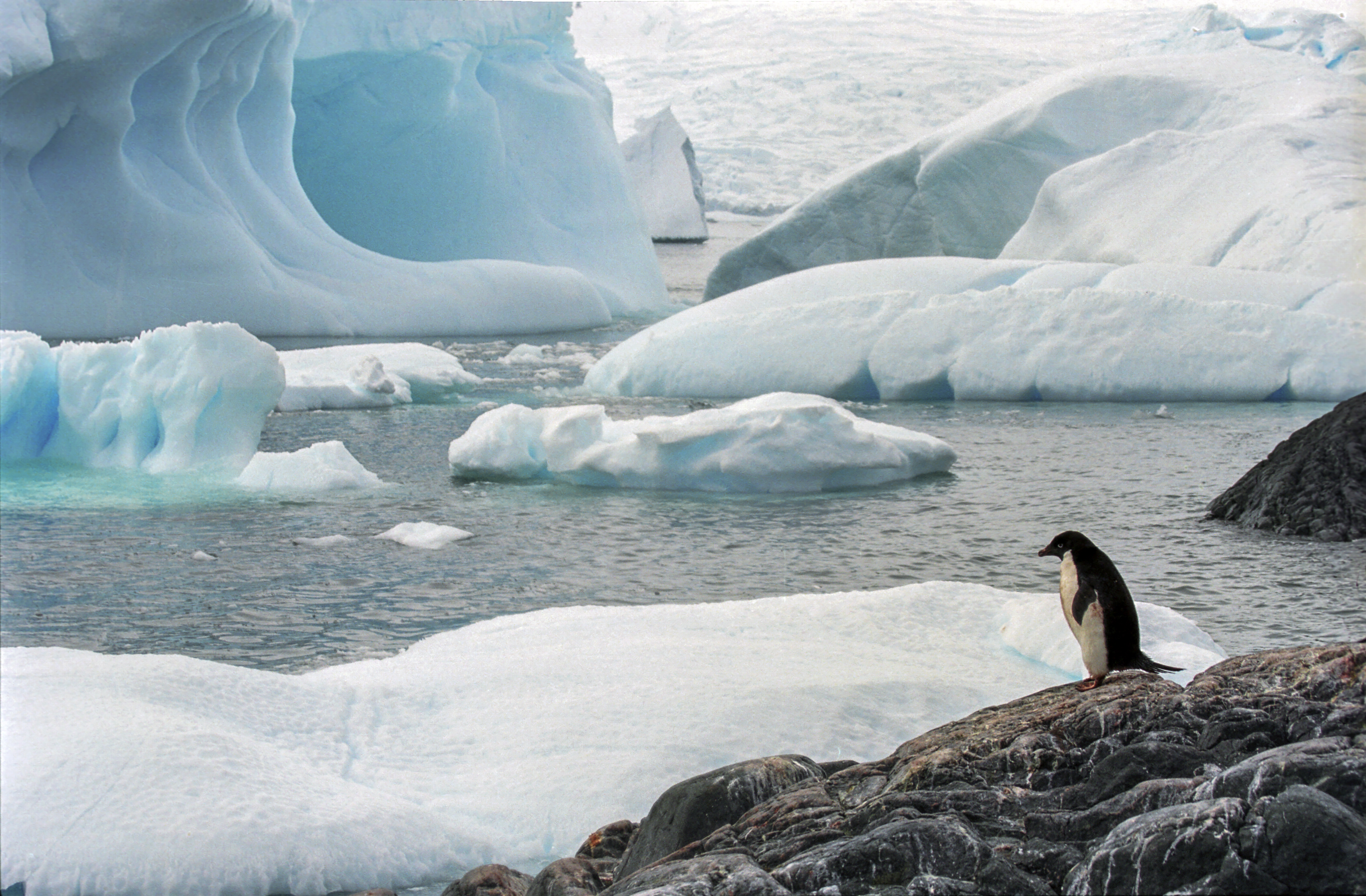
Few creatures make the ice shelves of Antarctica their habitat, but water beneath the ice can provide habitat for multiple species. Animals such as penguins have adapted to live in very cold conditions.

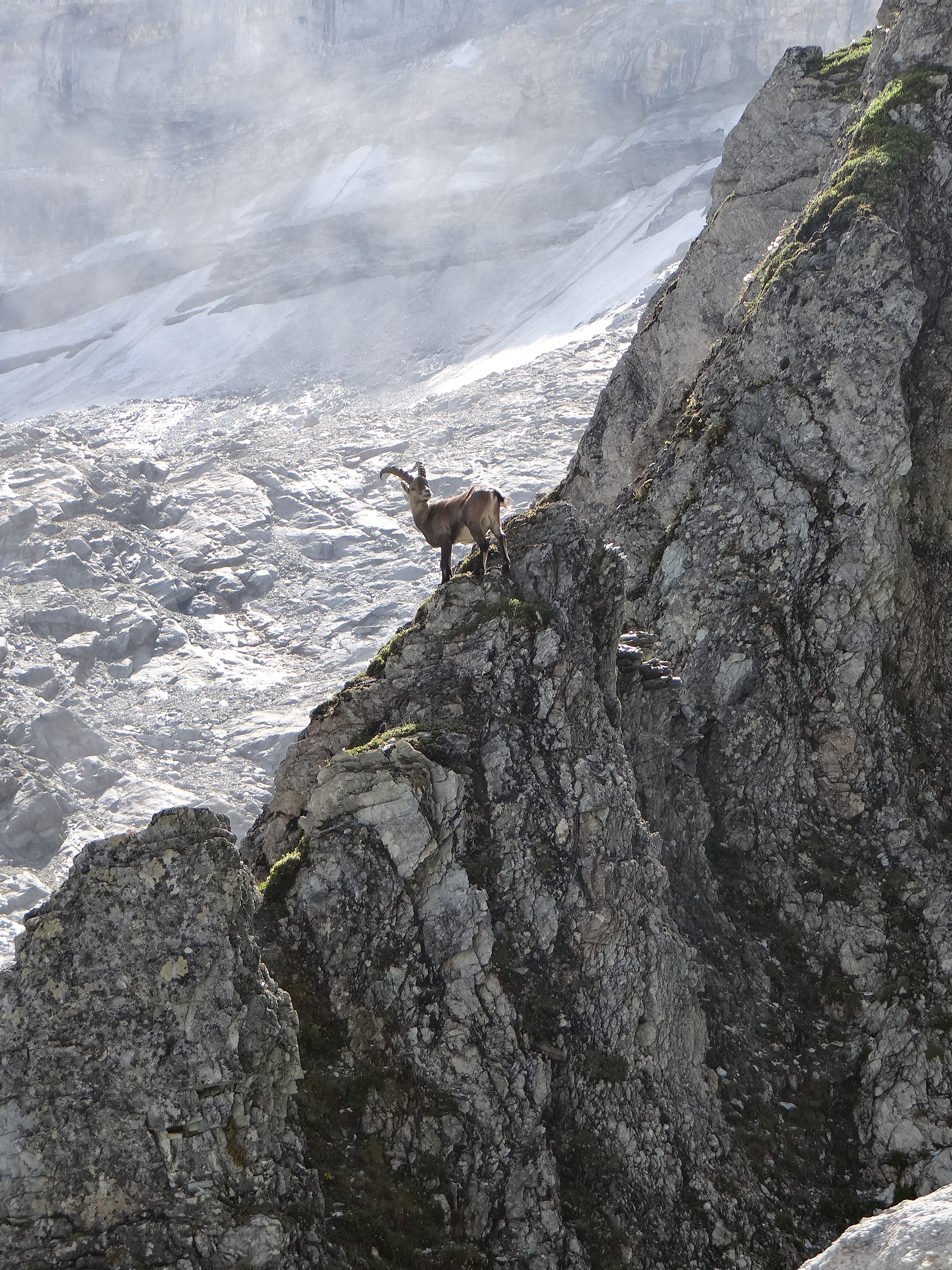
Ibex in an alpine habitat

In ecology, habitat refers to the array of resources and biotic factors that are present in an area, such as to support the survival and reproduction of a particular species. A species' habitat can be seen as the physical manifestation of its ecological niche. Thus "habitat" is a species-specific term, fundamentally different from concepts such as environment or vegetation assemblages, for which the term "habitat-type" is more appropriate.

The physical factors may include (for example): soil, moisture, range of temperature, and light intensity. Biotic factors include the availability of food and the presence or absence of predators. Every species has particular habitat requirements, habitat generalist species are able to thrive in a wide array of environmental conditions while habitat specialist species require a very limited set of factors to survive. The habitat of a species is not necessarily found in a geographical area, it can be the interior of a stem, a rotten log, a rock or a clump of moss; a parasitic organism has as its habitat the body of its host, part of the host's body (such as the digestive tract), or a single cell within the host's body.

Habitat types are environmental categorizations of different environments based on the characteristics of a given geographical area, particularly vegetation and climate. Thus habitat types do not refer to a single species but to multiple species living in the same area. For example, terrestrial habitat types include forest, steppe, grassland, semi-arid or desert. Fresh-water habitat types include marshes, streams, rivers, lakes, and ponds; marine habitat types include salt marshes, the coast, the intertidal zone, estuaries, reefs, bays, the open sea, the sea bed, deep water and submarine vents.

Habitat types may change over time. Causes of change may include a violent event (such as the eruption of a volcano, an earthquake, a tsunami, a wildfire or a change in oceanic currents); or change may occur more gradually over millennia with alterations in the climate, as ice sheets and glaciers advance and retreat, and as different weather patterns bring changes of precipitation and solar radiation. Other changes come as a direct result of human activities, such as deforestation, the plowing of ancient grasslands, the diversion and damming of rivers, the draining of marshland and the dredging of the seabed. The introduction of alien species can have a devastating effect on native wildlife – through increased predation, through competition for resources or through the introduction of pests and diseases to which the indigenous species have no immunity.

== Definition and etymology ==
The word "habitat" has been in use since about 1755 and derives from the Latin habitāre, to inhabit, from habēre, to have or to hold. Habitat can be defined as the natural environment of an organism, the type of place in which it is natural for it to live and grow. It is similar in meaning to a biotope; an area of uniform environmental conditions associated with a particular community of plants and animals.

== Environmental factors ==
The chief environmental factors affecting the distribution of living organisms are temperature, humidity, climate, soil and light intensity, and the presence or absence of all the requirements that the organism needs to sustain it. Generally speaking, animal communities are reliant on specific types of plant communities.

Some plants and animals have habitat requirements which are met in a wide range of locations. The small white butterfly Pieris rapae for example is found on all the continents of the world apart from Antarctica. Its larvae feed on a wide range of Brassicas and various other plant species, and it thrives in any open location with diverse plant communities. The large blue butterfly Phengaris arion is much more specific in its requirements; it is found only in chalk grassland areas, its larvae feed on Thymus species, and because of complex life cycle requirements it inhabits only areas in which Myrmica ants live.

Disturbance is important in the creation of biodiverse habitat types. In the absence of disturbance, a climax vegetation cover develops that prevents the establishment of other species. Wildflower meadows are sometimes created by conservationists but most of the flowering plants used are either annuals or biennials and disappear after a few years in the absence of patches of bare ground on which their seedlings can grow. Lightning strikes and toppled trees in tropical forests allow species richness to be maintained as pioneering species move in to fill the gaps created. Similarly, coastal habitat types can become dominated by kelp until the seabed is disturbed by a storm and the algae swept away, or shifting sediment exposes new areas for colonisation. Another cause of disturbance is when an area may be overwhelmed by an invasive introduced species which is not kept under control by natural enemies in its new habitat.

== Types ==
=== Terrestrial ===
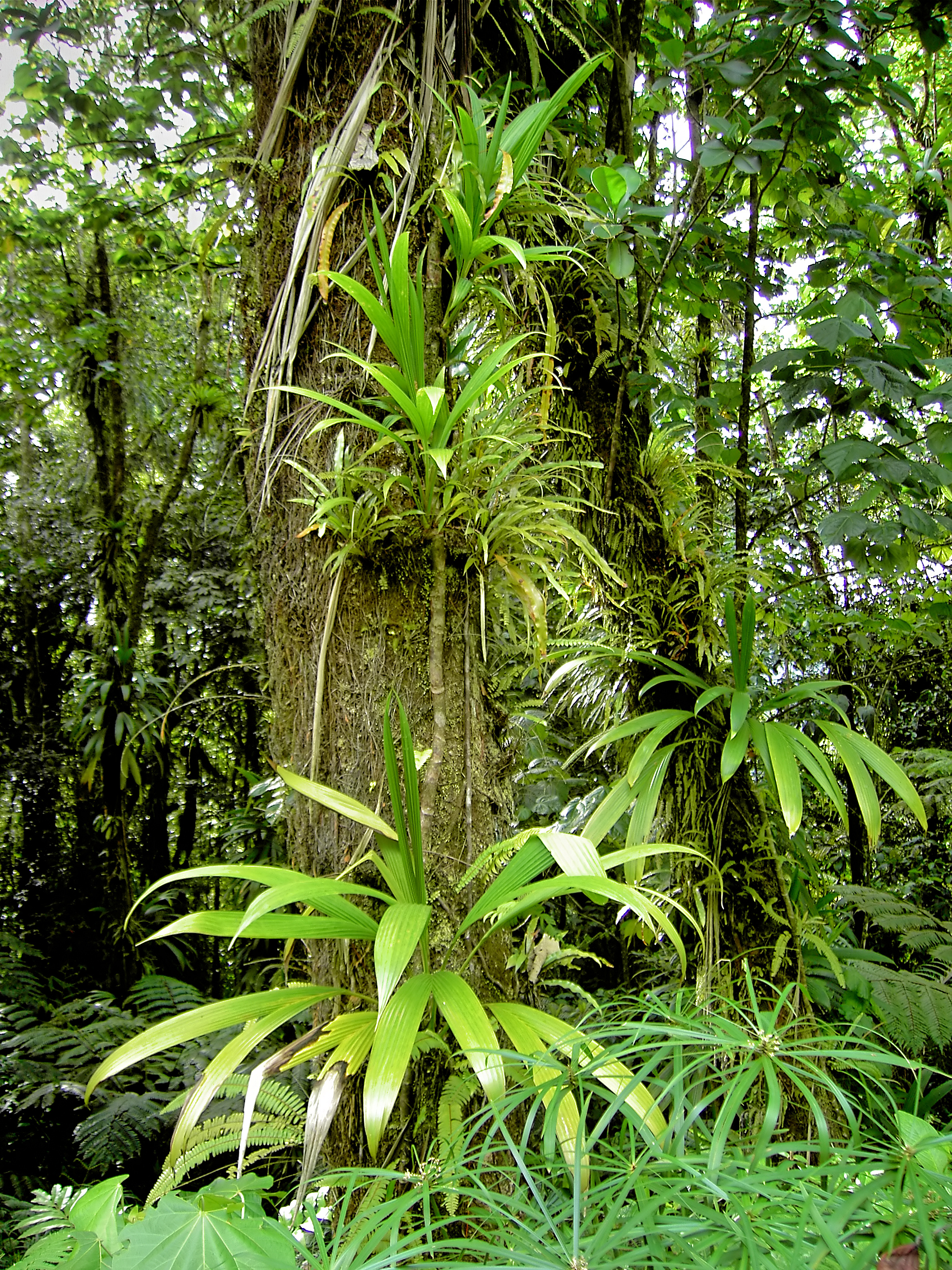
Rich rainforest habitat in Dominica

Terrestrial habitat types include forests, grasslands, wetlands and deserts. Within these broad biomes are more specific habitat types with varying climate types, temperature regimes, soils, altitudes and vegetation. Many of these habitat types grade into each other and each one has its own typical communities of plants and animals. A habitat-type may suit a particular species well, but its presence or absence at any particular location depends to some extent on chance, on its dispersal abilities and its efficiency as a colonizer.

=== Arid ===
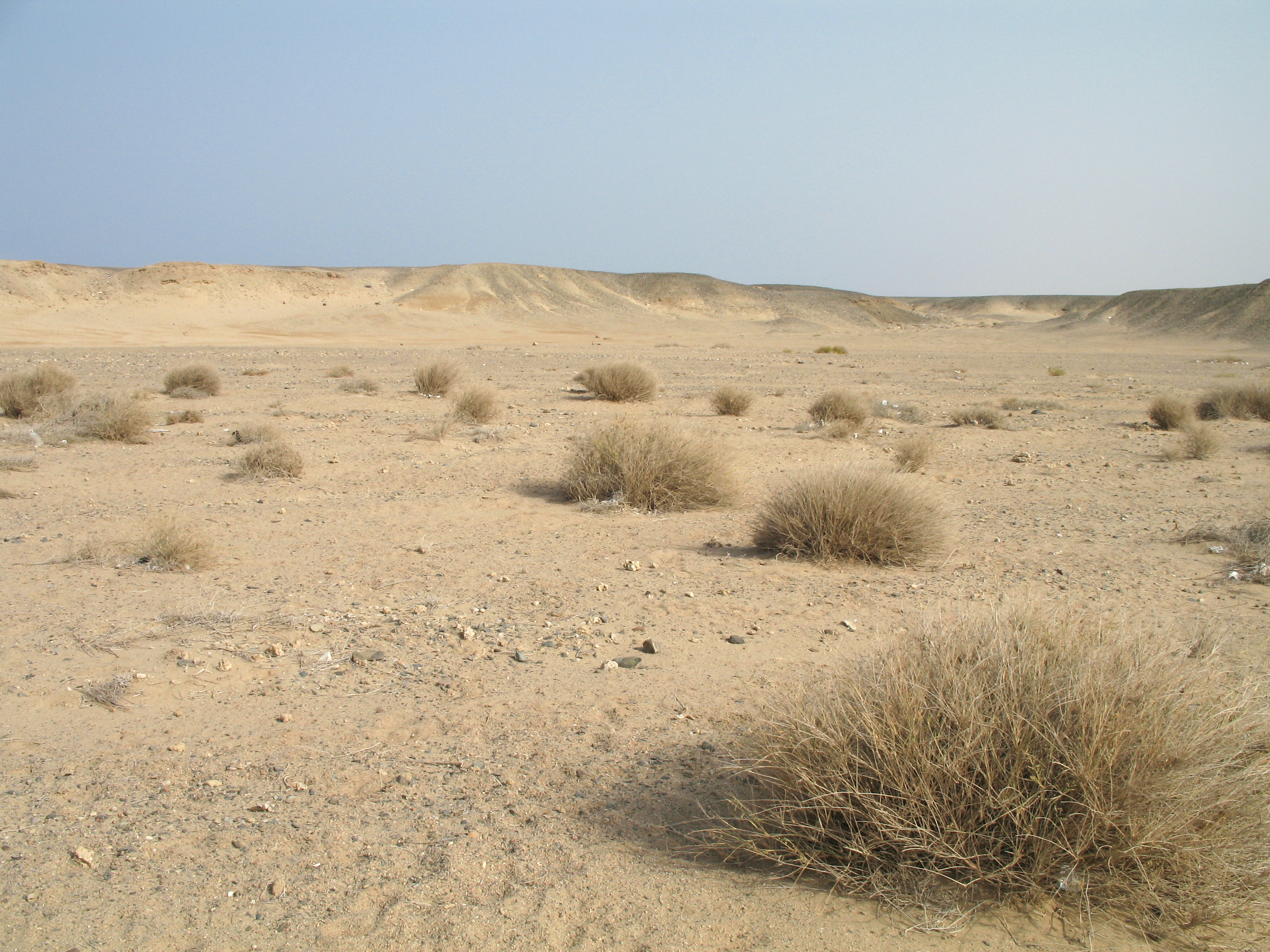
Desert scene in Egypt

Arid habitats are those where there is little available water. The most extreme arid habitats are deserts. Desert animals have a variety of adaptations to survive the dry conditions. Some frogs live in deserts, creating moist habitat types underground and hibernating while conditions are adverse. Couch's spadefoot toad (Scaphiopus couchii) emerges from its burrow when a downpour occurs and lays its eggs in the transient pools that form; the tadpoles develop with great rapidity, sometimes in as little as nine days, undergo metamorphosis, and feed voraciously before digging a burrow of their own.

==== List of arid habitat types ====
- Desert
- Fog desert
- Polar desert
- Steppe
- Savanna

=== Wetland and riparian ===
Other organisms cope with the drying up of their aqueous habitat in other ways. Vernal pools are ephemeral ponds that form in the rainy season and dry up afterwards. They have their specially-adapted characteristic flora, mainly consisting of annuals, the seeds of which survive the drought, but also some uniquely adapted perennials. Animals adapted to these extreme habitat types also exist; fairy shrimps can lay "winter eggs" which are resistant to desiccation, sometimes being blown about with the dust, ending up in new depressions in the ground. These can survive in a dormant state for as long as fifteen years. Some killifish behave in a similar way; their eggs hatch and the juvenile fish grow with great rapidity when the conditions are right, but the whole population of fish may end up as eggs in diapause in the dried up mud that was once a pond.

==== Examples of wetland and riparian habitat types ====
- Bog
- Marsh
- Fen
- Flooded grasslands and savannas
- Floodplain
- Shrub swamp
- Swamp
- Vernal pool
- Wet meadow

=== Forest ===
==== Examples of forest habitat types ====
- Boreal forest
- Cloud forest
- Peat swamp forest
- Temperate coniferous forest
- Temperate deciduous forest
- Temperate rain forest
- Thorn forest
- Tropical dry forest
- Tropical moist forest
- Tropical rain forest
- Woodland

=== Freshwater ===
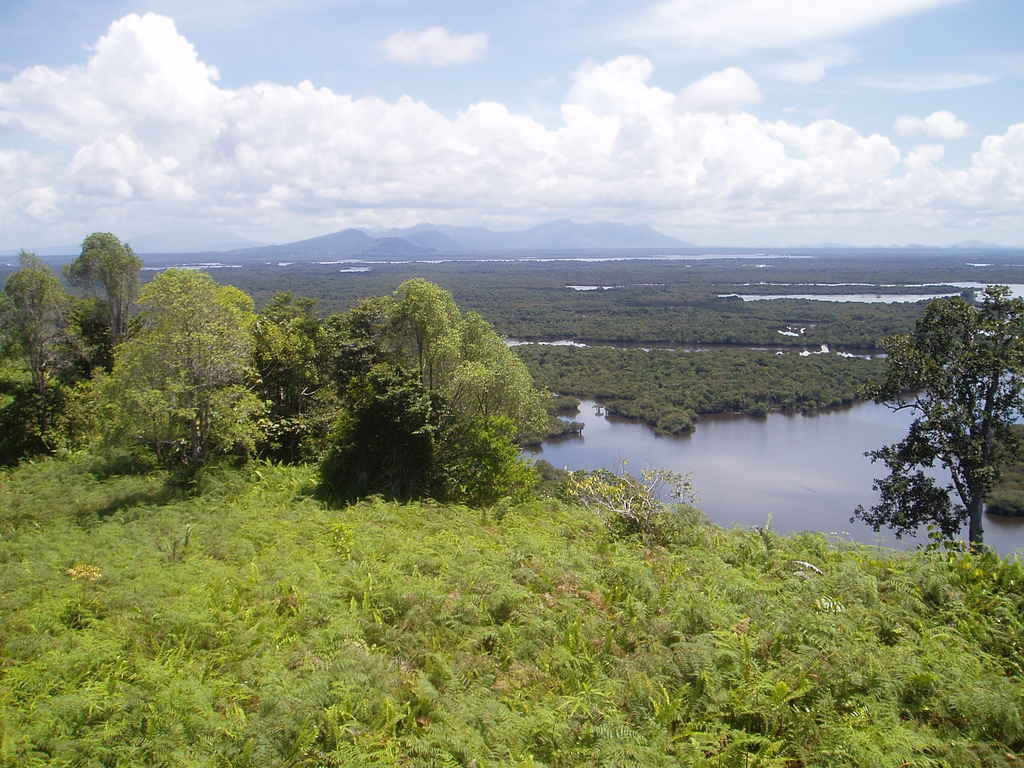
Wetland habitat types in Borneo

Freshwater habitat types include rivers, streams, lakes, ponds, marshes and bogs. They can be divided into running waters (rivers, streams) and standing waters (lakes, ponds, marshes, bogs). Although some organisms are found across most of these habitat types, the majority have more specific requirements. The water velocity, its temperature and oxygen saturation are important factors, but in river systems, there are fast and slow sections, pools, bayous and backwaters which provide a range of habitat types. Similarly, aquatic plants can be floating, semi-submerged, submerged or grow in permanently or temporarily saturated soils besides bodies of water. Marginal plants provide important habitat for both invertebrates and vertebrates, and submerged plants provide oxygenation of the water, absorb nutrients and play a part in the reduction of pollution.

=== Marine ===
Marine habitats include brackish water, estuaries, bays, the open sea, the intertidal zone, the seabed, reefs and deep / shallow water zones. Further variations include rock pools, sand banks, mudflats, brackish lagoons, sandy and pebbly beaches, and seagrass beds, all supporting their own flora and fauna. The benthic zone or seabed provides a home for both static organisms, anchored to the substrate, and for a large range of organisms crawling on or burrowing into the surface. Some creatures float among the waves on the surface of the water, or raft on floating debris; others swim at a range of depths, including organisms in the demersal zone close to the seabed, and myriads of organisms drift with the currents and form the plankton.

==== List of marine habitat types ====
- Abyssal plain
- Aphotic zone
- Benthic zone
- Cold seep
- Coral reef
- Demersal zone
- Estuary
- Hydrothermal vent
- Intertidal zone
- Kelp forest
- Littoral zone
- Oceanic trench
- Photic zone
- Seagrass meadow
- Mangrove swamp
- Seamount
- Tide pool

=== Urban ===
Many animals and plants have taken up residence in urban environments. They tend to be adaptable generalists and use the town's features to make their homes. Rats and mice have followed man around the globe, pigeons, peregrines, sparrows, swallows and house martins use the buildings for nesting, bats use roof space for roosting, foxes visit the garbage bins and squirrels, coyotes, raccoons and skunks roam the streets. About 2,000 coyotes are thought to live in and around Chicago. A survey of dwelling houses in northern European cities in the twentieth century found about 175 species of invertebrate inside them, including 53 species of beetle, 21 flies, 13 butterflies and moths, 13 mites, 9 lice, 7 bees, 5 wasps, 5 cockroaches, 5 spiders, 4 ants and a number of other groups. In warmer climates, termites are serious pests in the urban habitat; 183 species are known to affect buildings and 83 species cause serious structural damage.

== Microhabitat types ==
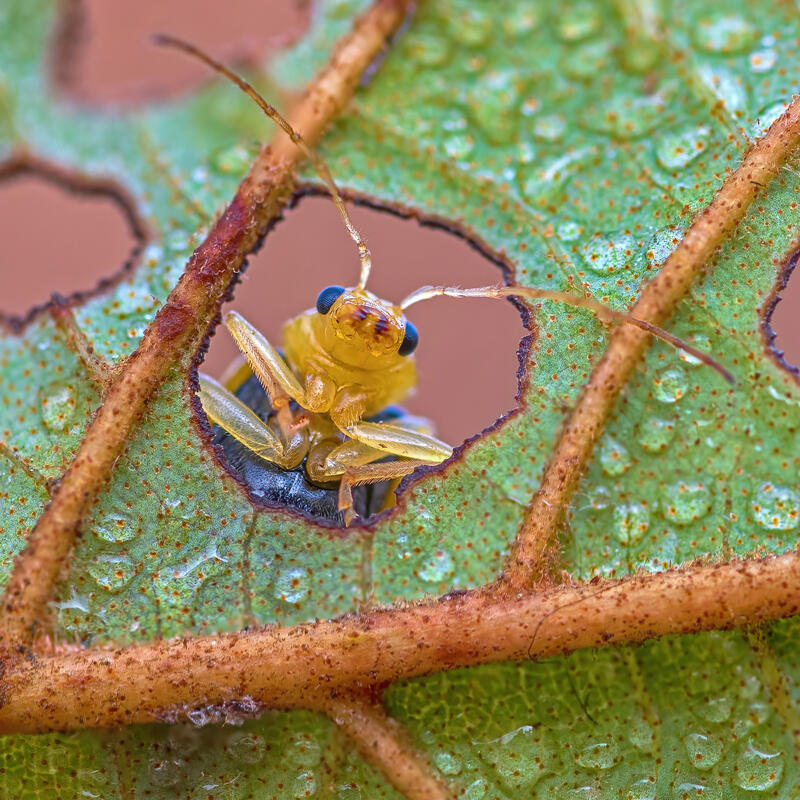
The leaves of an Alnus nepalensis tree provide a microhabitat for species like the leaf beetle Aulacophora indica.

A microhabitat consists of the small-scale physical requirements of a particular organism or population. Every habitat includes large numbers of microhabitat types with subtly different exposure to light, humidity, temperature, air movement, and other factors. The lichens that grow on the north face of a boulder are different from those that grow on the south face, from those on the level top, and those that grow on the ground nearby; the lichens growing in the grooves and on the raised surfaces are different from those growing on the veins of quartz. Lurking among these miniature "forests" are the microfauna, species of invertebrate, each with its own specific habitat requirements.

There are numerous different microhabitat types in a wood; coniferous forest, broad-leafed forest, open woodland, scattered trees, woodland verges, clearings, and glades; tree trunk, branch, twig, bud, leaf, flower, and fruit; rough bark, smooth bark, damaged bark, rotten wood, hollow, groove, and hole; canopy, shrub layer, plant layer, leaf litter, and soil; buttress root, stump, fallen log, stem base, grass tussock, fungus, fern, and moss. The greater the structural diversity in the wood, the greater the number of microhabitat types that will be present. A range of tree species with individual specimens of varying sizes and ages, and a range of features such as streams, level areas, slopes, tracks, clearings, and felled areas will provide suitable conditions for an enormous number of biodiverse plants and animals. For example, in Britain it has been estimated that various types of rotting wood are home to over 1700 species of invertebrate.

For a parasitic organism, its habitat is the particular part of the outside or inside of its host on or in which it is adapted to live. The life cycle of some parasites involves several different host species, as well as free-living life stages, sometimes within vastly different microhabitat types. One such organism is the trematode (flatworm) Microphallus turgidus, present in brackish water marshes in the southeastern United States. Its first intermediate host is a snail and the second, a glass shrimp. The final host is the waterfowl or mammal that consumes the shrimp.

== Extreme habitat types ==
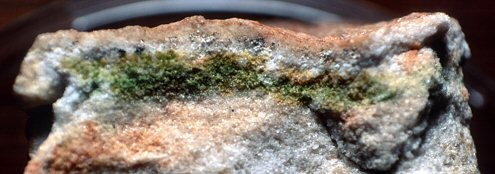
An Antarctic rock split apart to show endolithic lifeforms showing as a green layer a few millimeters thick

Although the vast majority of life on Earth lives in mesophyllic (moderate) environments, a few organisms, most of them microbes, have managed to colonise extreme environments that are unsuitable for more complex life forms. There are bacteria, for example, living in Lake Whillans, half a mile below the ice of Antarctica; in the absence of sunlight, they must rely on organic material from elsewhere, perhaps decaying matter from glacier melt water or minerals from the underlying rock. Other bacteria can be found in abundance in the Mariana Trench, the deepest place in the ocean and on Earth; marine snow drifts down from the surface layers of the sea and accumulates in this undersea valley, providing nourishment for an extensive community of bacteria.

Other microbes live in environments lacking in oxygen, and are dependent on chemical reactions other than photosynthesis. Boreholes drilled 300 m (1,000 ft) into the rocky seabed have found microbial communities apparently based on the products of reactions between water and the constituents of rocks. These communities have not been studied much, but may be an important part of the global carbon cycle. Rock in mines two miles deep also harbour microbes; these live on minute traces of hydrogen produced in slow oxidizing reactions inside the rock. These metabolic reactions allow life to exist in places with no oxygen or light, an environment that had previously been thought to be devoid of life.

The intertidal zone and the photic zone in the oceans are relatively familiar habitat types. However the vast bulk of the ocean is inhospitable to air-breathing humans, with scuba divers limited to the upper 50 m (160 ft) or so. The lower limit for photosynthesis is 100 to 200 m (330 to 660 ft) and below that depth the prevailing conditions include total darkness, high pressure, little oxygen (in some places), scarce food resources and extreme cold. This habitat is very challenging to research, and as well as being little-studied, it is vast, with 79% of the Earth's biosphere being at depths greater than 1,000 m (3,300 ft). With no plant life, the animals in this zone are either detritivores, reliant on food drifting down from surface layers, or they are predators, feeding on each other. Some organisms are pelagic, swimming or drifting in mid-ocean, while others are benthic, living on or near the seabed. Their growth rates and metabolisms tend to be slow, their eyes may be very large to detect what little illumination there is, or they may be blind and rely on other sensory inputs. A number of deep sea creatures are bioluminescent; this serves a variety of functions including predation, protection and social recognition. In general, the bodies of animals living at great depths are adapted to high pressure environments by having pressure-resistant biomolecules and small organic molecules present in their cells known as piezolytes, which give the proteins the flexibility they need. There are also unsaturated fats in their membranes which prevent them from solidifying at low temperatures.

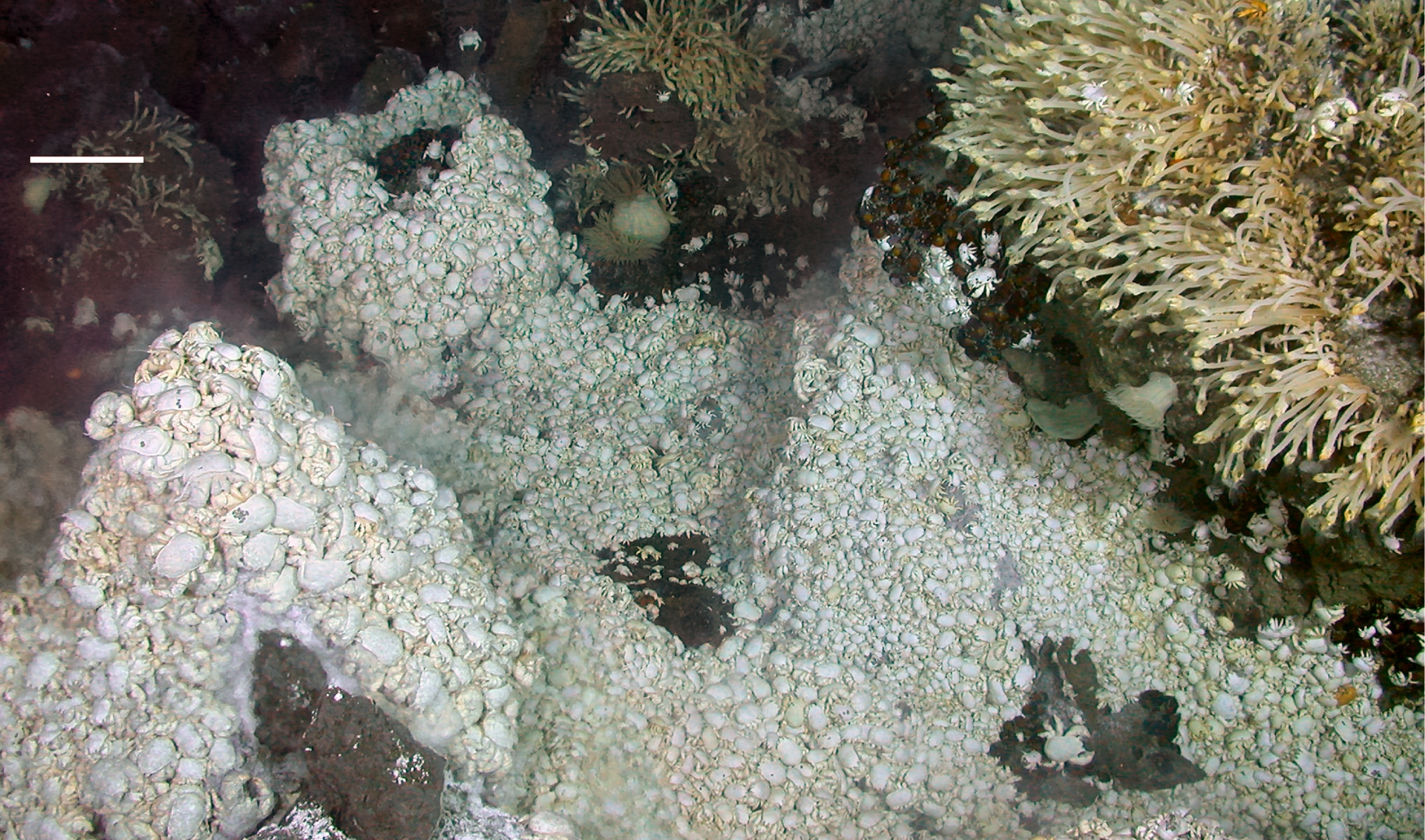
Dense mass of white crabs at a hydrothermal vent, with stalked barnacles on right

Hydrothermal vents were first discovered in the ocean depths in 1977. They result from seawater becoming heated after seeping through cracks to places where hot magma is close to the seabed. The under-water hot springs may gush forth at temperatures of over 340 °C (640 °F) and support unique communities of organisms in their immediate vicinity. The basis for this teeming life is chemosynthesis, a process by which microbes convert such substances as hydrogen sulfide or ammonia into organic molecules. These bacteria and Archaea are the primary producers in these ecosystems and support a diverse array of life. About 350 species of organism, dominated by molluscs, polychaete worms and crustaceans, had been discovered around hydrothermal vents by the end of the twentieth century, most of them being new to science and endemic to these habitat types.

Besides providing locomotion opportunities for winged animals and a conduit for the dispersal of pollen grains, spores and seeds, the atmosphere can be considered to be a habitat-type in its own right. There are metabolically active microbes present that actively reproduce and spend their whole existence airborne, with hundreds of thousands of individual organisms estimated to be present in a cubic meter of air. The airborne microbial community may be as diverse as that found in soil or other terrestrial environments, however, these organisms are not evenly distributed, their densities varying spatially with altitude and environmental conditions. Aerobiology has not been studied much, but there is evidence of nitrogen fixation in clouds, and less clear evidence of carbon cycling, both facilitated by microbial activity.

There are other examples of extreme habitat types where specially adapted lifeforms exist; tar pits teeming with microbial life; naturally occurring crude oil pools inhabited by the larvae of the petroleum fly; hot springs where the temperature may be as high as 71 °C (160 °F) and cyanobacteria create microbial mats; cold seeps where the methane and hydrogen sulfide issue from the ocean floor and support microbes and higher animals such as mussels which form symbiotic associations with these anaerobic organisms; salt pans that harbour salt-tolerant bacteria, archaea and also fungi such as the black yeast Hortaea werneckii and basidiomycete Wallemia ichthyophaga; ice sheets in Antarctica which support fungi Thelebolus spp., glacial ice with a variety of bacteria and fungi; and snowfields on which algae grow.

== Habitat change ==
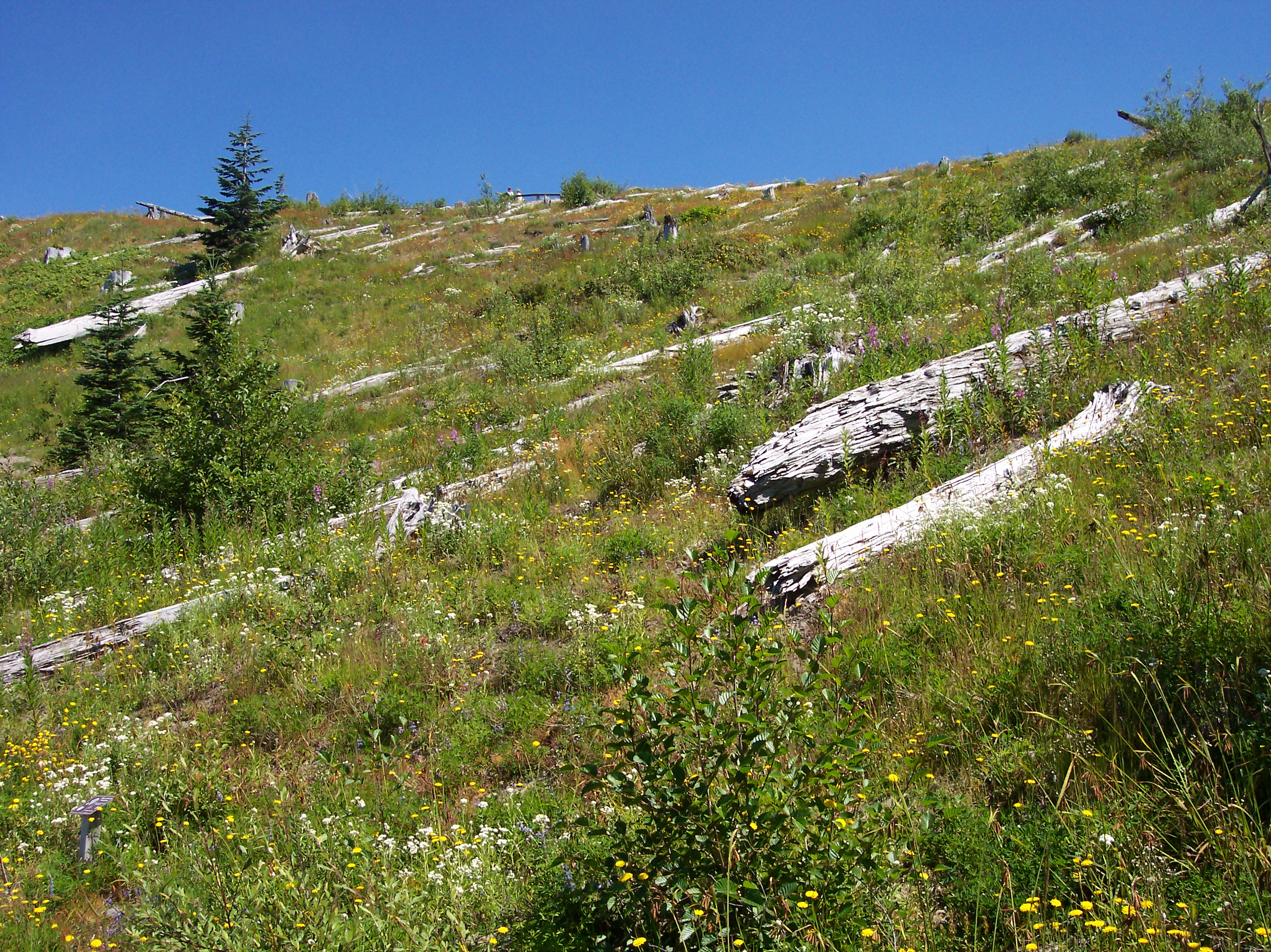
Twenty-five years after the devastating eruption at Mount St. Helens, United States, pioneer species have moved in.

Whether from natural processes or the activities of man, landscapes and their associated habitat types change over time. There are the slow geomorphological changes associated with the geologic processes that cause tectonic uplift and subsidence, and the more rapid changes associated with earthquakes, landslides, storms, flooding, wildfires, coastal erosion, deforestation and changes in land use. Then there are the changes in habitat types brought on by alterations in farming practices, tourism, pollution, fragmentation and climate change.

Loss of habitat is the single greatest threat to any species. If an island on which an endemic organism lives becomes uninhabitable for some reason, the species will become extinct. Any type of habitat surrounded by a different habitat is in a similar situation to an island. If a forest is divided into parts by logging, with strips of cleared land separating woodland blocks, and the distances between the remaining fragments exceed the distance an individual animal is able to travel, that species becomes especially vulnerable. Small populations generally lack genetic diversity and may be threatened by increased predation, increased competition, disease and unexpected catastrophe. At the edge of each forest fragment, increased light encourages secondary growth of fast-growing species and old growth trees are more vulnerable to logging as access is improved. The birds that nest in their crevices, the epiphytes that hang from their branches and the invertebrates in the leaf litter are all adversely affected and biodiversity is reduced. Habitat fragmentation can be ameliorated to some extent by the provision of wildlife corridors connecting the fragments. These can be a river, ditch, strip of trees, hedgerow or even an underpass to a highway. Without the corridors, seeds cannot disperse and animals, especially small ones, cannot travel through the hostile territory, putting populations at greater risk of local extinction.

Habitat disturbance can have long-lasting effects on the environment. Bromus tectorum is a vigorous grass from Europe which has been introduced to the United States where it has become invasive. It is highly adapted to fire, producing large amounts of flammable detritus and increasing the frequency and intensity of wildfires. In areas where it has become established, it has altered the local fire regimen to such an extant that native plants cannot survive the frequent fires, allowing it to become even more dominant. A marine example is when sea urchin populations "explode" in coastal waters and destroy all the macroalgae present. What was previously a kelp forest becomes an urchin barren that may last for years and this can have a profound effect on the food chain. Removal of the sea urchins, by disease for example, can result in the seaweed returning, with an over-abundance of fast-growing kelp.

=== Fragmentation ===
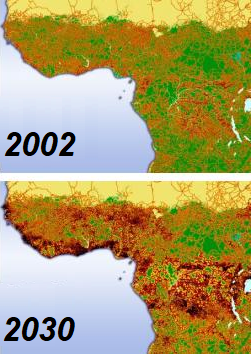
Predicted fragmentation and destruction of Great Ape habitat in Central Africa, from the GLOBIO and GRASP projects in 2002. Areas shown in black and red delineate areas of severe and moderate habitat loss, respectively.

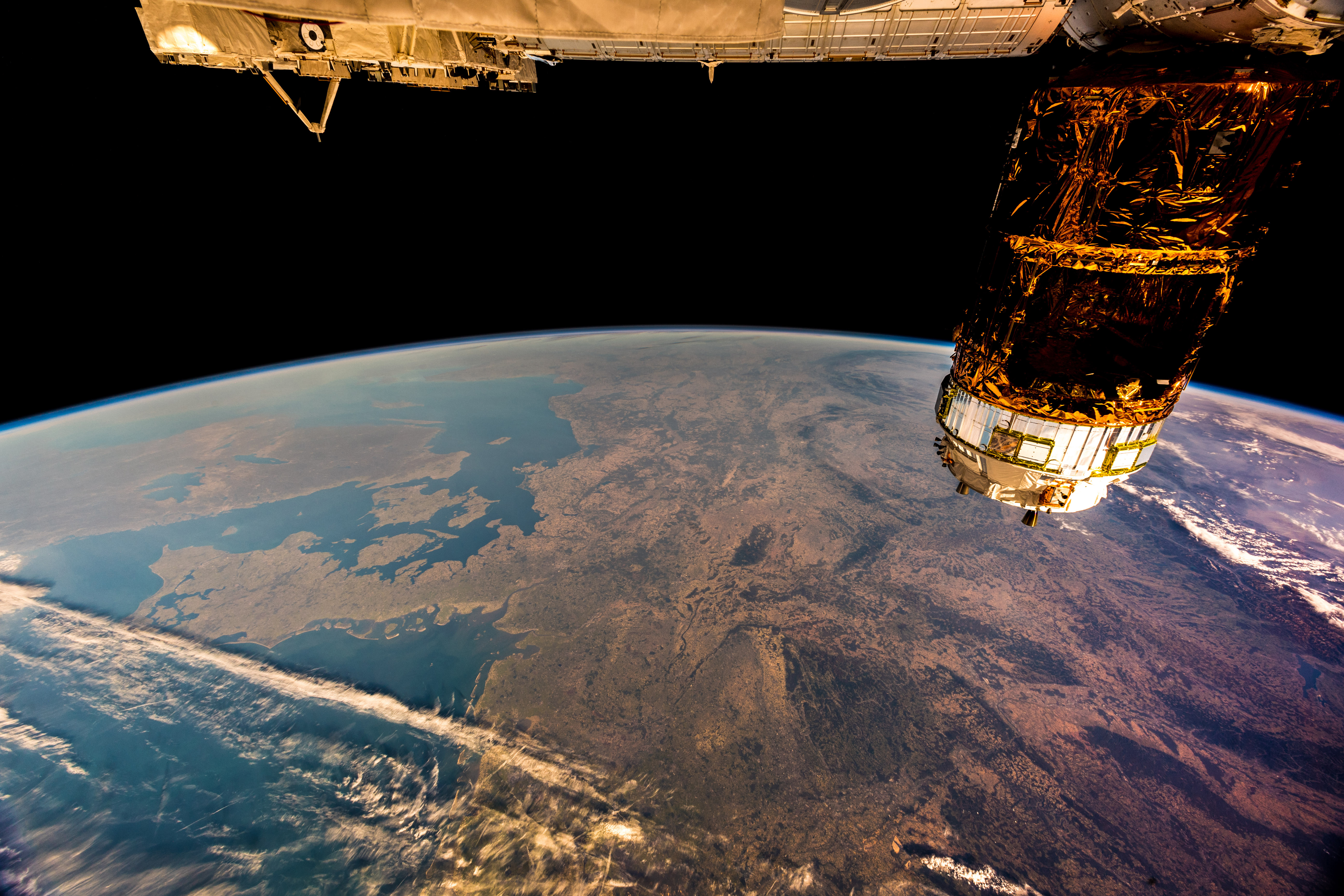
Deforestation in Europe. France is the most deforested country in Europe, with only 15% of the native vegetation remaining.

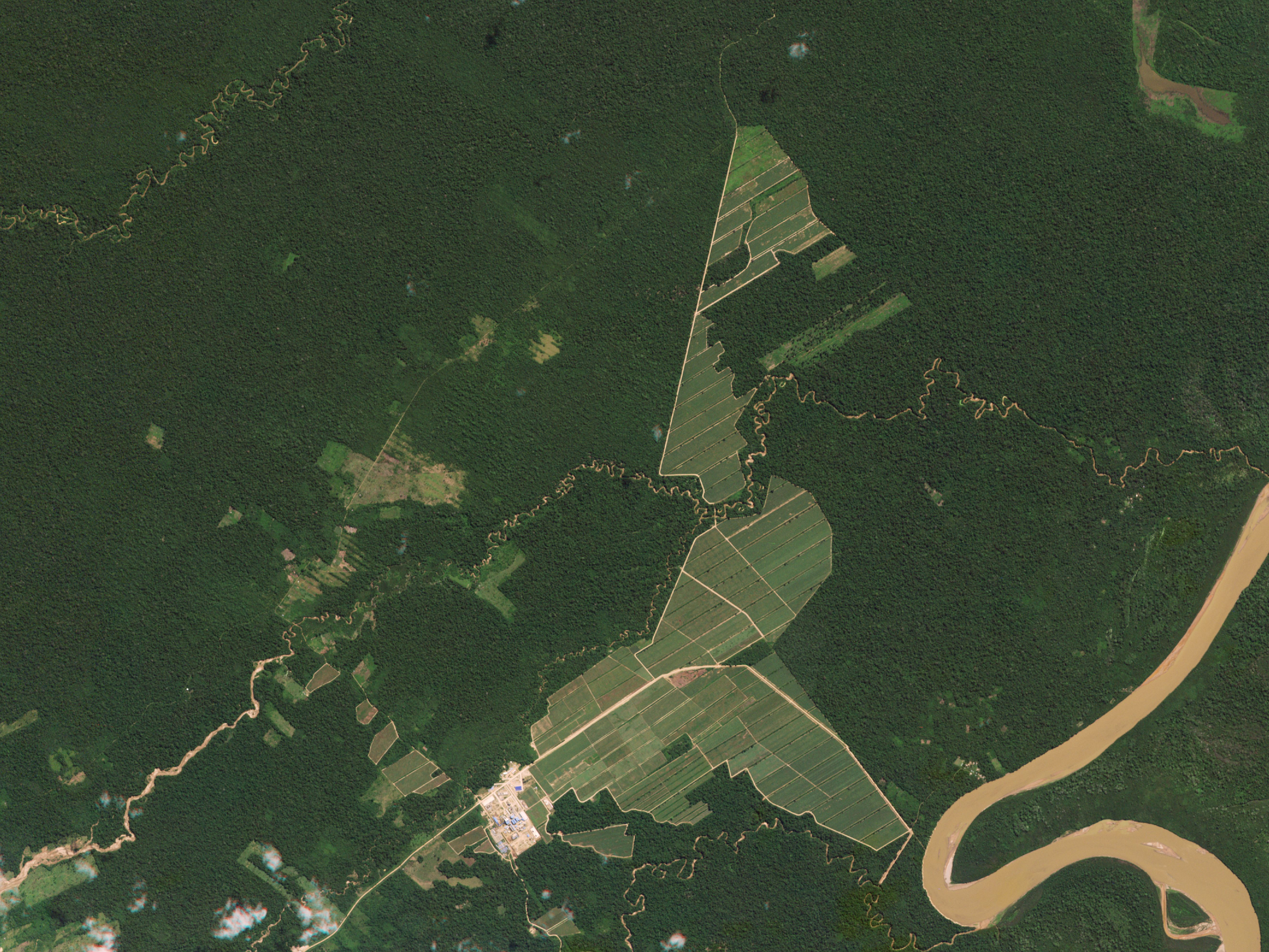
Deforestation in Bolivia, 2016.

Habitat fragmentation is the emergence of discontinuities (fragmentation) in an organism's preferred environment (habitat), causing population fragmentation and ecosystem decay. Causes of habitat fragmentation include geological processes that slowly alter the layout of the physical environment (suspected of being one of the major causes of speciation), and human activity such as land conversion, which can alter the environment much faster and causes the population fluctuation of many species. More specifically, habitat fragmentation is a process by which large and contiguous habitats get divided into smaller, isolated patches of habitats.

=== Destruction ===
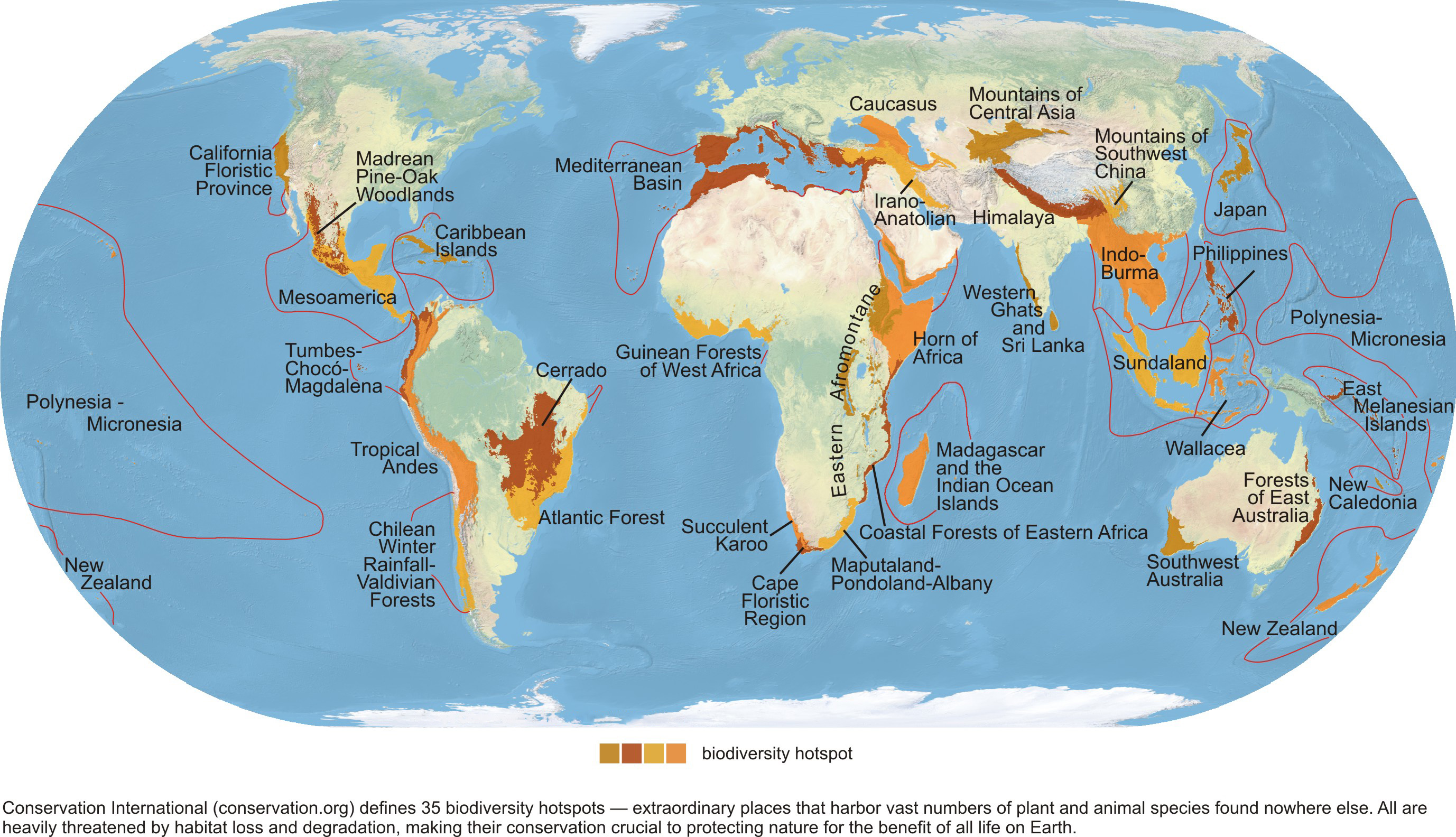
Map of the world's biodiversity hot spots, all of which are heavily threatened by habitat loss and degradation

Habitat destruction (also termed habitat loss) occurs when a natural habitat is no longer able to support its native species. The organisms once living there have either moved elsewhere, or are dead, leading to a decrease in biodiversity and species numbers. Habitat destruction is in fact the leading cause of biodiversity loss and species extinction worldwide.

Humans contribute to habitat destruction through the use of natural resources, agriculture, industrial production and urbanization (urban sprawl). Other activities include mining, logging, and trawling. Environmental factors can contribute to habitat destruction more indirectly. Geological processes, climate change, introduction of invasive species, ecosystem nutrient depletion, water and noise pollution are some of the examples. Loss of habitat can be preceded by an initial habitat fragmentation. Fragmentation and loss of habitat have become one of the most important topics of research in ecology as they are major threats to the survival of endangered species.

== Habitat protection ==
The protection of habitat types is a necessary step in the maintenance of biodiversity because if habitat destruction occurs, the animals and plants reliant on that habitat suffer. Many countries have enacted legislation to protect their wildlife. This may take the form of the setting up of national parks, forest reserves and wildlife reserves, or it may restrict the activities of humans with the objective of benefiting wildlife. The laws may be designed to protect a particular species or group of species, or the legislation may prohibit such activities as the collecting of bird eggs, the hunting of animals or the removal of plants. A general law on the protection of habitat types may be more difficult to implement than a site specific requirement. A concept introduced in the United States in 1973 involves protecting the critical habitat of endangered species, and a similar concept has been incorporated into some Australian legislation.

International treaties may be necessary for such objectives as the setting up of marine reserves. Another international agreement, the Convention on the Conservation of Migratory Species of Wild Animals, protects animals that migrate across the globe and need protection in more than one country. Even where legislation protects the environment, a lack of enforcement often prevents effective protection. However, the protection of habitat types needs to take into account the needs of the local residents for food, fuel and other resources. Faced with hunger and destitution, a farmer is likely to plough up a level patch of ground despite it being the last suitable habitat for an endangered species such as the San Quintin kangaroo rat, and even kill the animal as a pest. In the interests of ecotourism it is desirable that local communities are educated on the uniqueness of their flora and fauna.

== Monotypic habitat ==
A monotypic habitat type is a concept sometimes used in conservation biology, in which a single species of animal or plant is the only species of its type to be found in a specific habitat and forms a monoculture. Even though it might seem such a habitat type is impoverished in biodiversity as compared with polytypic habitat types, this is not necessarily the case. Monocultures of the exotic plant Hydrilla support a similarly rich fauna of invertebrates as a more varied habitat. The monotypic habitat occurs in both botanical and zoological contexts. Some invasive species may create monocultural stands that prevent other species from growing there. A dominant colonization can occur from retardant chemicals exuded, nutrient monopolization, or from lack of natural controls, such as herbivores or climate, that keep them in balance with their native habitat types. The yellow starthistle, Centaurea solstitialis is a botanical monotypic habitat example of this, currently dominating over 15,000,000 acres (61,000 km^{2}) in California alone. The non-native freshwater zebra mussel, Dreissena polymorpha, that colonizes areas of the Great Lakes and the Mississippi River watershed, is a zoological monotypic habitat example; the predators or parasites that control it in its home-range in Russia are absent.

== See also ==
- Altitudinal zonation – Natural layering of ecosystems by elevation
- Ecological niche – Concept in ecology
- Habitat conservation – Management practice for protecting types of environments
- Habitat destruction – Process by which a natural habitat becomes incapable of supporting its native species: the loss of habitat
- Habitat fragmentation – Discontinuities in an organism's environment causing population fragmentation
- Landscape ecology – Relationships between ecological processes in the environment and particular ecosystems
- List of life zones by region – Overview of life zones
