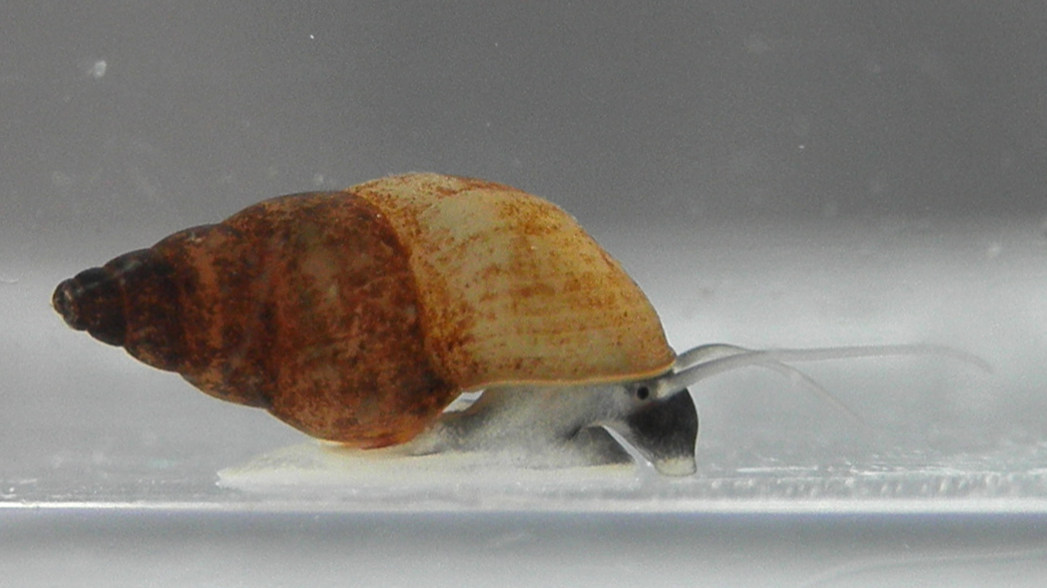
- right side view of Potamopyrgus antipodarum
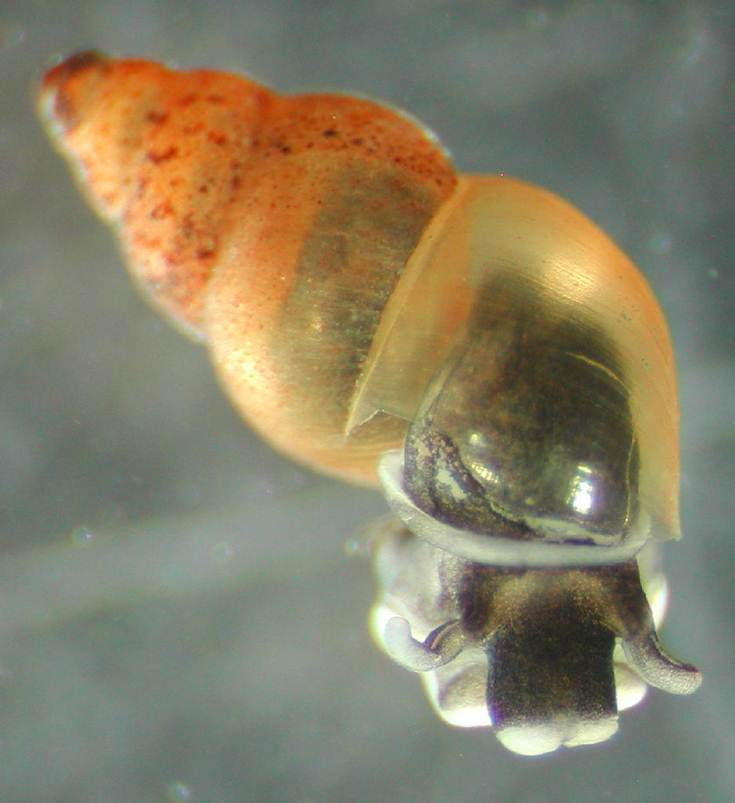

Conservation status
- Least Concern (IUCN 3.1)

- Secure (NatureServe)

Scientific classification
- Kingdom: Animalia
- Phylum: Mollusca
- Class: Gastropoda
- Subclass: Caenogastropoda
- Order: Littorinimorpha
- Family: Tateidae
- Genus: Potamopyrgus
- Species: P. antipodarum

Binomial name
- Potamopyrgus antipodarum (J. E. Gray, 1843)

Synonyms
- Amnicola antipodanum J.E. Gray, 1843; Amnicola antipodarum J. E. Gray, 1843; Amnicola badia A. Gould, 1848; Amnicola corolla A. Gould, 1847; Amnicola egena A. Gould, 1848; Amnicola gracilis A. Gould, 1844; Amnicola zelandiae J. E. Gray, 1843; Bithinia legrandi Tenison Woods, 1876; Bithinia tasmanica Tenison Woods, 1876; Bithinia unicarinata Tenison Woods, 1876; Bythinella exigua Tenison Woods, 1879; Bythinella pattisoni Cotton, 1942; Hydrobia antipodum [sic] misspelling; Hydrobia fischeri Dunker, 1862; Hydrobia jenkinsi E. A. Smith, 1889; Hydrobia jenkinsi var. aculeata Overton, 1905; Hydrobia reevei Frauenfeld, 1863; Hydrobia spalaea Frauenfeld, 1863; Hydrobia ventrosa var. carinata J.T. Marshall, 1889; Melania corolla A. Gould, 1847; Paludestrina cumingiana P. Fischer, 1860; Paludestrina jenkinsi (E. A. Smith, 1889); Paludestrina legrandiana Brazier, 1872; Paludestrina salleana P.Fischer, 1860; Paludestrina wisemaniana Brazier, 1872; Potamopyrgus alexenkoae V. Anistratenko, 1995; Potamopyrgus badia A. Gould, 1848; Potamopyrgus corolla A. Gould, 1847; Potamopyrgus jenkinsi (E. A. Smith, 1889); Potamopyrgus jenkinsi septentrionalis C.R. Boettger, 1951; Potamopyrgus jenkinsi var. aculeata Overton, 1905; Potamopyrgus polistchuki V. Anistratenko, 1991; Potamopyrgus weltneri C.R. Boettger, 1951; Pyrgula (Trachycaspia) grossui Golikov & Starobogatov, 1966; Rissoa castanea G.B. Sowerby II, 1859; Rissoa vana Hutton, 1873; Rissoina fuscozona Suter, 1908; Rissoina vana (Hutton, 1873)

= New Zealand mud snail =

New Zealand mudsnail

Species of gastropod

The New Zealand mud snail (Potamopyrgus antipodarum) is a species of very small freshwater snail with a gill and an operculum. This aquatic gastropod mollusk is in the family Tateidae.

It is native to New Zealand, where it is found throughout the country. However, it has been introduced to many other countries. It is often considered an invasive species because populations of the snail can reach very high densities.

== Shell description ==
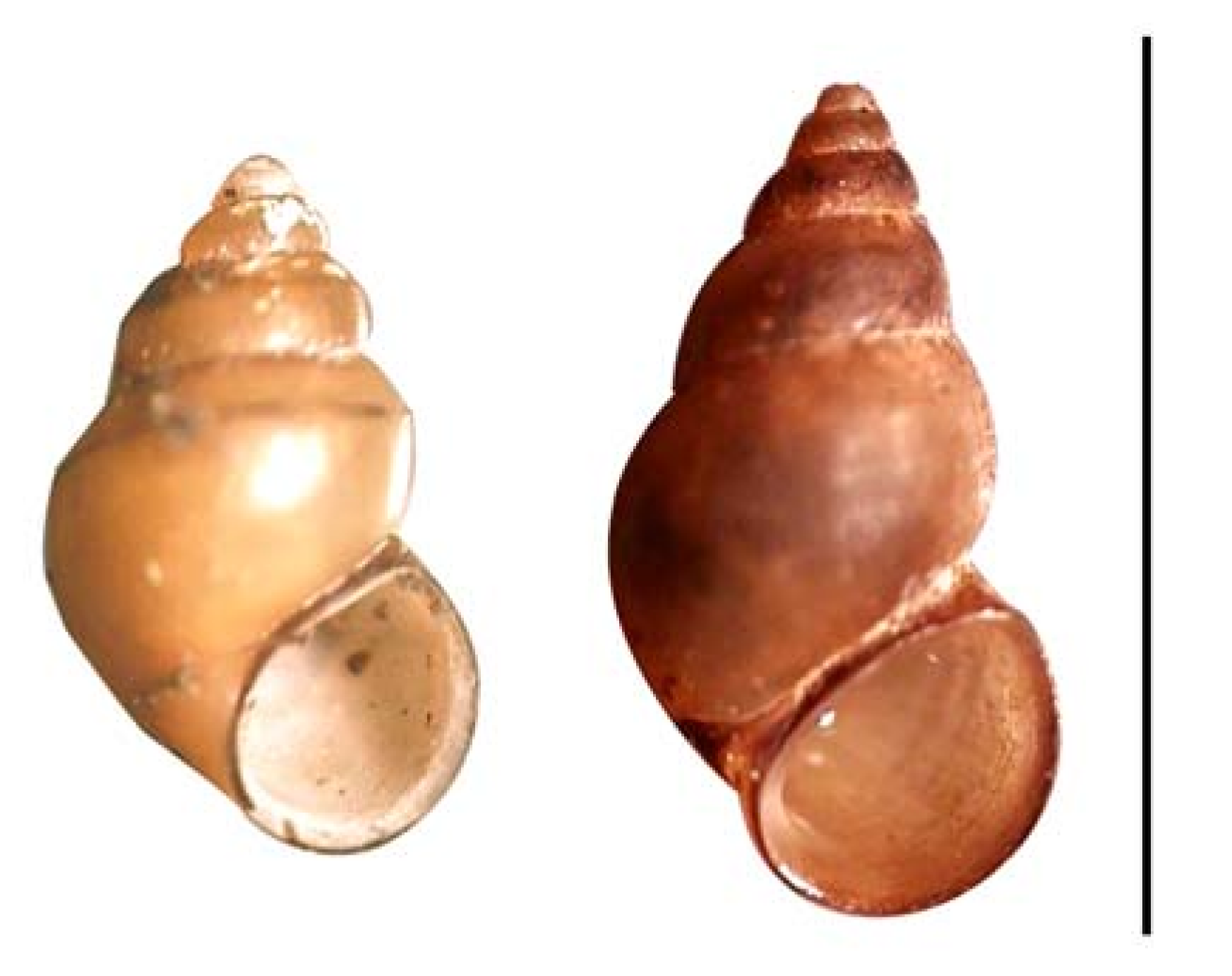
Shells of Potamopyrgus antipodarum f. carinata (left) and Potamopyrgus antipodarum (right). Scale bar is 0.5 cm.

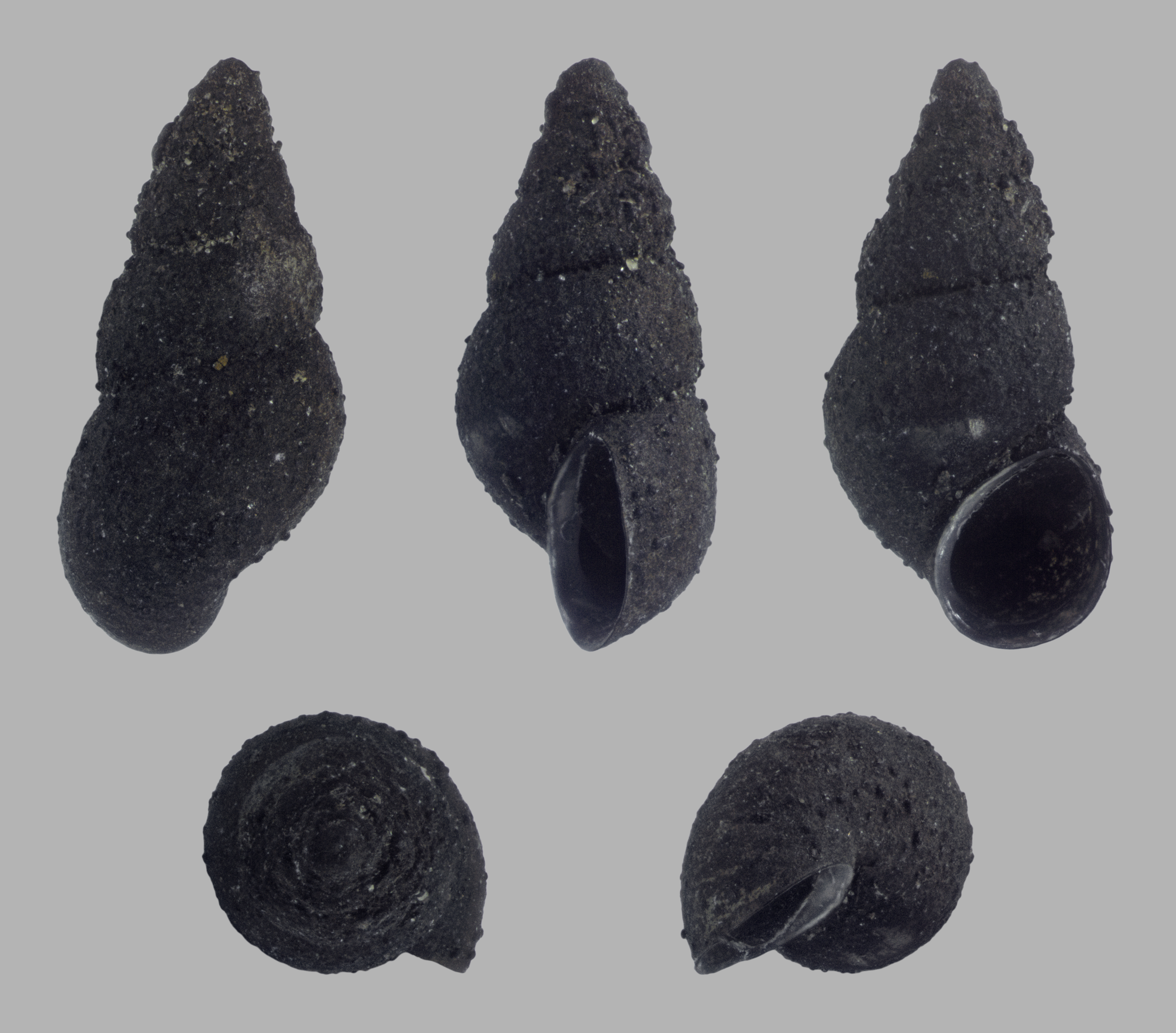
Shell with the typical black earthy coat

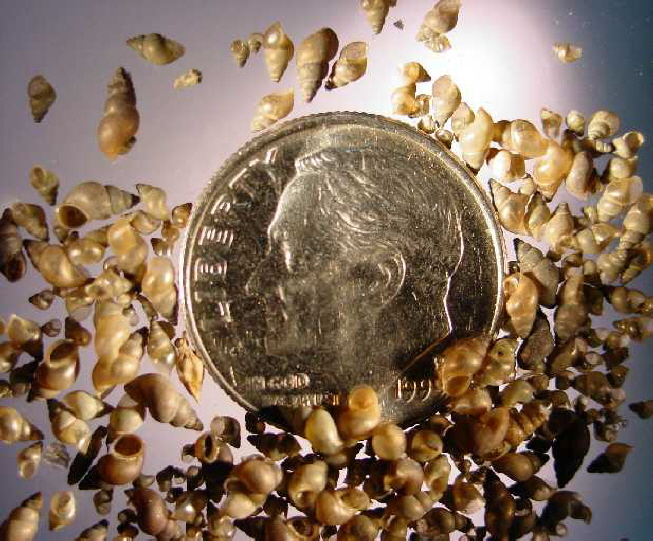
A group of mudsnails of all growth sizes from juvenile to adults, compared to an American 10 cent coin, which is 18 mm in diameter.

The shell of Potamopyrgus antipodarum is elongated and has dextral coiling, with 7 to 8 whorls. Between whorls are deep grooves. Shell colors vary from gray and dark brown to light brown. The average height of the shell is approximately 5 mm (
$$\begin{matrix} \frac{1}{5} \end{matrix}$$
in); maximum size is approximately 12 mm (
$$\begin{matrix} \frac{1}{2} \end{matrix}$$
in). The snail is usually 4–6 mm in length in the Great Lakes, but grows to 12 mm in its native range. It is an operculate snail, with a 'lid' that can seal the opening of its shell. The operculum is thin and corneus with an off-centre nucleus from which paucispiral markings (with few coils) radiate. The aperture is oval and its height is less than the height of the spire. Some morphs, including many from the Great Lakes, exhibit a keel in the middle of each whorl; others, excluding those from the Great Lakes, exhibit periostracal ornamentation such as spines for anti–predator defense.

== Taxonomy ==
This species was originally described as Amnicola antipodarum in 1843 by John Edward Gray:

Inhabits New Zealand, in fresh water. Shell ovate, acute, subperforated (generally covered with a black earthy coat); whorls rather rounded, mouth ovate, axis 3 lines; operculum horny and subspiral: variety, spire rather longer, whorls more rounded. This species is like Paludina nigra of Quoy and Gaimard, but the operculum is more spiral. Quoy described the operculum as concentric, but figured it subspiral. Paludina ventricosa of Quoy is evidently a Nematura.

== Forms ==
- Potamopyrgus antipodarum f. carinata (J. T. Marshall, 1889)

== Distribution ==
This species was originally endemic to New Zealand where it lives in freshwater streams and lakes in New Zealand and adjacent small islands.

It has now spread widely and has become naturalised, and an invasive species in many areas including: Europe (since 1859 in England), Australia (including Tasmania), Asia (Japan and Iraq), and North America (USA and Canada), most likely due to inadvertent human intervention.

=== Invasion in Europe ===
Since being found in London as early as 1859, Potamopyrgus antipodarum has now spread to nearly the whole of Europe. It is considered as about the 42nd worst alien species in Europe and the second worst alien gastropod in Europe.

It does not occur in Iceland, Albania or the former Yugoslavia.

Countries where it is found include:

- Great Britain since 1859
- Ireland
- Germany
- Poland
- Western Baltic Sea since 1887
- Russia
- Azov Black Sea region, since 1951, Ukraine since 1951 in brackish waters, and since 2005 in freshwater
- Catalonia in Spain, since 1952
- Mediterranean region of France, since the end of 1950s
- Italy, since 1961
- Turkey
- Czech Republic, since September 3, 1981
- Slovakia, since 1986
- Greece, since November 2007

=== Distribution within the United States ===
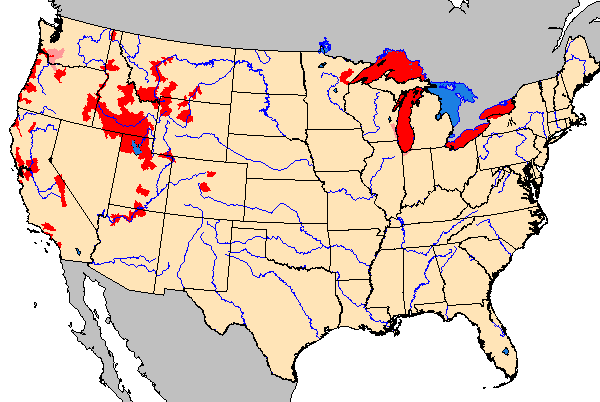
Distribution of Potamopyrgus antipodarum within the USA in 2009.

First detected in the United States in Idaho's Snake River in 1987, the mudsnail has since spread to the Madison River, Firehole River, and other watercourses around Yellowstone National Park; samples have been discovered throughout the western United States. Although the exact means of transmission is unknown, it is likely that it was introduced in water transferred with live game fish and has been spread by ship ballast or contaminated recreational equipment such as wading gear.

The New Zealand mudsnail has no natural predators or parasites in the United States, and consequently has become an invasive species. Densities have reached greater than 300,000 individuals per m^{2} in the Madison River. It can reach concentrations greater than 500,000 per m^{2}, endangering the food chain by outcompeting native snails and water insects for food, leading to sharp declines in native populations. Fish populations then suffer because the native snails and insects are their main food source.

Mudsnails are impressively resilient. A snail can live for 24 hours without water. They can however survive for up to 50 days on a damp surface, giving them ample time to be transferred from one body of water to another on fishing gear. The snails may even survive passing through the digestive systems of fish and birds.

Mudsnails have now spread from Idaho to most western states of the U.S., including Wyoming, California, Nevada, Oregon, Montana, and Colorado. Environmental officials for these states have attempted to slow the spread of the snail by advising the public to keep an eye out for the snails, and freeze or heat any gear which may contain mudsnails. Rivers have also been temporarily closed to fishing to avoid anglers spreading the snails.

The snails grow to a smaller size in the U.S. than in their native habitat, reaching 6 mm (1/4 in) at most in parts of Idaho, but can be much smaller making them easy to overlook when cleaning fishing gear.

Clonal species like the New Zealand mudsnail can often develop clonal lines with quite diverse appearances, called morphs. Until 2005, all the snails found in the western states of the U.S. were believed to be from a single line. However a second morph has been identified in Idaho's Snake River. It grows to a similar size but has a distinctive appearance. (It has been nicknamed the salt-and-pepper mudsnail due to the final whorl being lighter than the rest of the shell.) This morph has apparently been present in the area for several years before being identified correctly as a distinct morph of Potamopyrgus antipodarum. It dominates the typical morph where they overlap, and has a much higher prevalence of males.

In 1991, the New Zealand mudsnail was discovered in Lake Ontario, and has now been found in four of the five Great Lakes. In 2005 and 2006, it was found to be widespread in Lake Erie. By 2006 it had spread to Duluth-Superior Harbour and the freshwater estuary of the Saint Louis River. It was found to be inhabiting Lake Michigan, after scientists took water samples in early summer of 2008. The snails in the Great Lakes represent a different line from those found in western states, and were probably introduced indirectly through Europe.

In 2002, the New Zealand mudsnail was discovered in the Columbia River Estuary. In 2009, the species was discovered in Capitol Lake in Olympia, Washington. The lake has been closed to all public use, including boating and other recreation, since 2009. A heavy cold snap in 2013, combined with a drawdown in water level in preparation, was roughly estimated to have killed 40–60% of the mudsnail population. Other known locations include the Long Beach peninsula, Kelsey Creek (King County), Thornton Creek (King County), and Lake Washington.

In 2010, the Los Angeles Times reported that the New Zealand mudsnail had infested watersheds in the Santa Monica Mountains, posing serious threats to native species and complicating efforts to improve stream-water quality for the endangered Southern California Distinct Population Segment of steelhead. According to the article, the snails have expanded "from the first confirmed sample in Medea Creek in Agoura Hills to nearly 30 other stream sites in four years." Researchers at the Santa Monica Bay Restoration Commission believe that the snails' expansion may have been expedited after the mollusks traveled from stream to stream on the gear of contractors and volunteers.

As of 21 September 2010 In Colorado, Boulder Creek and Dry Creek have infestations of New Zealand mudsnails. The snails have been present in Boulder Creek since 2004 and were discovered in Dry Creek in September 2010. Access to both creeks has been closed to help avoid spread of the snails. In the summer of 2015 an industrial-scale wetland rehabilitation project was undertaken in northeast Boulder to rid the area of a mud snail infestation.

== Ecology ==
=== Habitat ===
The snail tolerates siltation, thrives in disturbed watersheds, and benefits from high nutrient flows allowing for filamentous green algae growth. It occurs amongst macrophytes and prefers littoral zones in lakes or slow streams with silt and organic matter substrates, but tolerates high flow environments where it can burrow into the sediment.

In the Great Lakes, the snail reaches densities as high as 5,600 per m^{2} and is found at depths of 4–45 m on a silt and sand substrate.

This species is euryhaline, establishing populations in fresh and brackish water. The optimal salinity is probably near or below 5 ppt, but Potamopyrgus antipodarum is capable of feeding, growing, and reproducing at salinities of 0–15 ppt and can tolerate 30–35 ppt for short periods of time.

It tolerates temperatures of 0–34 °C.

=== Feeding habits ===
Potamopyrgus antipodarum is a grazer-scraper, feeding on plant and animal detritus, epiphytic and periphytic algae, sediments and diatoms.

=== Life cycle ===
Potamopyrgus antipodarum is ovoviviparous and parthenogenic. This means that they can reproduce asexually; females "are born with developing embryos in their reproductive system". Native populations in New Zealand consist of diploid sexual and triploid parthenogenically cloned females, as well as sexually functional males (less than 5% of the total population). All introduced populations in North America are clonal, consisting of genetically identical females.

As the snails can reproduce both sexually and asexually, the snail has been used as a model organism for studying the costs and benefits of sexual reproduction. Asexual reproduction allows all members of a population to produce offspring and avoids the costs involved in finding mates. However, asexual offspring are clonal, so lack variation. This makes them susceptible to parasites, as the entire clonal population has the same resistance mechanisms. Once a strain of parasite has overcome these mechanisms, it is able to infect any member of the population. Sexual reproduction mixes up resistance genes through crossing over and the random assortment of gametes in meiosis, meaning the members of a sexual population will all have subtly different combinations of resistance genes. This variation in resistance genes means no one parasite strain is able to sweep through the whole population. New Zealand mudsnails are commonly infected with trematode parasites, which are particularly abundant in shallow water, but scarce in deeper water. As predicted, sexual reproduction dominates in shallow water, due to its advantages in parasite resistance. Asexual reproduction is dominant in the deeper water of lakes, as the scarcity of parasites means that the advantages of resistance are outweighed by the costs of sexual reproduction.

Each female can produce between 20 and 120 embryos. The snail produces approximately 230 young per year. Reproduction occurs in spring and summer, and the life cycle is annual. The rapid reproduction rate of the snail has caused the numbers of individuals to increase rapidly in new environments. The highest concentration of New Zealand mudsnails ever reported was in Lake Zurich, Switzerland, where the species colonized the entire lake within seven years to a density of 800,000 per m^{2}.

=== Parasites ===
The parasites of this species include at least 11 species of Trematoda. Common parasites of this snail include trematodes of the genus Microphallus.

In their native habitat, these parasites sterilize many snails, keeping the populations to a manageable size. However, elsewhere in the world in the absence of these parasites, they have become an invasive pest species.

=== Other interspecific relationships ===
Potamopyrgus antipodarum can survive passage through the guts of fish and birds and may be transported by these animals.

It can also float by itself or on mats of Cladophora spp., and move 60 m upstream in 3 months through positive rheotactic behavior. It can respond to chemical stimuli in the water, including the odor of predatory fish, which causes it to migrate to the undersides of rocks to avoid predation.

== See also ==
- Invasive species of New Zealand origin
