= Microphallidae =

Scientific classification
- Kingdom: Animalia
- Phylum: Platyhelminthes
- Class: Trematoda
- Order: Plagiorchiida
- Suborder: Xiphidiata
- Superfamily: Microphalloidea
- Family: Microphallidae; Ward, 1901

Subfamilies
- Androcotylinae; Basantisiinae; Endocotylinae; Gynaecotylinae; Levinseniellinae; Maritrematinae; Microphallinae; Sphairiotrematinae

Family of flukes

Microphallidae is a family of trematodes (flukes).
