= List of ixodid ticks of Sri Lanka =

Sri Lanka is a tropical island situated close to the southern tip of India. The invertebrate fauna is as large as it is common to other regions of the world. There are about 2 million species of arthropods found in the world, and still it is counting. So many new species are discover up to this time also. So it is very complicated and difficult to summarize the exact number of species found within a certain region.

The following list provide the hard ticks currently identified in Sri Lanka.

== Ticks ==
Ticks are small arachnids in the order Parasitiformes. Along with mites, they constitute the subclass Acari. Ticks are ectoparasites (external parasites), living by hematophagy on the blood of mammals, birds, and sometimes reptiles and amphibians. Ticks are vectors of a number of diseases that affect both humans and other animals.

Despite their poor reputation among human communities, ticks may play an ecological role by culling infirm animals and preventing overgrazing of plant resources.

The Ixodidae are a family of ticks containing the hard ticks. They are distinguished from the other main family of ticks, the soft ticks (Argasidae) by the presence of a scutum or hard shield. In both the nymph and the adult, a prominent capitulum (head) projects forwards from the animal's body; in the Argasidae, conversely, the capitulum is concealed beneath the body.

Of the 702 species in 14 genera, 27 species of hard ticks belonging to nine genera have been reported to date from Sri Lanka.

Endemic species are denoted as E.

=== Family: Ixodidae ===
- Amblyomma clypeolatum
- Amblyomma gervaisi
- Amblyomma integrum
- Amblyomma javanense
- Amblyomma testudinarium
- Amblyomma trimaculatum
- Amblyomma varanense
- Dermacentor auratus
- Ixodes petauristae
- Ixodes ceylonensis
- Haemaphysalis aculeata
- Haemaphysalis anomala
- Haemaphysalis bispinosa
- Haemaphysalis cuspidata
- Haemaphysalis hystricis
- Haemaphysalis intermedia
- Haemaphysalis kyasanurensis
- Haemaphysalis leachi
- Haemaphysalis minuta
- Haemaphysalis spinigera
- Haemaphysalis turturis
- Hyalomma brevipunctata
- Hyalomma marginatum
- Nosomma monstrosum
- Nuttalliella namaqua
- Rhipicephalus annulatus
- Rhipicephalus microplus
- Rhipicephalus haemaphysaloides
- Rhipicephalus sanguineus

== Soft ticks ==
The exact classification of soft ticks in Sri Lanka is not yet understood completely. Soft ticks are belongs to Argasidae.

- Argas persicus
- Ornithodoros savignyi
- Otobius megnini
