= H. aculeata =

H. aculeata may refer to:

- Haemaphysalis aculeata, a tick found on mouse deer
- Hakea aculeata, a rare Australian plant
- Helix aculeata, a synonym for the snail Acanthinula aculeata
