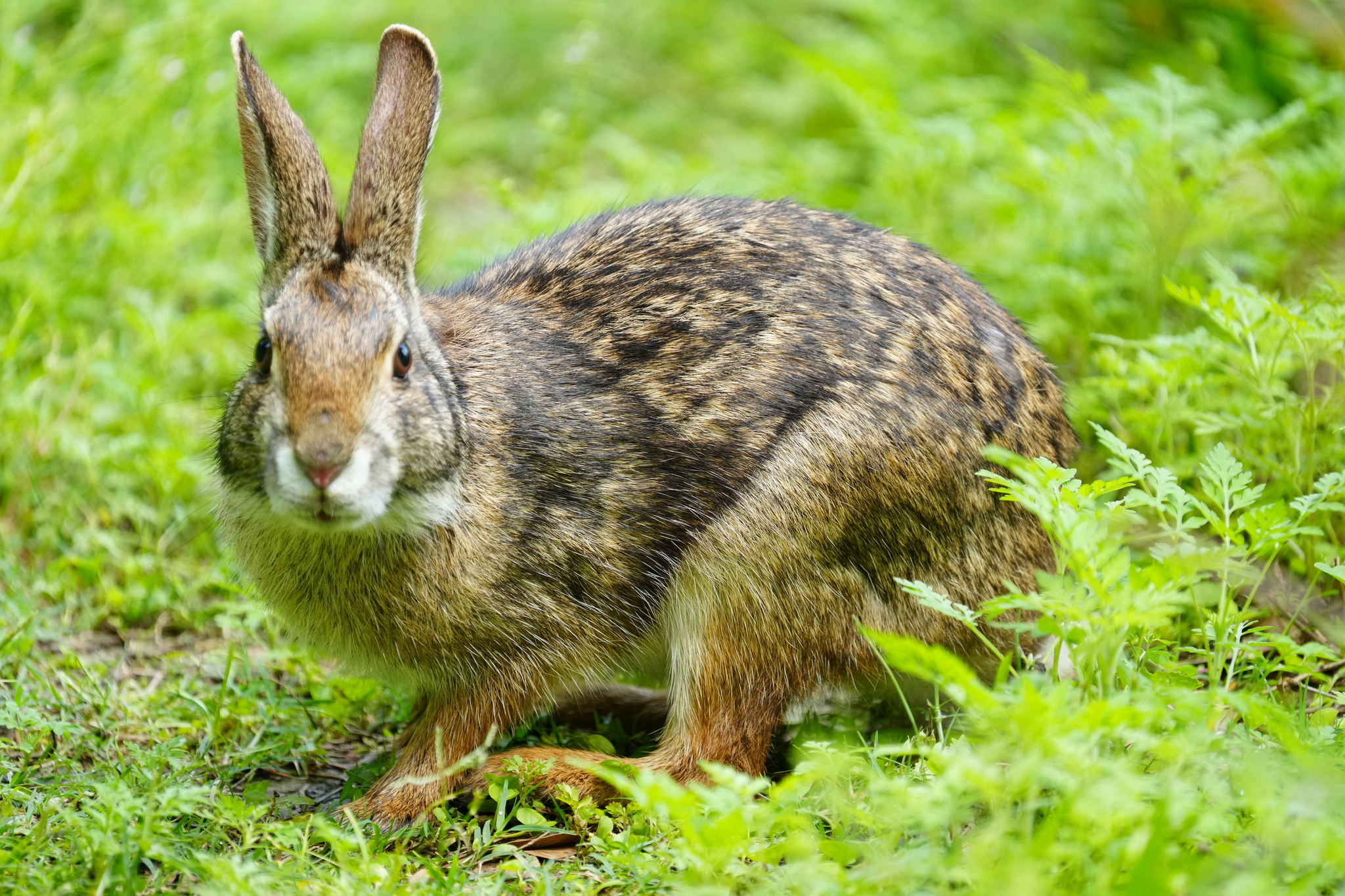
- Sylvilagus aquaticus in Baton Rouge, Louisiana, United States
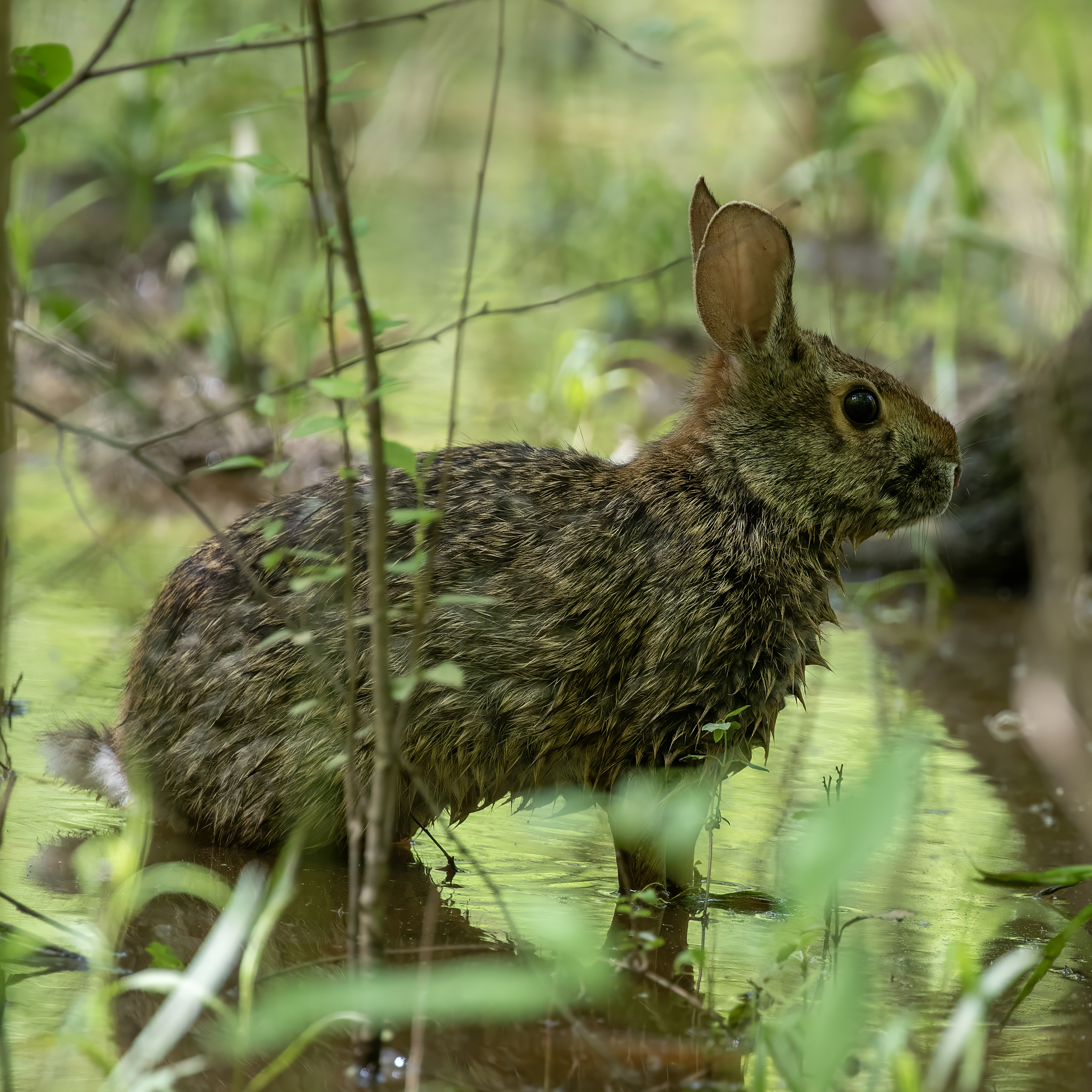
- Sylvilagus Aquaticus in Georgia, United States

Conservation status
- Least Concern (IUCN 3.1)

- Secure (NatureServe)

Scientific classification
- Kingdom: Animalia
- Phylum: Chordata
- Class: Mammalia
- Order: Lagomorpha
- Family: Leporidae
- Genus: Sylvilagus
- Species: S. aquaticus

Binomial name
- Sylvilagus aquaticus (Bachman, 1837)
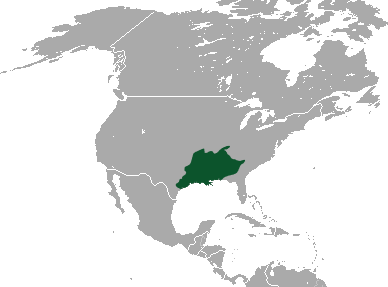
- Swamp rabbit range

Synonyms
- List: Lepus aquaticus attwateri J. A. Allen, 1895; Lepus aquaticus Bachman, 1837; Lepus telmalemonus D. G. Elliot, 1899; Limnolagus aquaticus Lyon, 1904; Limnolagus aquaticus attwateri Lyon, 1904; Limnolagus telmalemonus Lyon, 1904; Sylvilagus aquaticus Corbet & J. Edwards Hill, 1980; Sylvilagus aquaticus littoralis E. W. Nelson, 1909; Sylvilagus aquaticus aquaticus R. S. Hoffmann & A. T. Smith, 2005

= Swamp rabbit =

Swamp rabbit Temporal range: Pleistocene–recent 0.129–0 Ma

Species of mammal

The swamp rabbit (Sylvilagus aquaticus), also known as the cane cutter, swamper, or cane jake, is a species of cottontail rabbit found in the swamps and wetlands of the southern United States. It is herbivorous, territorial, and nocturnal. The largest of the cottontail rabbits, it is similar in appearance to the eastern cottontail, but has distinctly smaller ears and orange-colored hind legs. Swamp rabbits are closely related to the marsh rabbit. The two species likely separated during the Pleistocene epoch.

The swamp rabbit is most abundant in Alabama, Mississippi, and Louisiana, and also inhabits South Carolina, Arkansas, Tennessee, Texas, Oklahoma, Missouri, Kentucky, Illinois, Indiana, Georgia. Its habitat is largely dominated by regions near lowland water. Unlike other cottontail rabbits, the swamp rabbit is territorial and maintains a social order between higher- and lower-ranking males and females via displays of dominance, vocalizations, and occasional fighting. This rabbit is unique in that it ventures into water on its own, unlike other Texas rabbits, and is rarely spotted during the day due to its secretive nature. When threatened, it will take to water and swim. Swamp rabbits in a given population usually breed around the same time, giving birth to young that are born blind, immobile, and completely dependent for the first few days. Their nests—called forms—are lined with fur and grass. Each litter produces one to six young. The breeding season varies across the species' range: In Texas, the breeding season lasts all year, but elsewhere occurs between February and August.

Predators, parasites, and human interaction pose threats to the swamp rabbit. Dogs, American alligators, and feral pigs prey upon the swamp rabbit, and it is a potential host to several parasites such as roundworms, flukes, and the rabbit tick. The swamp rabbit is also affected by tularemia, an infectious disease. It is hunted for its meat and fur, and faces habitat loss due to expansion of agricultural developments that both remove usable habitat and cause frequent flooding. The International Union for Conservation of Nature lists it as a least-concern species, but in some states it is protected as a vulnerable or special concern species.

== Taxonomy and etymology ==
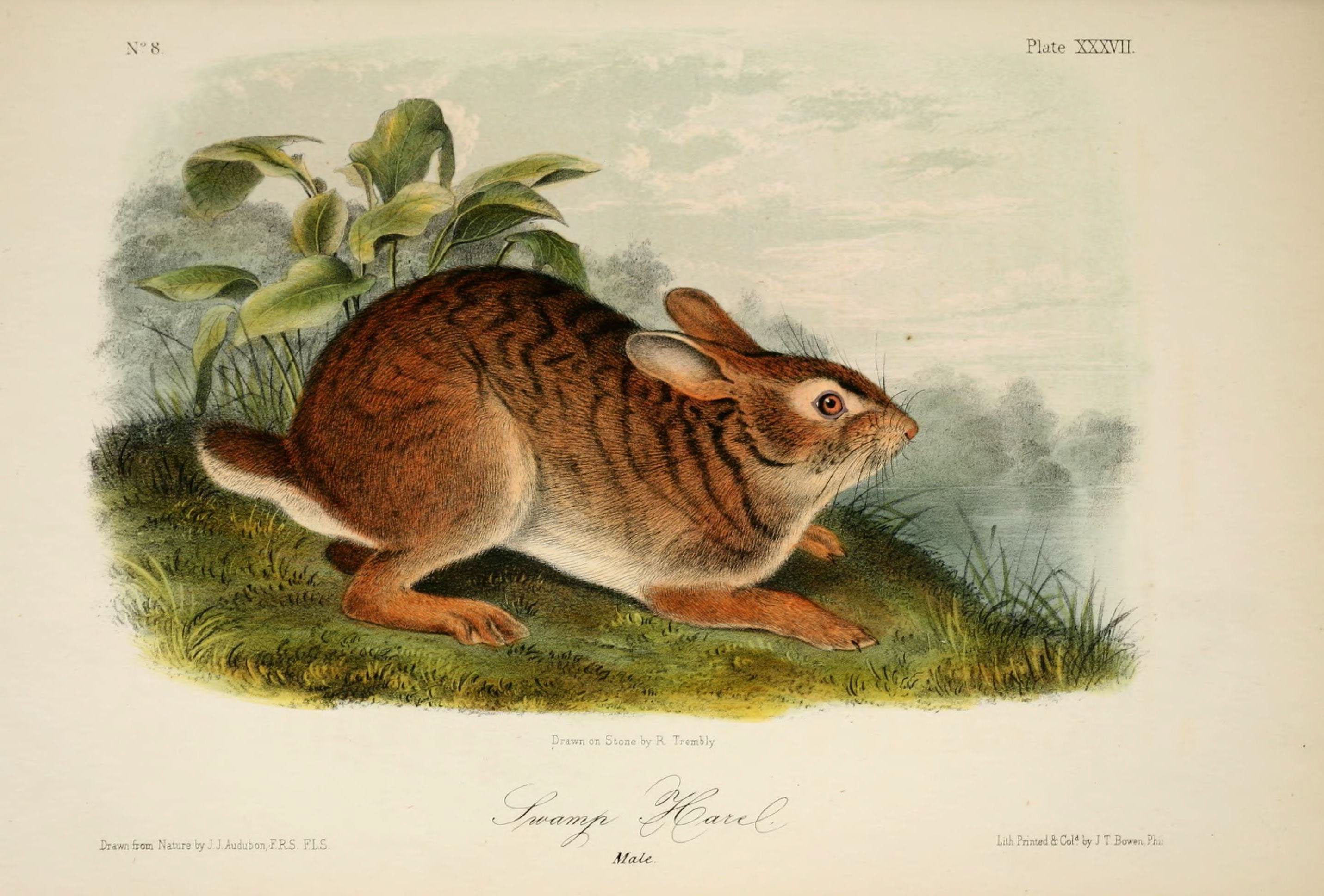
John James Audubon's 1851 illustration of a male "swamp hare"

The swamp rabbit was first described in 1837 by the American naturalist John Bachman as Lepus aquaticus, described as being collected in "western Alabama". In 1904, it was placed in the genus Limnolagus as the type species by American mammalogist Marcus Ward Lyon Jr.; the name was previously used as the subgenus of both the swamp rabbit and marsh rabbit (S. palustris) in an 1899 work by the Swiss physician Charles Immanuel Forsyth Major. Edward William Nelson, an American naturalist, clarified several years later in 1909 that the species belonged to Sylvilagus and grouped it alongside the marsh rabbit. Common names of the swamp rabbit include "cane cutter", "swamper", and "cane jake".

Two subspecies are recognized: Sylvilagus aquaticus aquaticus, the nominate subspecies that occupies most of the swamp rabbit's recognized distribution, and Sylvilagus aquaticus littoralis, the coast swamp rabbit, which is found only in a narrow band of marshes in Mississippi, Louisiana, and Texas along the Gulf of Mexico coast. Nelson made the distinction between the subspecies in the same 1909 work where the species was classified as a member of Sylvilagus, noting that the littoralis form had "remarkable" differences from the nominate subspecies and that it had been assumed to be the "true aquaticus" in prior studies.

=== Fossil record ===
Sylvilagus aquaticus fossils have been identified as early as the Pleistocene epoch, with a 1940 discovery of molar teeth found in a Missouri deposit dating back to that era. Glaciations from the Illinoian stage (a geological period in North America ranging from 0.191 to 0.13 million years ago) likely created refugia that led to the emergence of the swamp rabbit as a distinct species. Glacial movements in the late Pleistocene (during and after the Illinoian) created a hybrid zone in western Georgia, which likely led to the separation of the swamp rabbit from the marsh rabbit (S. palustris), its closest relative.

=== Phylogeny ===
The swamp rabbit has 38 diploid chromosomes, the same number as the marsh rabbit and fewer than several other members of Sylvilagus. Based on mitochondrial and nuclear gene analysis, its closest genetic relative is the marsh rabbit, with which it forms a clade. Its next closest relatives are the desert cottontail (S. audubonii) and mountain cottontail (S. nuttallii).

== Range and habitat ==
The swamp rabbit is found in much of the south-central United States and along the Gulf coast. It is most abundant in Alabama, Mississippi, and Louisiana, but also inhabits South Carolina, Arkansas, Tennessee, Texas, Oklahoma, Missouri, Kentucky, Illinois, Indiana, and Georgia. It is possibly extirpated (locally extinct) from Kansas.

Swamp rabbits mainly live close to lowland water, often in cypress swamps, marshland, floodplain, and river tributaries. Swamp rabbits spend much of their time in depressions which they dig in tall grass or leaves, providing cover while they wait until the nighttime to forage. The swamp rabbit has been suggested for use as an indicator species, as its preferred habitat is shared by many other species, the rabbit makes use of different aspects of its habitat, and monitoring is easy to do. The ranges of both the marsh rabbit and eastern cottontail overlap with that of the swamp rabbit.

Habitat loss and fragmentation have caused declines in swamp rabbit populations. In the northernmost regions of its range, the rabbit is particularly vulnerable during snowy days, as its dark coat makes it particularly visible against the white background, making it more vulnerable to predators. Snow cover constrains both hiding ability and availability of food resources.

== Characteristics ==
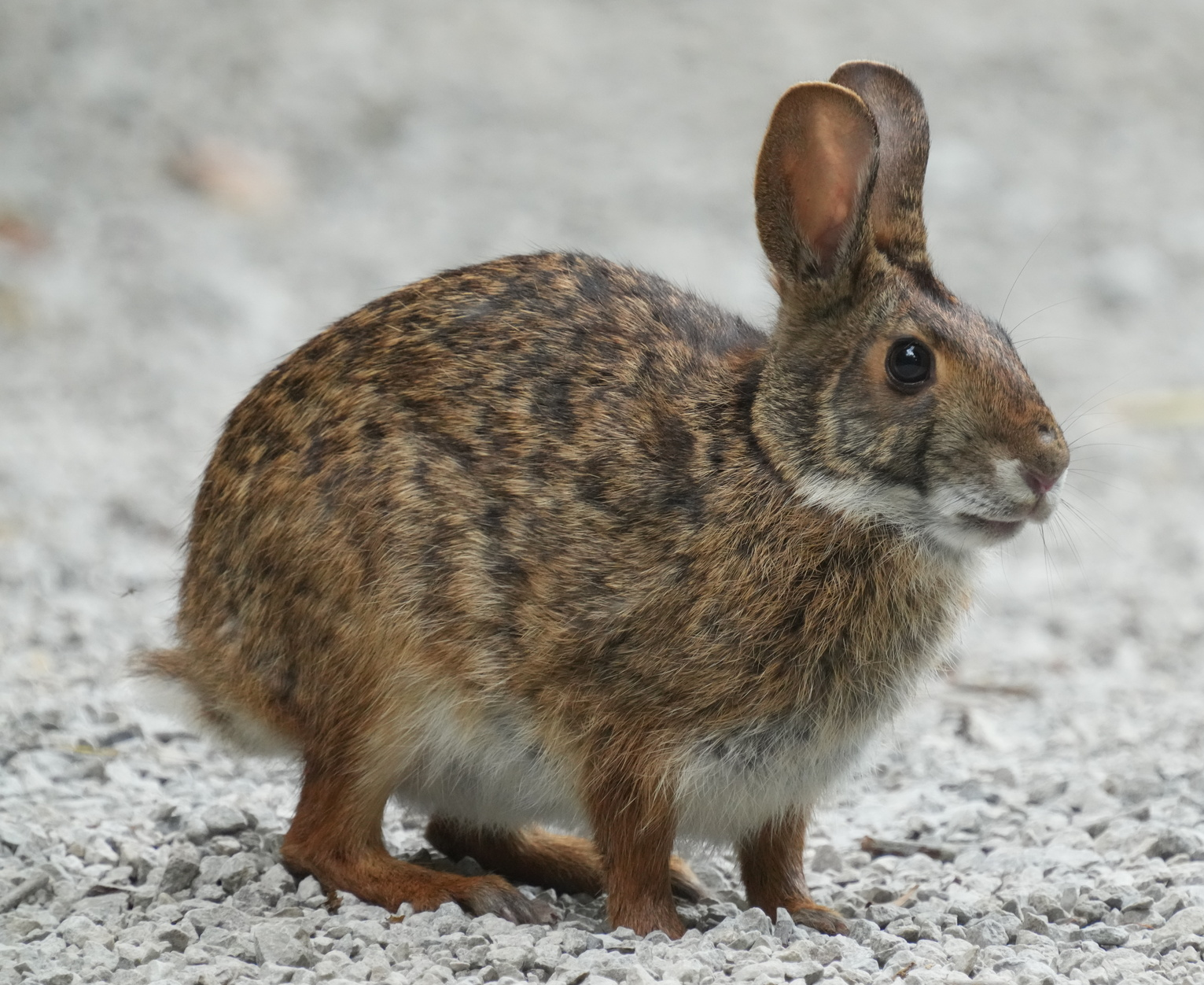
S. aquaticus in Bluebonnet Swamp Nature Center

Sylvilagus aquaticus is the largest of the cottontail species, although its ears are smaller than those of other cottontails, being medium-sized with relation to the rest of its body. The head and back are typically dark or rusty brown or black, while the throat, ventral surface, and tail are white, and there is a cinnamon-colored ring around the eye. While largely similar to eastern cottontails (S. floridanus) in appearance, the swamp rabbit differs in the sizes of its ears and skull; the former are much smaller, and the latter is larger. Additionally, the back portions of the swamp rabbit's hind legs are orange, in contrast to the tan or white feet of the eastern cottontail. Like other leporids, it has a dental formula of 2.0.3.31.0.2.3 × 2 = 28—two pairs of upper and one pair of lower incisors, no canines, three upper and two lower premolars on each side, and three upper and lower molars on either side of the jaw.

Sylvilagus aquaticus males vary in weight from approximately 4 to 5.6 lb (1.8 to 2.5 kg), with an average of about 5 lb (2.3 kg); females vary from approx. 3.6 to 5.9 lb (1.6 to 2.7 kg), averaging about 4.8 lb (2.2 kg). S. aquaticus ranges in length from approx. 17.8 inches (45 cm) to 21.7 in (55 cm), with an average length of about 19.7 in (50 cm). Males and females of the species show very little sexual dimorphism with regard to size. The subspecies S. a. littoralis is distinguished from the nominate subspecies by its darker, redder fur color, in addition to its geographic restriction to the Gulf coast. Very little is known about the physiology of the swamp rabbit.

== Ecology and behavior ==
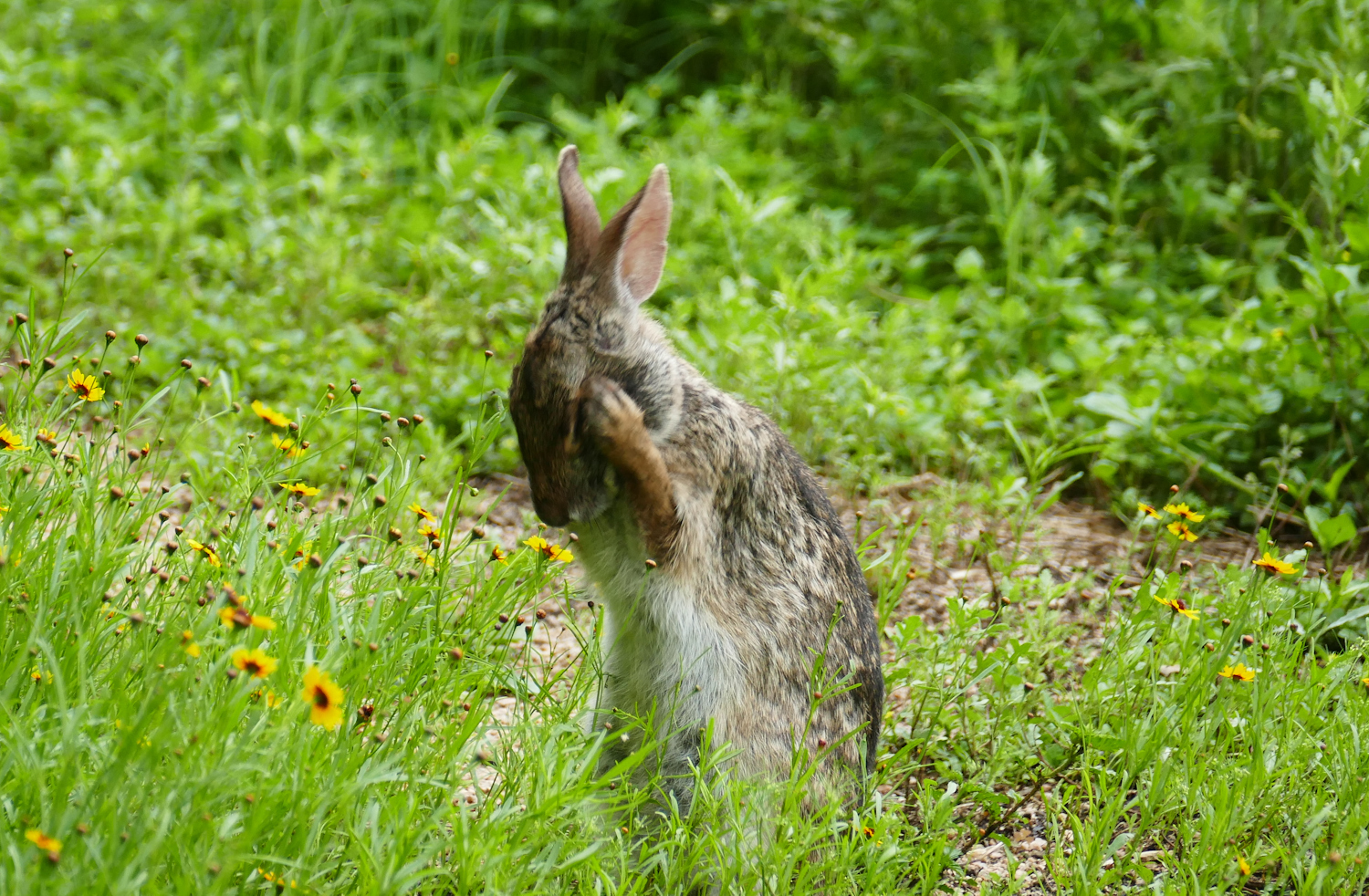
Swamp rabbit in Brazoria County, Texas, grooming itself

Swamp rabbits are territorial, though they will tolerate some overlap between the home ranges of individuals depending on the season. These home ranges can vary in size from 1 to 12 hectares (2.5 to 29.7 acres). They will mark their territory by "chinning"—marking objects with pheromones produced from glands near the chin. This behavior is also noted in the European rabbit. Males that are competing for territory or status may fight, with battles sometimes resulting in the death of an individual. Males will stand up on their hind legs, lashing out with their teeth and claws, and will even use the claws on their hind feet in jumping attacks. However, compared to nonviolent displays of dominance and submission, fighting is rare.

Swamp rabbits maintain social order through displays of dominance, and communicate directly through vocalizations such as squeaks, chirps, squeals and alert calls. Higher-ranking males will display dominance over lower-ranking males more frequently, and will move within the home ranges of females more frequently, with the alpha male copulating most often in a given season. The system of male dominance prevents injury between subordinate breeding males under the alpha, as the lower-ranking individuals will avoid higher-ranking males to prevent conflict. When escaping, swamp rabbits will use confusing maneuvers to evade a pursuer, such as jumping onto a log, running to the end, then backtracking and jumping off the other side. They are excellent swimmers, and may also dive into water to escape, sometimes keeping only the nose and eyes above the water.

=== Diet ===
Swamp rabbits are herbivorous; they eat a variety of foraged plants, including grasses, sedges such as Carex, shrubs, tree bark seedlings, and twigs. Though mostly nocturnal, the swamp rabbit may emerge during rain showers to feed during the day. The preferred foods of S. aquaticus are savannah panicgrass (Panicum gymnocarpum), false nettle (Boehmeria cylindrica), dewberry (Rubus trivialis) and greenbrier (Smilax bona-nox).

Like all lagomorphs (rabbits, hares, and pikas), the swamp rabbit performs cecotrophy to get more nutrition from its food. In this process, food passes through the digestive tract twice, as the swamp rabbit will immediately consume moist pellets expelled from the anus without chewing and leave behind the dry pellets that are subsequently produced. This process is considered similar to the cud-chewing behavior of ruminants.

=== Reproduction ===
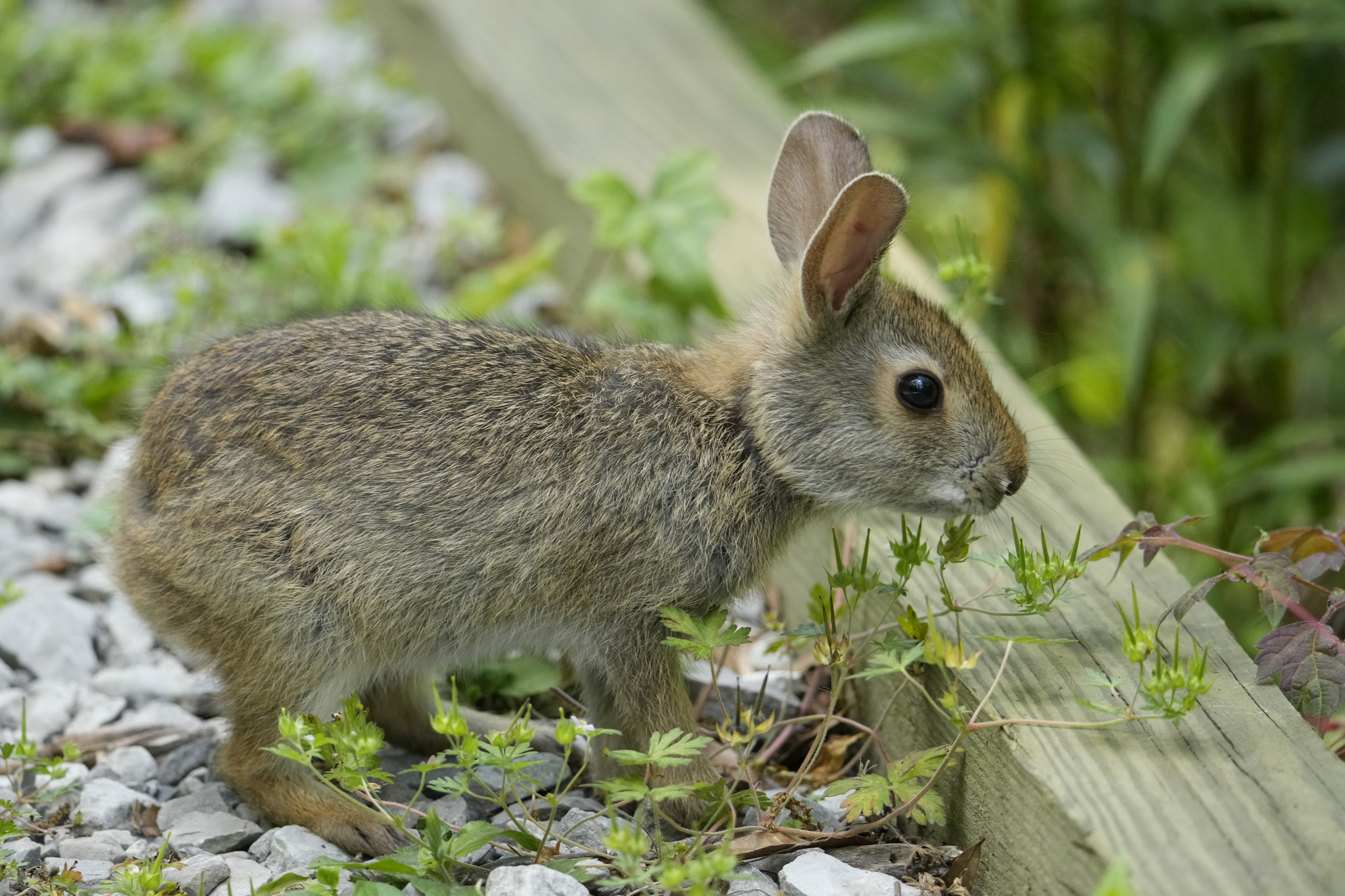
Juvenile swamp rabbit

Swamp rabbits are synchronous breeders, and tend to breed all at the same time within a population. Females will line a depression in the ground with fur and grass to form a birthing nest. These nests, also used for thermoregulation, are known as forms and are common among the non-burrowing species of rabbit. Females give birth to altricial young—they are immobile upon birth, and only open their eyes and walk after three days. Weaning ends at 15 days, at which point the young leave the nest. They become sexually mature at seven months and reach their adult weight at 10 months. Little is known about the recruitment behavior of juveniles into larger groups.

The swamp rabbit's breeding season varies across its range. It occurs year-round in Texas, but elsewhere may take place between February and August. Spermatogenesis occurs in October and November according to a Missouri study, and in Mississippi, recorded males had descended testes more often in December and February than in any other months. Estrus lasts one hour following induced ovulation. Gestation lasts 37 days on average. Up to three litters are produced annually, with each litter producing one to six young. Embryo resorption can occur in S. aquaticus in response to stress, causing loss of litters. This is attributed to flooding, which can cause overcrowding as well as directly inducing the release of stress hormones.

=== Predators, parasites and diseases ===
Known predators of Sylvilagus aquaticus are domestic dogs, American alligators, and humans. Feral pigs are also a potential predator. The swamp rabbit cannot swim fast enough to escape hunting dogs, and so will attempt to escape pursuers by hiding under water among plants and brush with only its nose above the surface. The species is hunted for fur, meat, and sport, and is the second-most commonly hunted rabbit in the United States. Swamp rabbits have several adaptations to avoid predators: cryptic coloration, "freezing", and rapid, irregular jumping patterns.

Sylvilagus aquaticus is susceptible to parasitism from various roundworms in the genus Brugia, specifically B. lepori, which is endemic to Louisiana. The roundworms live in the subcutaneous and lymphatic tissue of the rabbit. B. lepori is also known to affect the eastern cottontail, and is suspected as an agent of human Brugia infections in the northeastern United States. S. aquaticus is also affected by other internal parasites, including trematodes and cestodes, as well as the parasitic tick Haemaphysalis leporispalustris. It is known to contract tularemia and leptospirosis, though the latter disease is not considered to have a major impact on mortality.

== Relationship with humans ==
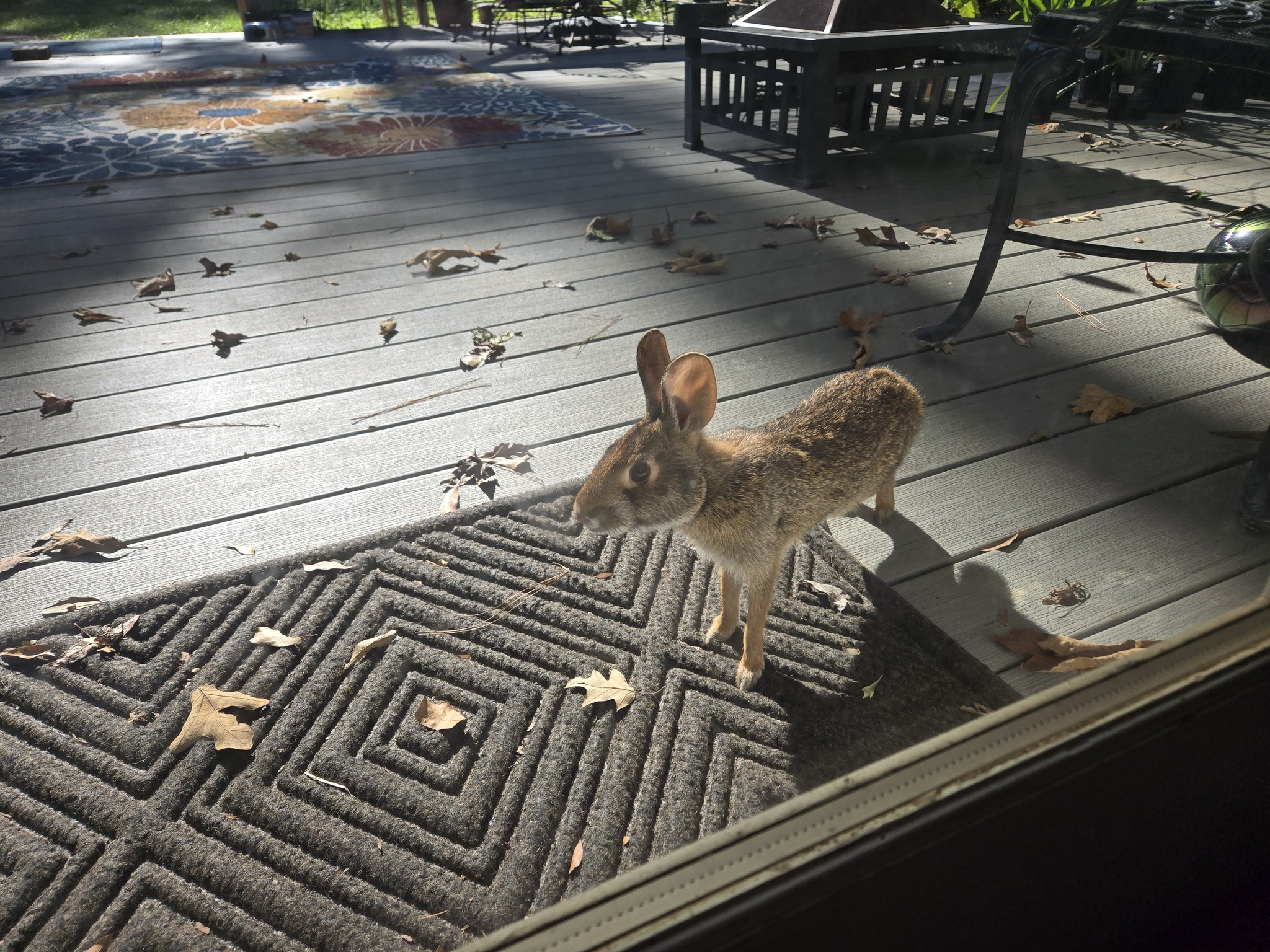
A swamp rabbit in St. Tammany Parish, Louisiana

The swamp rabbit has an average lifespan of 1.8 years, but individuals living up to 9 years have been recorded. It is hunted in its native range, both for its products (meat and fur) and for sport, which has been noted as not significantly affecting populations. Agricultural development within its range has caused habitat loss, as these developments both alter the usable habitat and increase severity and frequency of flooding. The swamp rabbit is occasionally kept in captivity as a subject of study.

=== Conservation ===
Sylvilagus aquaticus is protected by state-level regulations in some areas. In Indiana, it is classified as "State Endangered", and in Missouri and South Carolina, it is a species of special concern. The International Union for Conservation of Nature considers it a least-concern species as of 2019, though it notes that the population is decreasing overall.

== See also ==
- Jimmy Carter rabbit incident
