= Haemaphysalis turturis =

Scientific classification
- Kingdom: Animalia
- Phylum: Arthropoda
- Subphylum: Chelicerata
- Class: Arachnida
- Order: Ixodida
- Family: Ixodidae
- Genus: Haemaphysalis
- Species: H. turturis

Binomial name
- Haemaphysalis turturis Nuttall & Warburton, 1915

Synonyms
- Haemaphysalis turturis latipunctata Toumanoff, 1944 (misapplied name); Haemaphysalis (Subkaiseriana) turturis Hoogstraal, in litt. (published 1998)

Species of tick

Haemaphysalis turturis is a hard-bodied tick of the family Ixodidae. It is found in India and Sri Lanka. It is an obligate ectoparasite of mammals. It is a potential vector of Kyasanur Forest disease virus, and ganjam virus.
