= Haemaphysalis intermedia =

Scientific classification
- Kingdom: Animalia
- Phylum: Arthropoda
- Subphylum: Chelicerata
- Class: Arachnida
- Order: Ixodida
- Family: Ixodidae
- Genus: Haemaphysalis
- Species: H. intermedia

Binomial name
- Haemaphysalis intermedia Warburton & Nuttall, 1909

Synonyms
- Haemaphysalis bispinosa intermedia Warburton & Nuttall, 1909; Haemaphysalis parva Neumann, 1908 (misapplied name); Haemaphysalis (Haemaphysalis) intermedia Hoogstraal, 1971; Haemaphysalis (Kaiseriana) intermedia Hoogstraal, in litt. (published 1998)

Species of tick

Haemaphysalis intermedia, the flat-inner-spurred haemaphysalid, is a hard-bodied tick of the genus Haemaphysalis. It is found in India and Sri Lanka. It is an obligate ectoparasite of mammals (a parasite that lives outside its host). It is a potential vector of Kyasanur Forest disease virus, Ganjam virus, and Nairobi sheep disease virus.

== Parasitism ==
Adults parasitize various wild and domestic mammals. Ticks can be controlled by using cypermethrin.
