= Ixodes petauristae =

Scientific classification
- Kingdom: Animalia
- Phylum: Arthropoda
- Subphylum: Chelicerata
- Class: Arachnida
- Order: Ixodida
- Family: Ixodidae
- Genus: Ixodes
- Species: I. petauristae

Binomial name
- Ixodes petauristae Warburton, 1933

Synonyms
- Ixodes kerri Rao, 1955; Ixodes pseudoholocyclus Sénevet, 1969; Ixodes (Indixodes) petauristae Morel stat.

Species of tick

Ixodes petauristae is a hard-bodied tick of the genus Ixodes. It is found in India and Sri Lanka. Adults parasitize various smaller mammals such as Ratufa indica, Funambulus tristriatus, Macaca radiata, Petaurista sp. and mice. It is a potential vector of Kyasanur Forest disease virus,
