= Haemaphysalis cuspidata =

Scientific classification
- Domain: Eukaryota
- Kingdom: Animalia
- Phylum: Arthropoda
- Subphylum: Chelicerata
- Class: Arachnida
- Order: Ixodida
- Family: Ixodidae
- Genus: Haemaphysalis
- Species: H. cuspidata

Binomial name
- Haemaphysalis cuspidata Warburton, 1910

Synonyms
- Haemaphysalis (Kaiseriana) cuspidata Hoogstraal & Kim, 1985

Species of tick

Haemaphysalis cuspidata is a hard-bodied tick of the genus Haemaphysalis. It is found in India and Sri Lanka. It is a potential vector of Kyasanur Forest disease virus.

== Parasitism ==
Adults parasitize various wild and domestic animals such as jackals, mouse deer, leopards, black naped hare, rats, Paradoxurus civets, mongooses, coucals, many birds, shrews and even humans. Larva and nymphs are parasites of porcupines, civets, jungle fowls, many robin species, shrews, hornbills, macaques, langurs, cattle and buffaloes.
