= Haemaphysalis anomala =

Scientific classification
- Domain: Eukaryota
- Kingdom: Animalia
- Phylum: Arthropoda
- Subphylum: Chelicerata
- Class: Arachnida
- Order: Ixodida
- Family: Ixodidae
- Genus: Haemaphysalis
- Species: H. anomala

Binomial name
- Haemaphysalis anomala Warburton, 1913

Synonyms
- Haemaphysalis cornigera anomala Warburton, 1913; Haemaphysalis novaeguineae Toumanoff, 1944 (misapplied name); Haemaphysalis (Kaiseriana) anomala Hoogstraal, Kohls & Trapido, 1967

Species of tick

Haemaphysalis anomala is a hard-bodied tick of the family Ixodidae. It is found in India, Vietnam and Sri Lanka. It is an obligate ectoparasite of mammals.

== Parasitism ==
Adults parasitize various mammals such as Bubalus bubalis and domestic cattle. Larva and nymphs are parasite on birds such as Centropus sinensis and small mammals like Rattus species. It is a potential vector of Kyasanur Forest disease virus.
