= Haemaphysalis luzonensis =

Scientific classification
- Domain: Eukaryota
- Kingdom: Animalia
- Phylum: Arthropoda
- Subphylum: Chelicerata
- Class: Arachnida
- Order: Ixodida
- Family: Ixodidae
- Genus: Haemaphysalis
- Species: H. luzonensis

Binomial name
- Haemaphysalis luzonensis Hoogstraal & Parrish, 1968

Species of tick

Haemaphysalis luzonensis, the Luzon mountain glossy haemaphysalid, is an ixodid tick native to Luzon Island, Republic of the Philippines first circumscribed by entomologists Dr. Harry Hoogstraal and United States Air Force Maj. Dale Parrish in 1968. Its common name reflects its glossy and nearly apunctate, in comparison to other Haemaphysalis ticks, dorsal integument.

== Bionomics ==
H. luzonensis inhabits forests dominated by Dipterocarpus plants and Benguet pine at altitudes between 1,800 and 3,000 feet of the mountains in the central western part of the Sierra Madre Mountain range of Luzon Island. It parasitizes the Philippine deer and the Philippine warty pig in Nueva Ecija and Quezon Provinces of Luzon Island. Collection data suggest that both vertebrates are important hosts of adults and nymphs of this tick species. Males, females, and nymphs were documented to feed on their hosts between October and August, suggesting that they are active year-round. The larvae, which are very small, may feed at different seasons or on different hosts. Other tick species feeding on deer and boar included Boophilus microplus, Haemaphysalis psalistos, Haemaphysalis rusae, Hemaphysalis papuana group, Amblyomma species, Dermacentor species, Rhipicephalus haemaphysaloides, and Rhipicephalus sanguineus. The biology of this species is similar to that of Haemaphysalis lagrangei in Vietnam.
