= Haemaphysalis hystricis =

Scientific classification
- Kingdom: Animalia
- Phylum: Arthropoda
- Subphylum: Chelicerata
- Class: Arachnida
- Order: Ixodida
- Family: Ixodidae
- Genus: Haemaphysalis
- Species: H. hystricis

Binomial name
- Haemaphysalis hystricis Supino, 1897

Synonyms
- Haemaphysalis genevrayi Toumanoff, 1944; Haemaphysalis iwasakii Sugimoto, 1937; Haemaphysalis menui Toumanoff, 1944; Haemaphysalis nishiyamai Luh & Woo, 1950; Haemaphysalis nishiyamai Sugimoto, 1935; Haemaphysalis tieni Phan Trong, 1977; Haemaphysalis trispinosa Toumanoff, 1941; Haemaphysalis (Kaiseriana) hystricis Hoogstraal & Kim, 1985

Species of tick

Haemaphysalis hystricis, the East Asian mountain haemaphysalid, is a hard-bodied tick of the genus Haemaphysalis. It is found in India, Sri Lanka, Vietnam, Myanmar, China, Japan, India, Indonesia, Laos, Taiwan and Thailand. It is an obligate ectoparasite of mammals. It is a potential vector of Kyasanur Forest disease virus, Coxiella sp., Ehrlichia sp., and Rickettsia japonica. In 2007, an unknown trypanosoma species known as Trypanosoma KG1 isolate was isolated from naturally infected H. hystricis ticks.

== Parasitism ==
Adults parasitize various wild and domestic mammals such as domestic cattle, dogs, and humans.
