= Haemaphysalis minuta =

Scientific classification
- Domain: Eukaryota
- Kingdom: Animalia
- Phylum: Arthropoda
- Subphylum: Chelicerata
- Class: Arachnida
- Order: Ixodida
- Family: Ixodidae
- Genus: Haemaphysalis
- Species: H. minuta

Binomial name
- Haemaphysalis minuta Kohls, 1950

Synonyms
- Haemaphysalis (Ornithophysalis) minuta Hoogstraal & Wassef, 1973

Species of tick

Haemaphysalis minuta, is a hard-bodied tick of the genus Haemaphysalis. It is found in India and Sri Lanka. It is an obligate ectoparasite of mammals. It is a potential vector of Kyasanur Forest disease virus.
