= Haemaphysalis hispanica =

Scientific classification
- Domain: Eukaryota
- Kingdom: Animalia
- Phylum: Arthropoda
- Subphylum: Chelicerata
- Class: Arachnida
- Order: Ixodida
- Family: Ixodidae
- Genus: Haemaphysalis
- Species: H. hispanica

Binomial name
- Haemaphysalis hispanica Gil Collado, 1938

Species of tick

Haemaphysalis hispanica is a tick species found in Europe. It is a relict parasite of the European rabbit, Oryctolagus cuniculus. It may have no role in transmitting pathogens to humans, but it is of importance in the epidemiology of certain diseases by maintaining the etiologic agent in a tick–vertebrate–tick cycle that can be intruded into by immature or adult stages of species that sometimes parasitize humans.

H. hispanica is related to species parasitizing carnivores in Asia and Madagascar, and hyraxes in the Ethiopian Faunal Region.

The male is 1.5 mm in length from the palpal apices to the posterior scutal margin, and 1.0 mm in breadth. The female resembles the male except for secondary sexual characters. Both are of reddish-yellow color.
