= Haemaphysalis bispinosa =

Scientific classification
- Kingdom: Animalia
- Phylum: Arthropoda
- Subphylum: Chelicerata
- Class: Arachnida
- Order: Ixodida
- Family: Ixodidae
- Genus: Haemaphysalis
- Species: H. bispinosa

Binomial name
- Haemaphysalis bispinosa Neumann, 1897

Synonyms
- Haemaphysalis bispinosa bispinosa Santos Dias, 1954; Haemaphysalis hispinosa Neumann, 1897 (misapplied name); Haemaphysalis (Kaiseriana) bispinosa Santos Dias, 1963

Species of tick

Haemaphysalis bispinosa is a hard-bodied tick of the genus Haemaphysalis. It is found in India, Sri Lanka, Myanmar, Pakistan, Nepal, Australia, and Indonesia. It is an obligate ectoparasite of mammals. It is a potential vector of Kyasanur Forest disease virus. These ticks was found parasitized by a chalcid Hunterellus sagarensis in these diseased areas.

== Parasitism ==
Adults parasitize various wild and domestic mammals such as domestic cattle, goats, and sheep and various bird species. It is a potential vector of Bartonella bovis, which causing Bartonellosis.
