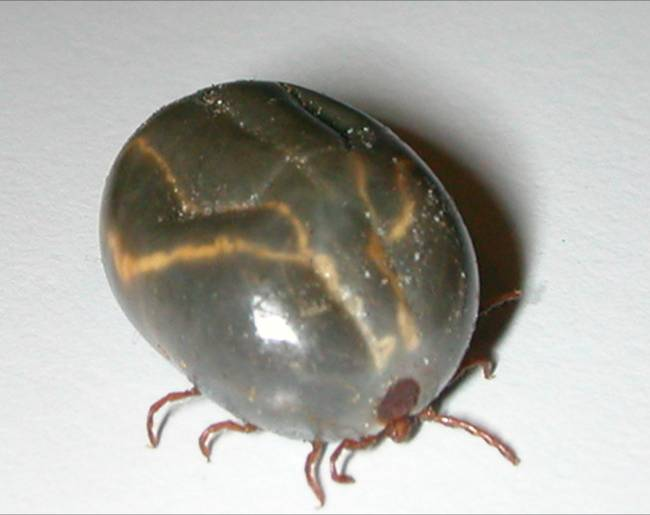
- Haemaphysalis longicornis

Scientific classification
- Kingdom: Animalia
- Phylum: Arthropoda
- Subphylum: Chelicerata
- Class: Arachnida
- Order: Ixodida
- Family: Ixodidae
- Subfamily: Haemaphysalinae
- Genus: Haemaphysalis; Koch, 1844

Species
- 170 extant, see text.

= Haemaphysalis =

Haemaphysalis Temporal range: Cretaceous–present

Genus of ticks

Haemaphysalis is a genus of hard ticks. It is the second largest genus in the family Ixodidae, after Ixodes, and the largest genus of the Metastriata. Haemaphysalis ticks are found on all continents and across all major zoogeographical regions, except Antarctica, although most species are found in the Oriental and Afrotropical regions. Approximately 80% of the species are present in Asia and Africa, with significantly less species diversity in Europe and the Americas. Haemaphysalis species primarily parasitise birds and mammals.

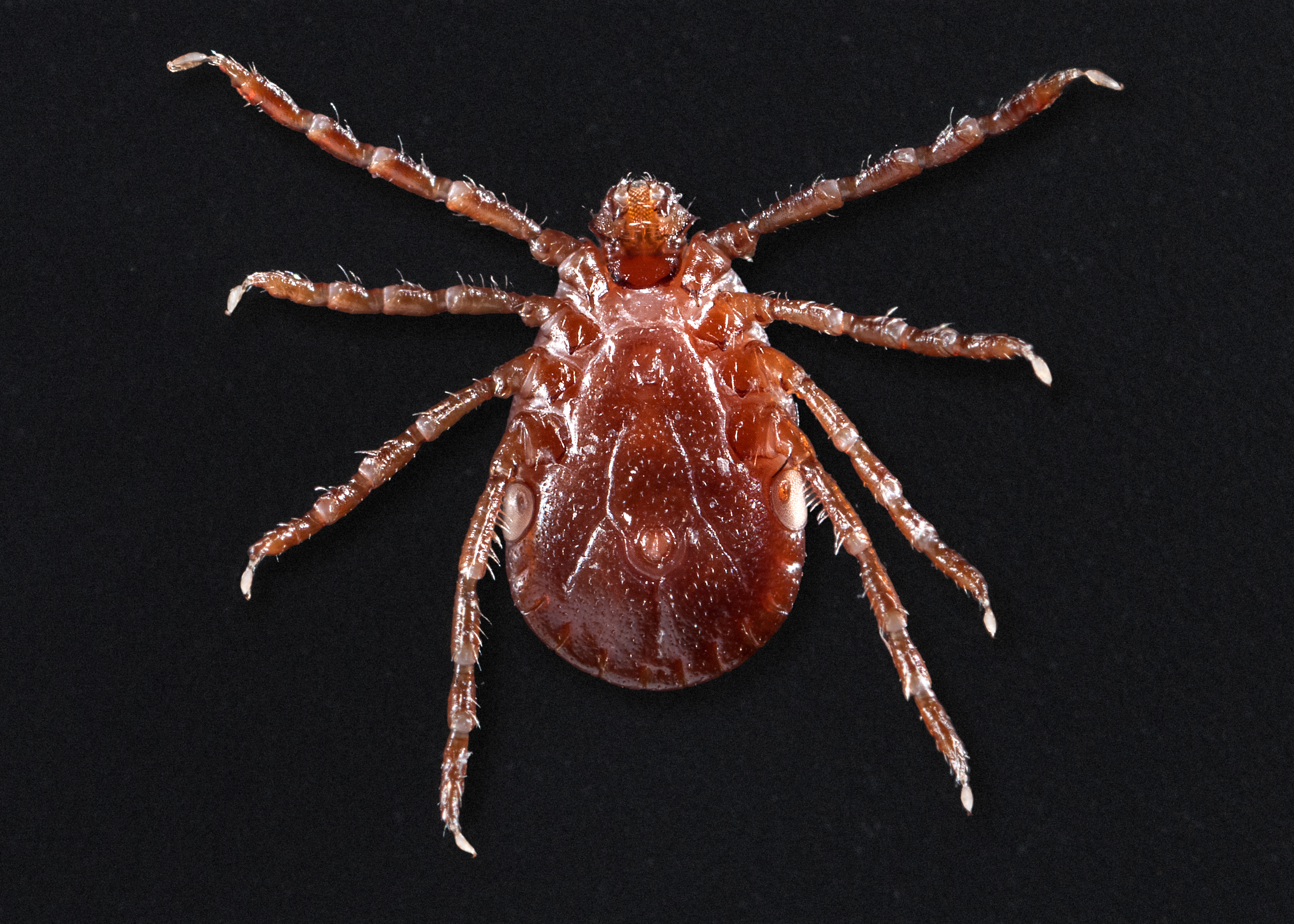
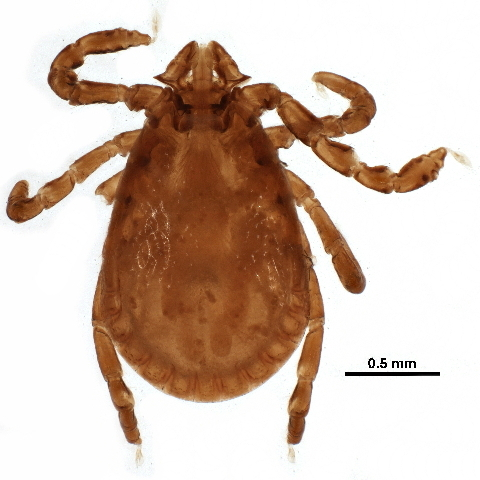
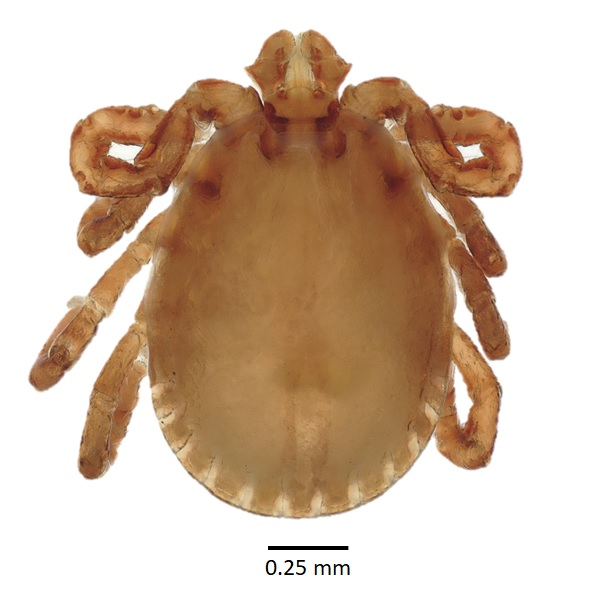
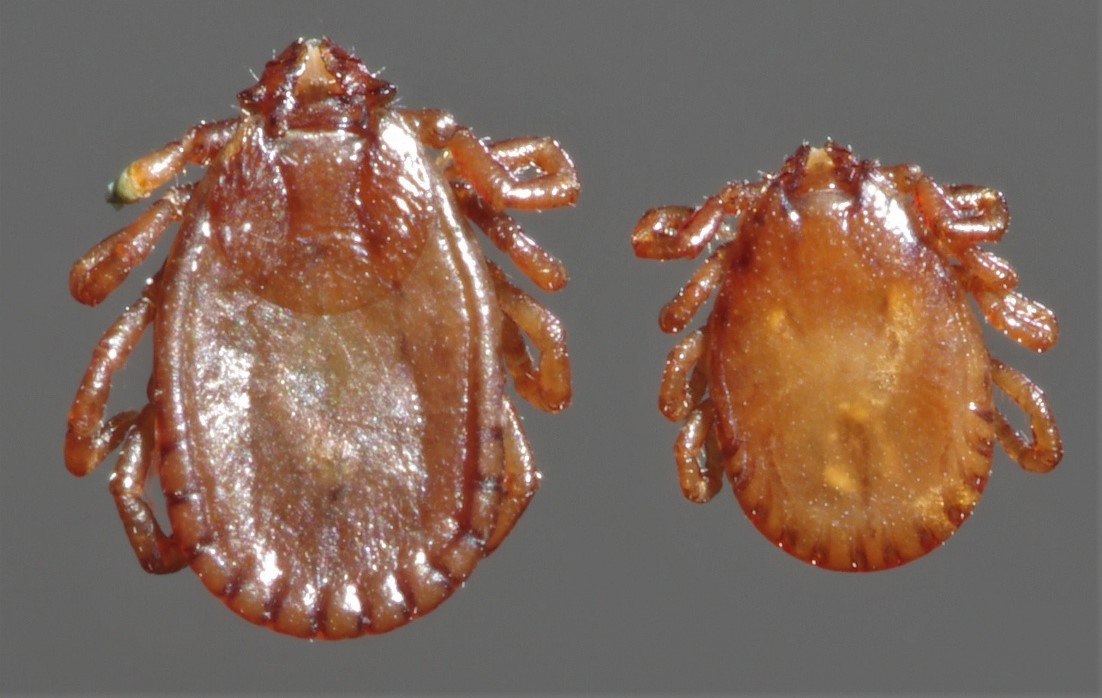
Top down, L>R: Haemaphysalis longicornis, Haemaphysalis leporispalustris, Haemaphysalis pentalagi, Haemaphysalis bancrofti.
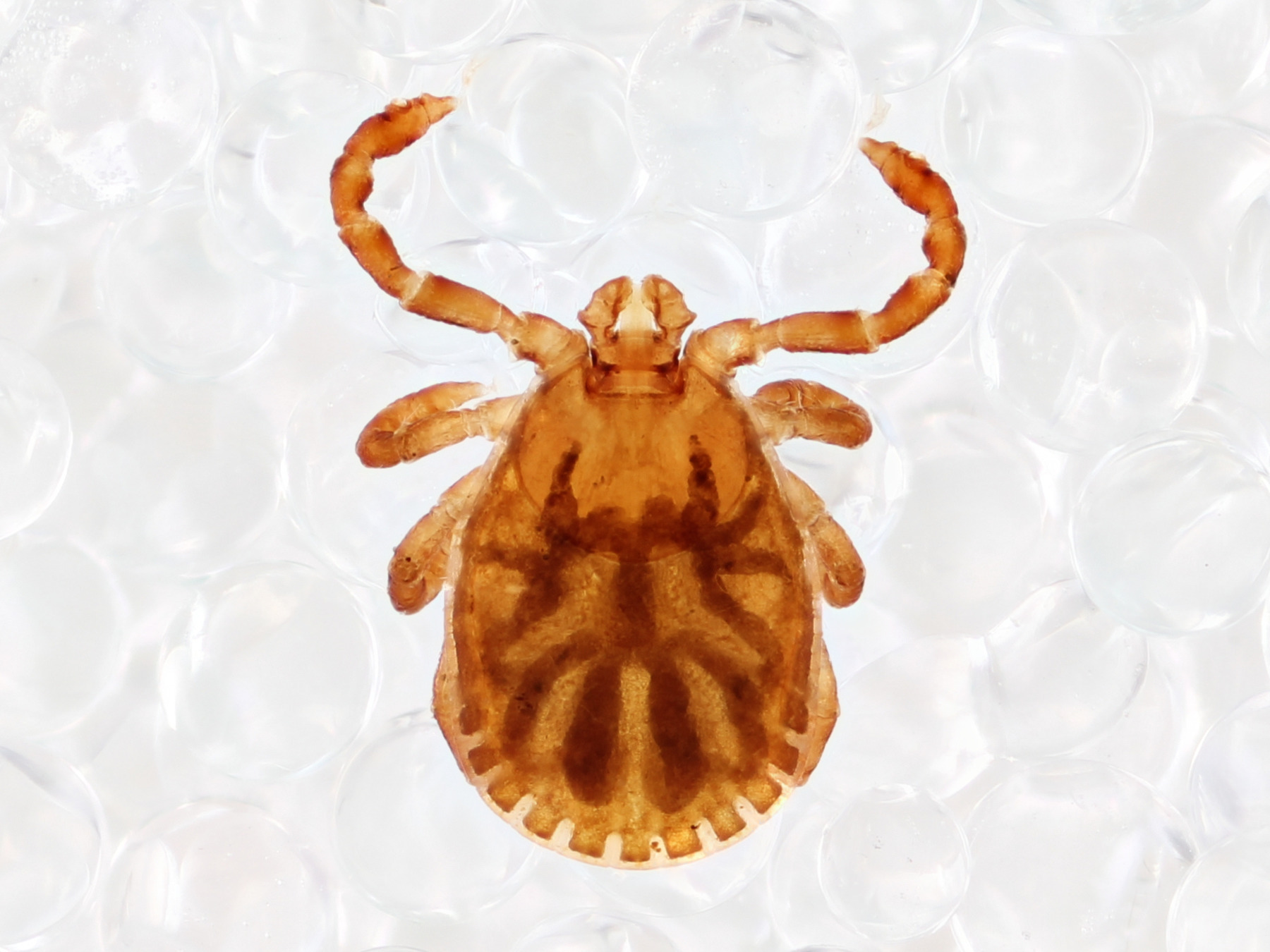
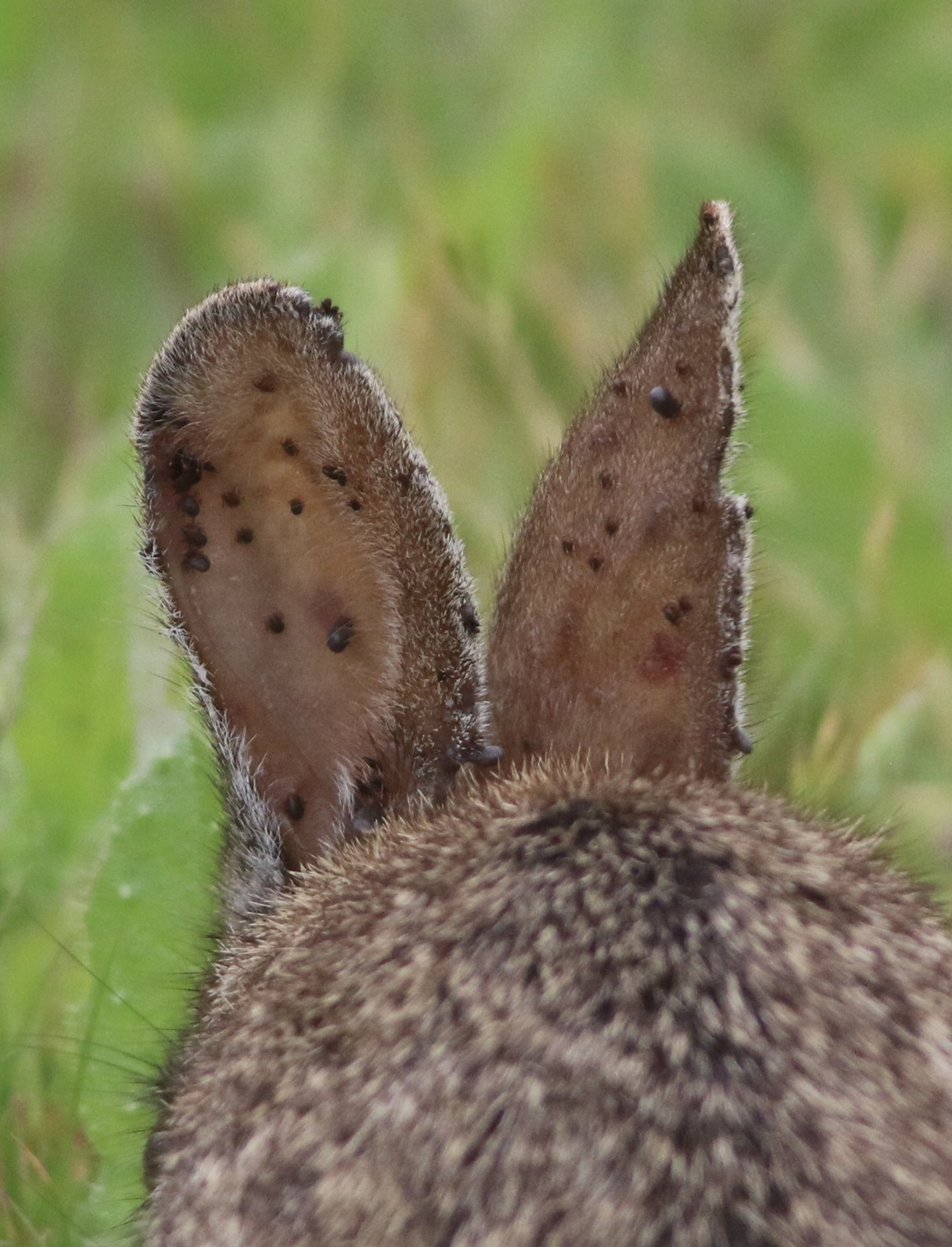
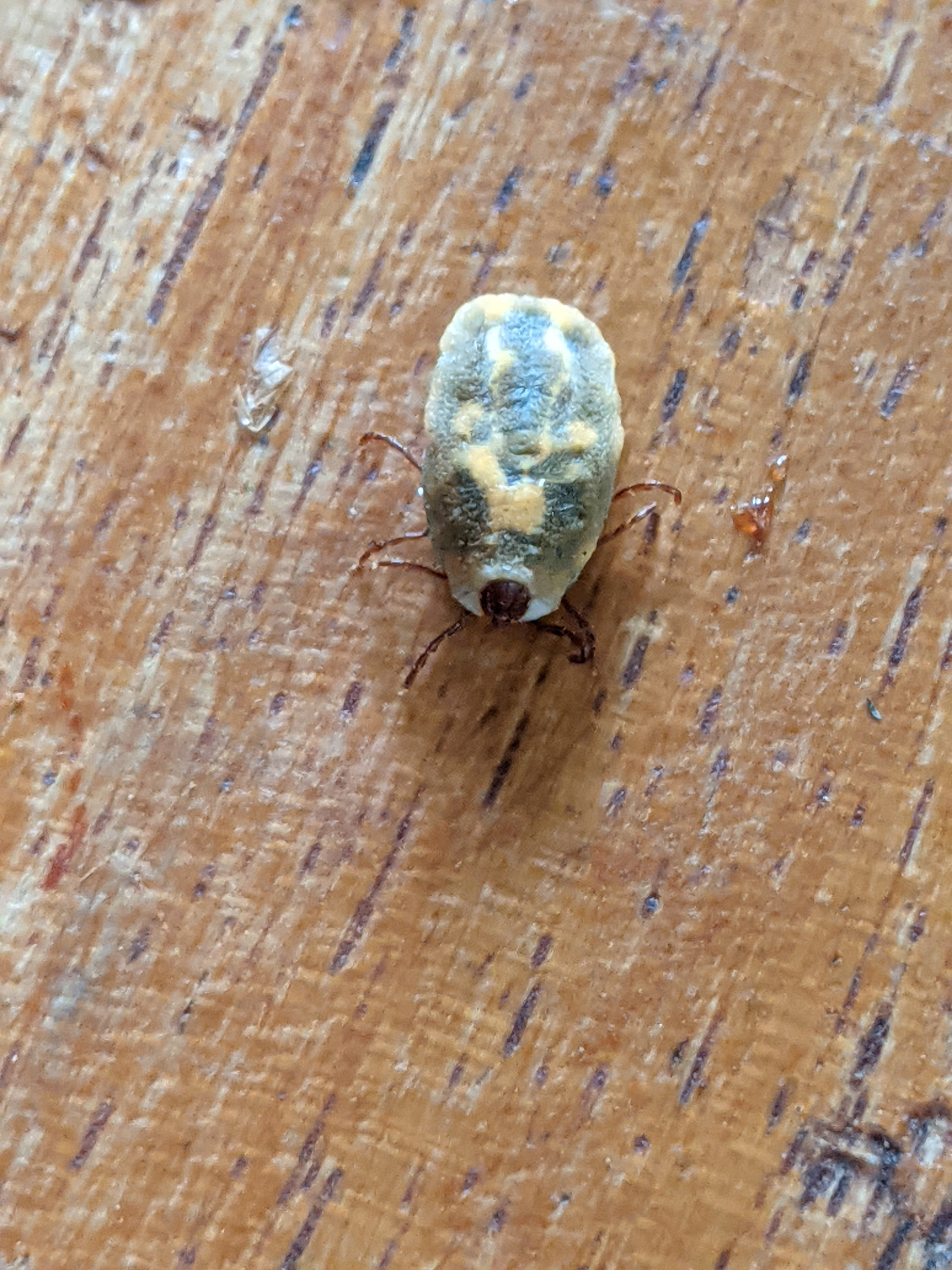
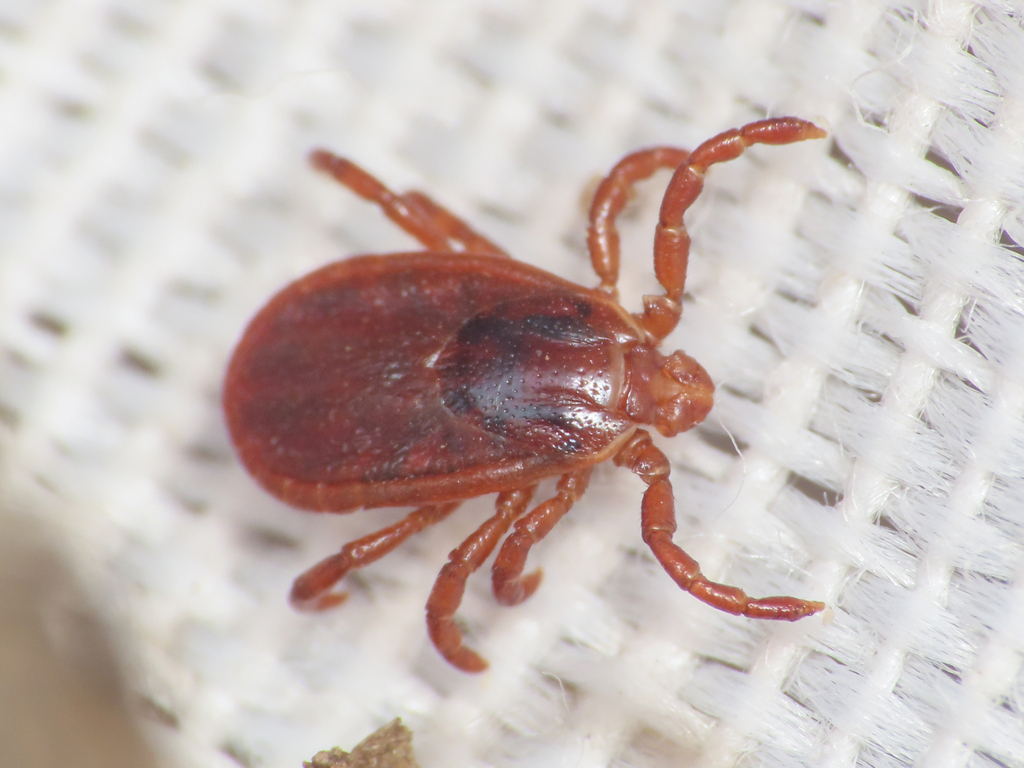
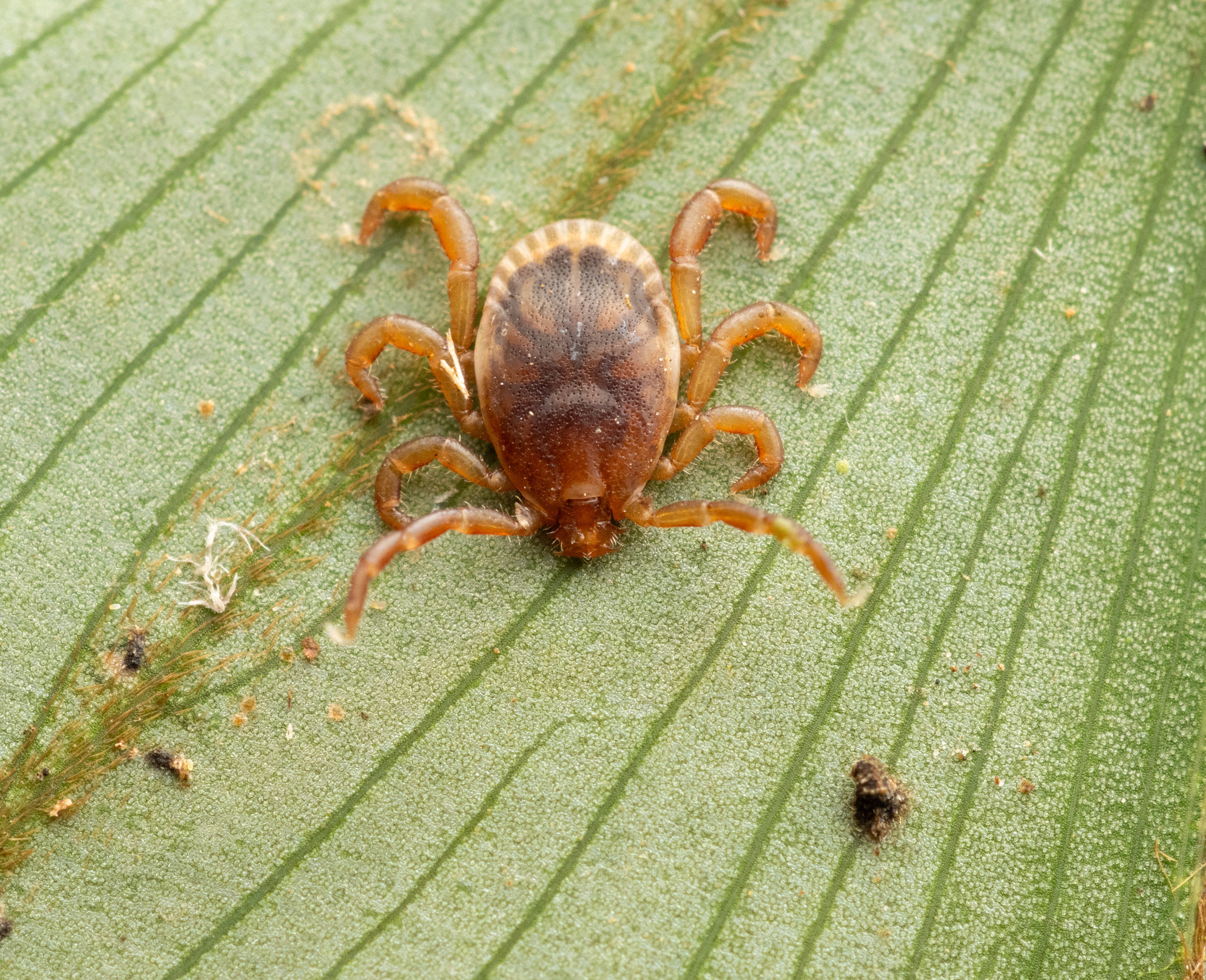
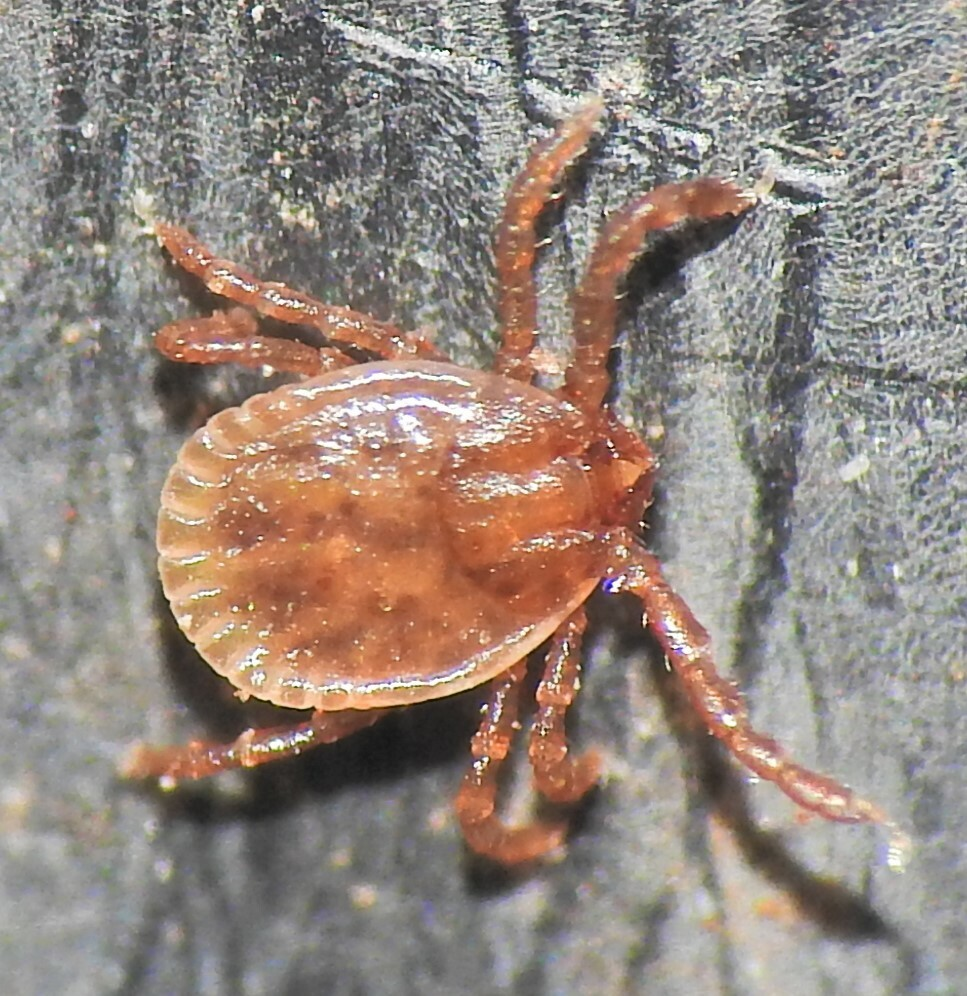
Top down, L>R: Haemaphysalis longicornis, Haemaphysalis leporispalustris, Haemaphysalis elliptica, Haemaphysalis sp., Haemaphysalis sp., Haemaphysalis bancrofti.

== Description ==
Haemaphysalis are very small, elliptical ticks. They are best distinguished by the significant lateral salience on palpal article II, which extends beyond the margin of the basis capitulum. They are eyeless, with short mouthparts.

== Taxonomy ==
Haemaphysalis contains 170 species distributed across 8 subgenera (Aboimisalis, Aborphysalis, Allophysalis, Haemaphysalis, Herpetobia, Kaiseriana, Ornithophysalis, Segalia) although the phylogeny of the genus is unresolved, with most subgenera being polyphyletic. The former subgenera Alloceraea and Sharifiella have been recently elevated to full generic genus rank.

- Ixodidae
  - - Prostriata
      Ixodes
  - Metastriata
    - Robertsicus
    - - Amblyocephalus
        - Amblyomma
        - - Dermacentor
          - - Rhipicentor
            - - Hyalomma
              - Rhipicephalus
      - Haematobothrion
        - - Cryptocroton
          - Bothriocroton
        - - Archaeocroton
          - Alloceraea
        - Haemaphysalis

Ixodidae cladogram after Barker et al., (2024)

=== Species ===
- Haemaphysalis aborensis Warburton, 1913
- Haemaphysalis aciculifer Warburton, 1913
- Haemaphysalis aculeata Lavarra, 1904
- Haemaphysalis adleri Feldman-Muhsam, 1951
- Haemaphysalis anomala Warburton, 1913
- Haemaphysalis anomaloceraea Teng, 1984 (Note: Camicas et al. (1998) list as synonym of H. shimoga, while Kolonin (2009) treats both as synonyms of H. taiwana)
- Haemaphysalis anoplos Hoogstraal, Uilenberg & Klein, 1967
- Haemaphysalis asiatica (Supino, 1897)
- Haemaphysalis atheruri Hoogstraal, Trapido & Kohls, 1965
- Haemaphysalis bancrofti Nuttall & Warburton, 1915
- Haemaphysalis bandicota Hoogstraal & Kohls, 1965
- Haemaphysalis bartelsi Schulze, 1938
- Haemaphysalis bequaerti Hoogstraal, 1956
- Haemaphysalis birmaniae Supino, 1897
- Haemaphysalis bispinosa Neumann, 1897
- Haemaphysalis bochkovi Apanaskevich & Tomlinson, 2019
- Haemaphysalis borneata Hoogstraal, 1971
- Haemaphysalis bremneri Roberts, 1963
- Haemaphysalis burkinae Apanaskevich & Tomlinson, 2019
- Haemaphysalis calcarata Neumann, 1902
- Haemaphysalis calva Nuttall & Warburton, 1915
- Haemaphysalis camicasi Tomlinson & Apanaskevich, 2019
- Haemaphysalis campanulata Warburton, 1908
- Haemaphysalis canestrinii (Supino, 1897)
- Haemaphysalis capricornis Hoogstraal, 1966
- Haemaphysalis caucasica Olenev, 1928
- Haemaphysalis celebensis Hoogstraal, Trapido & Kohls, 1965
- Haemaphysalis chordeilis (Packard, 1869)
- Haemaphysalis cinnabarina Koch, 1844 (Note: This taxon is dubious - it has been extensively confused and synonymised with Haemaphysalis chordeilis and Haemaphysalis punctata. Its hosts are unknown. Most redescriptions are unclear, mistake the species for another, or misname the species as H. cinnaberina [sic].)
- Haemaphysalis colesbergensis Apanaskevich & Horak, 2008
- Haemaphysalis concinna Koch, 1844
- Haemaphysalis cooleyi Bedford, 1929
- Haemaphysalis cornigera Neumann, 1897 (Note: This species is known in Japanese literature as Haemaphysalis ias Nakamura & Yajima, 1937)
- Haemaphysalis cornupunctata Hoogstraal & Varma, 1962
- Haemaphysalis cuspidata Warburton, 1910
- Haemaphysalis dangi Phan Trong, 1977
- Haemaphysalis danieli Černý & Hoogstraal, 1977
- Haemaphysalis darjeeling Hoogstraal & Dhanda, 1970
- Haemaphysalis davisi Hoogstraal, Dhanda & Bhat, 1970
- Haemaphysalis demidovae Emel'yanova, 1978
- Haemaphysalis doenitzi Warburton & Nuttall, 1909
- Haemaphysalis elliptica (Koch, 1844)
- Haemaphysalis elongata Neumann, 1897
- Haemaphysalis erinacei Pavesi, 1884
- Haemaphysalis eupleres Hoogstraal, Kohls & Trapido, 1965
- Haemaphysalis filippovae Bolotin, 1979 (Note: Possibly abnormal form of H. concinna (Kolonin 2009))
- Haemaphysalis flava Neumann, 1897
- Haemaphysalis formosensis Neumann, 1913
- Haemaphysalis fossae Hoogstraal, 1953
- Haemaphysalis fujisana Kitaoka, 1970
- Haemaphysalis galidiae Apanaskevich & Goodman, 2020
- Haemaphysalis garhwalensis Dhanda & Bhat, 1968
- Haemaphysalis mariae Apanaskevich, 2024
- Haemaphysalis goral Hoogstraal, 1970
- Haemaphysalis grochovskajae Kolonin, 1992
- Haemaphysalis heinrichi Schulze, 1939
- Haemaphysalis hirsuta Hoogstraal, Trapido & Kohls, 1966
- Haemaphysalis hispanica Gil Collado, 1938
- Haemaphysalis hoodi Warburton & Nuttall, 1909
- Haemaphysalis hoogstraali Kohls, 1950
- Haemaphysalis horaki Apanaskevich & Tomlinson, 2019
- Haemaphysalis houyi Nuttall & Warburton, 1915
- Haemaphysalis howletti Warburton, 1913
- Haemaphysalis humerosa Warburton & Nuttall, 1909
- Haemaphysalis hylobatis Schulze, 1933
- Haemaphysalis hyracophila Hoogstraal, Walker & Neitz, 1971
- Haemaphysalis hystricis Supino, 1897
- Haemaphysalis indica Warburton, 1910
- Haemaphysalis indoflava Dhanda & Bhat, 1968
- Haemaphysalis intermedia Warburton & Nuttall, 1909
- Haemaphysalis japonica Warburton, 1908
- Haemaphysalis juxtakochi Cooley, 1946
- Haemaphysalis kadarsani Hoogstraal & Wassef, 1977
- Haemaphysalis kashmirensis Hoogstraal & Varma, 1962
- Haemaphysalis kinneari Warburton, 1913
- Haemaphysalis knobigera Prakasan & Ramani, 2007 (Note: Taxon is ill-defined, and only considered provisionally valid.)
- Haemaphysalis koningsbergeri Warburton & Nuttall, 1909
- Haemaphysalis kopetdaghica Kerbabaev, 1962
- Haemaphysalis kumaonensis Geevarghese & Mishra, 2011
- Haemaphysalis kutchensis Hoogstraal & Trapido, 1963
- Haemaphysalis kyasanurensis Trapido, Hoogstraal & Rajagopalan, 1964
- Haemaphysalis lagostrophi Roberts, 1963
- Haemaphysalis lagrangei Larrousse, 1925
- Haemaphysalis laocayensis Phan Trong, 1977
- Haemaphysalis leachi (Audouin, 1826)
- Haemaphysalis lemuris Hoogstraal, 1953
- Haemaphysalis leporispalustris (Packard, 1869)
- Haemaphysalis lobachovi Kolonin, 1995
- Haemaphysalis longicornis Neumann, 1901
- Haemaphysalis luzonensis Hoogstraal & Parrish, 1968
- Haemaphysalis madagascariensis Colas-Belcour & Millot, 1948
- Haemaphysalis mageshimaensis Saito & Hoogstraal, 1973
- Haemaphysalis megalaimae Rajagopalan, 1963
- Haemaphysalis megaspinosa Saito, 1969
- Haemaphysalis menglaensis Pang, Chen & Xiang, 1982
- Haemaphysalis minuta Kohls, 1950
- Haemaphysalis mjoebergi Warburton, 1926
- Haemaphysalis montgomeryi Nuttall, 1912
- Haemaphysalis moreli Camicas, Hoogstraal & El Kammah, 1972
- Haemaphysalis moschisuga Teng, 1980
- Haemaphysalis muhsamae Santos Dias, 1954
- Haemaphysalis nadchatrami Hoogstraal, Trapido & Kohls, 1965
- Haemaphysalis nepalensis Hoogstraal, 1962
- Haemaphysalis nesomys Hoogstraal, Uilenberg & Klein, 1966
- Haemaphysalis norvali Hoogstraal & Wassef, 1983
- Haemaphysalis novaeguineae Hirst, 1914
- Haemaphysalis obesa Larrousse, 1925
- Haemaphysalis obtusa Dönitz, 1910
- Haemaphysalis oliveri Apanaskevich & Horak, 2008
- Haemaphysalis orientalis Nuttall & Warburton, 1915
- Haemaphysalis ornithophila Hoogstraal & Kohls, 1959
- Haemaphysalis palawanensis Kohls, 1950
- Haemaphysalis papuana Thorell, 1883
- Haemaphysalis paraleachi Camicas, Hoogstraal & El Kammah, 1983
- Haemaphysalis paraturturis Hoogstraal, Trapido & Rebello, 1963
- Haemaphysalis parmata Neumann, 1905
- Haemaphysalis parva Neumann, 1897
- Haemaphysalis pavlovskyi Pospelova-Shtrom, 1935
- Haemaphysalis pedetes Hoogstraal, 1972
- Haemaphysalis pentalagi Pospelova-Shtrom, 1935
- Haemaphysalis petrogalis Roberts, 1970
- Haemaphysalis phasiana Saito, Hoogstraal & Wassef, 1974 (Note: Possible synonym of H. doenitzi (Kolonin, 2009))
- Haemaphysalis pospelovashtromae Hoogstraal, 1966
- Haemaphysalis princeps Tomlinson & Apanaskevich, 2019
- Haemaphysalis psalistos Hoogstraal, Kohls & Parrish, 1967
- Haemaphysalis punctaleachi Camicas, Hoogstraal & El Kammah, 1973
- Haemaphysalis punctata Canestrini & Fanzago, 1878
- Haemaphysalis qinghaiensis Teng, 1980
- Haemaphysalis quadriaculeata Kolonin, 1992
- Haemaphysalis ramachandrai Dhanda, Hoogstraal & Bhat, 1970
- Haemaphysalis ratti Kohls, 1948
- Haemaphysalis renschi Schulze, 1933
- Haemaphysalis roubaudi Toumanoff, 1940
- Haemaphysalis rugosa Santos Dias, 1956
- Haemaphysalis rusae Kohls, 1950
- Haemaphysalis sambar Hoogstraal, 1971
- Haemaphysalis sciuri Kohls, 1950
- Haemaphysalis semermis Neumann, 1901
- Haemaphysalis shimoga Trapido & Hoogstraal, 1964 (Note: Treated as synonym of H. taiwana in Kolonin (2009))
- Haemaphysalis silacea Robinson, 1912
- Haemaphysalis silvafelis Hoogstraal & Trapido, 1963
- Haemaphysalis simplex Neumann, 1897
- Haemaphysalis simplicima Hoogstraal & Wassef, 1979
- Haemaphysalis sinensis Zhang, 1981
- Haemaphysalis spinigera Neumann, 1897
- Haemaphysalis spinulosa Neumann, 1906
- Haemaphysalis subelongata Hoogstraal, 1953
- Haemaphysalis subterra Hoogstraal, El Kammah & Camicas, 1992
- Haemaphysalis sulcata Canestrini & Fanzago, 1878 (Note: This taxon seems to have highly variable morphology, making it difficult to identify. Different authors depict profound differences in morphology across redescriptions, suggesting it may in fact be a species complex.)
- Haemaphysalis sumatraensis Hoogstraal, El Kammah, Kadarsan & Anastos, 1971
- Haemaphysalis sundrai Sharif, 1928
- Haemaphysalis suntzovi Kolonin, 1993
- Haemaphysalis susphilippensis Hoogstraal, Kohls & Parrish, 1968
- Haemaphysalis taiwana Sugimoto, 1936
- Haemaphysalis tauffliebi Morel, 1965
- Haemaphysalis tibetensis Hoogstraal, 1965
- Haemaphysalis tiptoni Hoogstraal, 1953
- Haemaphysalis toxopei Warburton, 1927 (Note: Kolonin (2009) treats as a synonym of H. kinneari)
- Haemaphysalis traguli Oudemans, 1928
- Haemaphysalis traubi Kohls, 1955
- Haemaphysalis turturis Nuttall & Warburton, 1915
- Haemaphysalis vasilisae Apanaskevich, 2025
- Haemaphysalis verticalis Itagaki, Noda & Yamaguchi, 1944
- Haemaphysalis vidua Warburton & Nuttall, 1909
- Haemaphysalis vietnamensis Hoogstraal & Wilson, 1966
- Haemaphysalis walkerae Apanaskevich & Tomlinson, 2019
- Haemaphysalis warburtoni Nuttall, 1912
- Haemaphysalis wellingtoni Nuttall & Warburton, 1908
- Haemaphysalis yeni Toumanoff, 1944
- Haemaphysalis zumpti Hoogstraal & El Kammah, 1974
