= Haemaphysalis kyasanurensis =

Scientific classification
- Kingdom: Animalia
- Phylum: Arthropoda
- Subphylum: Chelicerata
- Class: Arachnida
- Order: Ixodida
- Family: Ixodidae
- Genus: Haemaphysalis
- Species: H. kyasanurensis

Binomial name
- Haemaphysalis kyasanurensis Trapido, Hoogstraal & Rajagopalan, 1964

Species of tick

Haemaphysalis kyasanurensis, is a hard-bodied tick of the genus Haemaphysalis. It is found in India and Sri Lanka. It is a rare obligate ectoparasite of wild animals like Hystrix indica, and many domestic animals.
