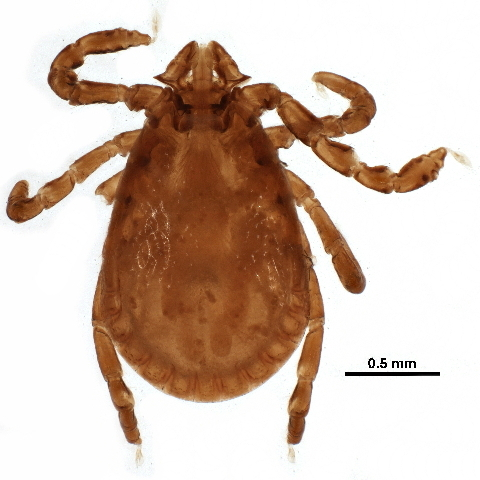

Scientific classification
- Kingdom: Animalia
- Phylum: Arthropoda
- Subphylum: Chelicerata
- Class: Arachnida
- Order: Ixodida
- Family: Ixodidae
- Genus: Haemaphysalis
- Species: H. leporispalustris

Binomial name
- Haemaphysalis leporispalustris Packard, 1869

= Haemaphysalis leporispalustris =

Species of tick

Haemaphysalis leporispalustris, the rabbit tick (occasionally known as the grouse tick), is a species of tick that is widely distributed in the Americas, stretching from Alaska to Argentina. H. leporispalustris is known to have one of the largest distributions for a tick originating in the New World. It is a three-host tick and a member of the family Ixodidae, commonly called the "hard ticks," and the genus Haemaphysalis. Its common hosts are rabbits (such as Sylvilagus spp.), hares (Lepus spp.), and sometimes ground-feeding birds. H. leporispalustris has a rigid scutum and a prominent capitulum projecting forward from its body and is often said to look like the "wood tick". It has a hemimetabolic life cycle. H. leporispalustris does not play a prominent role in disease transmission in humans but is a vector for disease in other animals.

== Morphology ==
Haemaphysalis leporispalustris is extremely similar to the 155 other members of its genus. It lacks eyes and has palpi that are wider than they are long. The scutum lacks ornamentation on both males and females. The basis of its capitulum is of rectangular shape, rather than a hexagonal shape. The adult rabbit tick is approximately 1 millimeter in length and contains festoons or wrinkles at the base of its body.

== Life cycle ==
Haemaphysalis leporispalustris has a complete lifecycle where it completes the stages of egg, larva, nymph, and adult. After emerging from the egg, the rabbit tick finds a host and takes a blood meal during each life stage. Once the tick feeds, it drops to the ground to molt and then climbs back on its host and takes another meal. The rabbit tick may change hosts throughout this process, especially if the host is not a hare or rabbit. This life cycle can take as long as a year, especially in climates that are cold. The population of H. leporispalustris peaks during the summer and declines during the winter. Development of the rabbit ticks often occur at quicker rates at higher temperatures than in colder temperatures.

== Host ==
External image
- Haemaphysalis leporispalustris, at the Department of Natural Resources of Newfoundland and Labrador, via The Internet Archive

Haemaphysalis leporispalustris commonly feeds on snowshoe hares and jackrabbits, as well as other small rabbits. Larval stages are frequently found on ground-dwelling birds. The rabbit tick rarely feeds on humans. The rabbit tick is often found on the host's ears, between them, or on their necks.

=== Selection behavior ===
The rabbit tick is extremely host specific and in its search for a host will climb onto vegetation. The tick will look for vegetation that is the height of the rabbit, 12 to 15 centimetres (4.7 to 5.9 in), and is slightly curved. The rabbit tick, in this process, is attempting to orient itself to a range where it can find rabbits, birds, and small mammals. The rabbit tick prefers surfaces with a smaller diameter near the tip of the vegetation, but the diameter of the base of the vegetation has no effect on the vegetation choice. Once it finds a suitable position, the tick will become still and stretch out its tarsi to wait for a stimuli that a host is near. The tick has the ability to sense the carbon dioxide from a potential host as well as body temperature. When the rabbit tick finds the host it will either accept the host and begin to feed or reject the host and fall to the ground, repeating the process until it finds a suitable host. This process is summed up into two parts; physical environmental stimuli and host-emitted stimuli. Also, H. leporispalustris relies heavily on light and humidity for cues of a host. The tick will look for sources that are dry and prefers darker environments.

== Veterinary importance ==
While the rabbit tick is rarely a problem with humans, its effect on small mammals (especially rabbits) is large. For instance, large infestations can lead to enlarging of red blood cells, which leads to macrocytic normochromic anemia or even death in animals.

=== Vector of disease ===
Strains of Rickettsia rickettsii, the disease aften of Rocky Mountain spotted fever have been found in the rabbit tick. The rabbit tick transmits the bacteria through transovarial transmission to its host. Evidence of this bacteria in rabbit ticks have been found in countries such as Costa Rica and Argentina. A Brazilian strain of the Rickettsia rickettsii was also found recently in Rio de Janeiro in ticks found on wild rabbits as well as rabbit ticks in Costa Rica. Since rabbit ticks support the infection of virulent strains of this bacteria, H. leporispalustris contains a role in the maintenance of R. rickettsii in the Americas. H. leporispalustris is currently one of the known vectors that is keeping this bacteria in circulation. Rabbit ticks prefer to not feed on humans so the transmission of this bacteria via rabbit ticks to humans is rare. Also, H. leporispalustris transmits Coxiella burnetii and Francisella tularensis. Strains of Anaplasma bovis have also been found in rabbit ticks, which was discovered in a Nantucket tick study of the bacteria.

=== Control ===
Ivermectin is the normal treatment for ridding rabbits and small mammals of Haemaphysalis leporispalustris. Insecticides such as pyrethrin, permethrin, and amitraz are dangerous to small mammals and must be avoided.
