= Haemaphysalis spinigera =

Scientific classification
- Domain: Eukaryota
- Kingdom: Animalia
- Phylum: Arthropoda
- Subphylum: Chelicerata
- Class: Arachnida
- Order: Ixodida
- Family: Ixodidae
- Genus: Haemaphysalis
- Species: H. spinigera

Binomial name
- Haemaphysalis spinigera Neumann, 1897

Synonyms
- Haemaphysalis (Kaiseriana) spinigera Hoogstraal & El Kammah, 1972; Haemaphysalis (Robertsalis) spinigera Santos Dias, 1963

Species of tick

Haemaphysalis spinigera, is a hard-bodied tick of the genus Haemaphysalis. It is found in India, Sri Lanka, and Vietnam. It is an obligate ectoparasite of mammals of various rodents, insectivores, and monkeys. It is a potential vector of Kyasanur Forest disease virus and Kaisodi virus.
