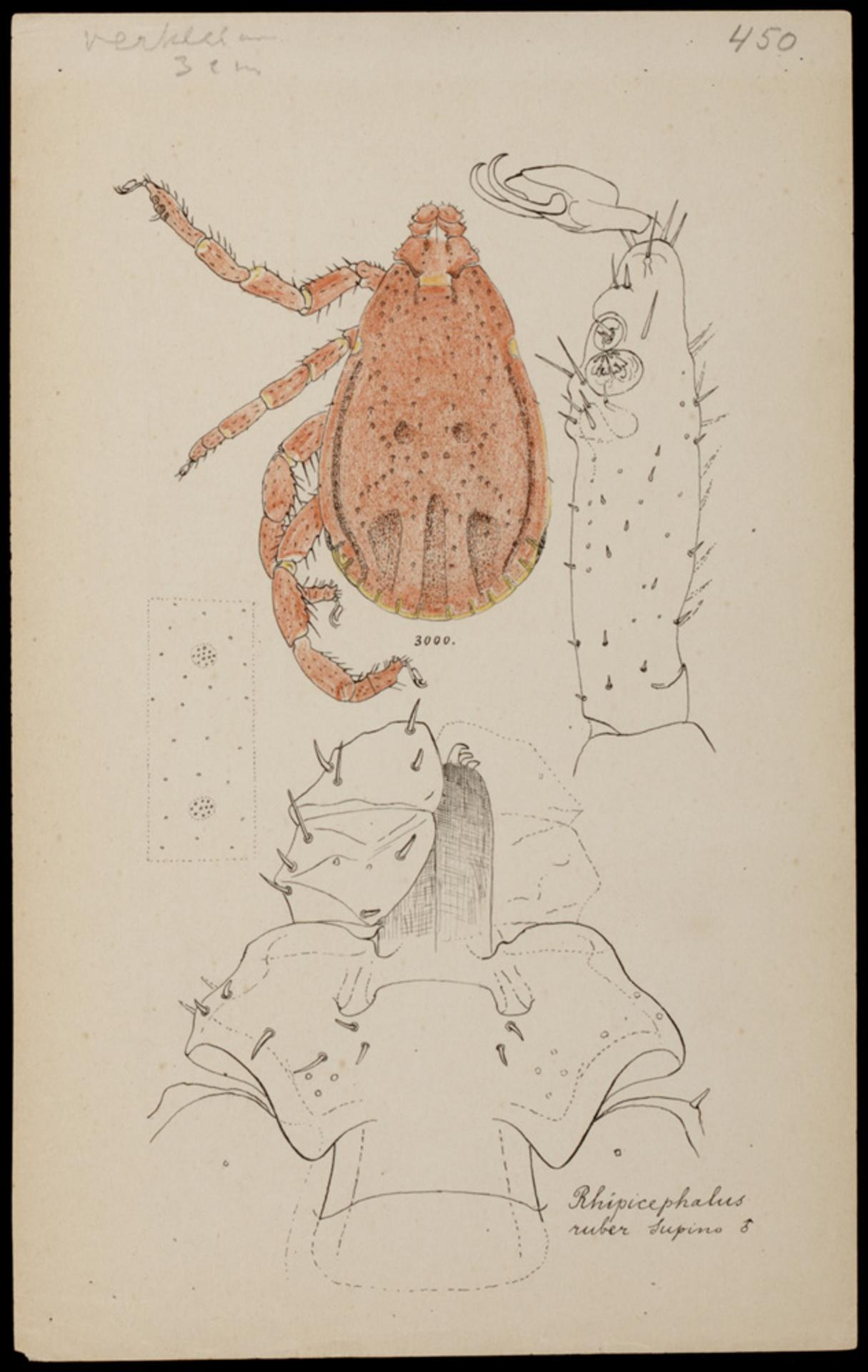

Scientific classification
- Kingdom: Animalia
- Phylum: Arthropoda
- Subphylum: Chelicerata
- Class: Arachnida
- Order: Ixodida
- Family: Ixodidae
- Genus: Rhipicephalus
- Species: R. haemaphysaloides

Binomial name
- Rhipicephalus haemaphysaloides Supino, 1897

Synonyms
- Boophilus haemaphysaloides De Blieck, 1916 (misapplied name); Rhipicephalus expeditus Luh & Woo, 1950; Rhipicephalus expeditus Nakamura & Yajima, 1937; Rhipicephalus haemaphysaloides expedita Neumann, 1897; Rhipicephalus haemaphysaloides expeditus Neumann, 1911; Rhipicephalus haemaphysaloides haemaphysaloides Supino, 1897; Rhipicephalus haemaphysaloides niger Supino, 1897 (ambiguous synonym); Rhipicephalus haemaphysaloides ruber Supino, 1897; Rhipicephalus ruber Neumann, 1897; Rhipicephalus (Eurhipicephalus) haemaphysaloides Neumann, 1904; Rhipicephalus (Rhipicephalus) haemaphysaloides Morel, 1969; Rhipicephalus (Rhipicephalus) haemaphysaloides haemaphysaloides Morel, 1969

= Rhipicephalus haemaphysaloides =

Species of tick

Rhipicephalus haemaphysaloides is a hard-bodied tick of the genus Rhipicephalus. It is one of the major medically important ticks in the world.

== Distribution ==
It is found in Indonesia, Myanmar, India, Sri Lanka, Thailand, Pakistan, and Vietnam.

== Parasitism ==
It is an obligate ectoparasite of domestic mammals such as cattle, horses, sheep, and dogs. It is a potential vector of babesiosis and human Kyasanur Forest disease. It is a three-host tick.
