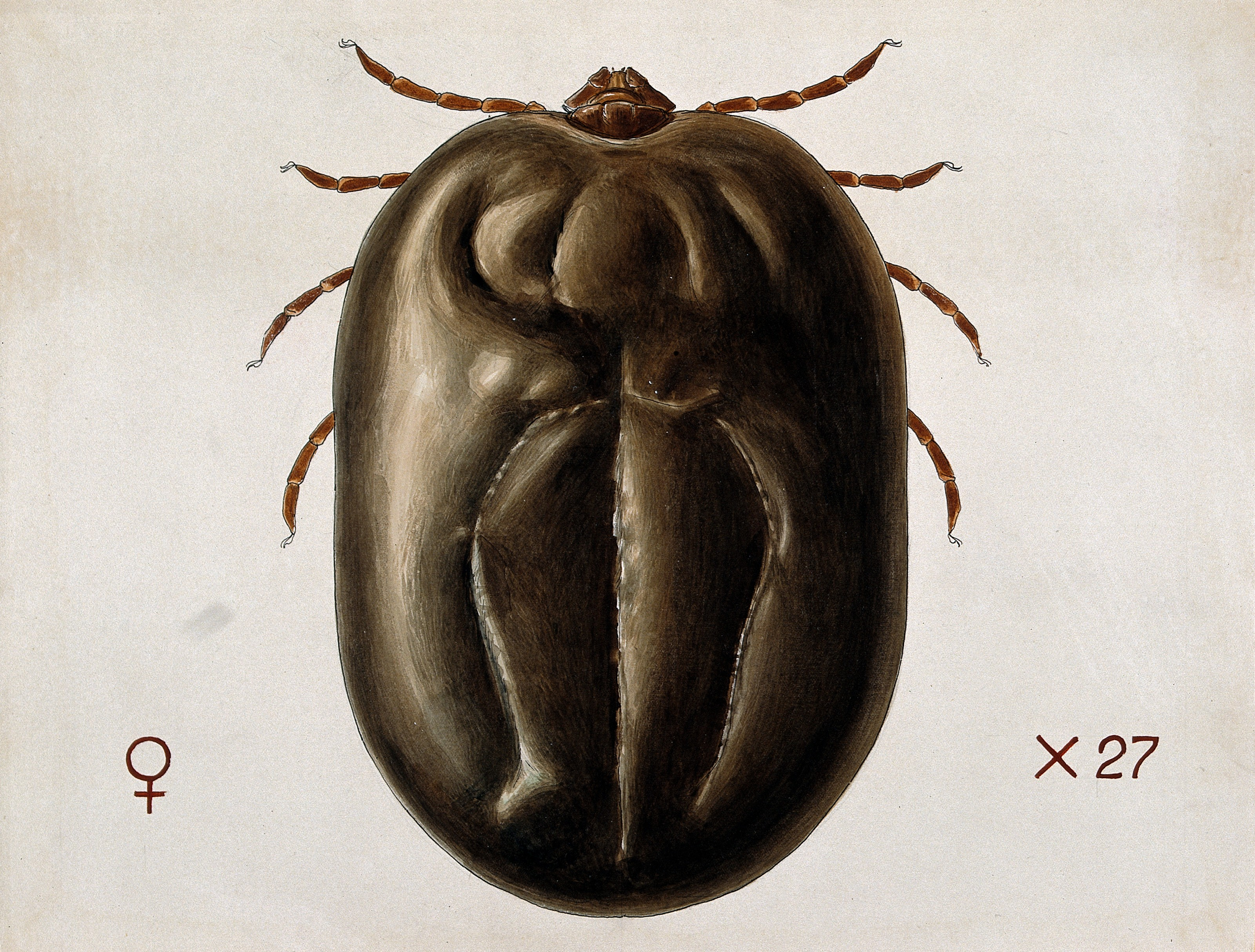

Scientific classification
- Domain: Eukaryota
- Kingdom: Animalia
- Phylum: Arthropoda
- Subphylum: Chelicerata
- Class: Arachnida
- Order: Ixodida
- Family: Ixodidae
- Genus: Haemaphysalis
- Species: H. leachi

Binomial name
- Haemaphysalis leachi Audouin, 1826

Synonyms
- Haemaphysalis humerosoides Santos Dias, 1955; Haemaphysalis leachi humerosoides Theiler, 1943; Haemaphysalis leachi leachi Neuman, 1911; Haemaphysalis leachii King, 1926; Haemaphysalis leachii humerosoides Theiler, 1962; Haemaphysalis leachii leachii Elbl & Anastos, 1966 (ambiguous synonym); Haemaphysalis leachii leachii Hoogstraal, 1958; Haemaphysalis (Feldmaniella) leachi Santos Dias, 1963; Haemaphysalis (Rhipistoma) leachi Hoogstraal, Kohls & Trapido, 19651965; Ixodes leachii Audouin, 1826; Rhipicephalus leachi Schwetz, 1927 (misapplied name); Rhipidostoma leachi Karsch, 1878; Rhipistoma leachi Neumann, 1897; Rhipistoma leachii Koch, 1844

= Haemaphysalis leachi =

Species of tick

Haemaphysalis leachi, the yellow dog tick, is a hard-bodied tick of the genus Haemaphysalis. It is also known as African dog tick, or simply as dog tick in many parts of the world.

== Distribution ==
It is rather cosmopolitan species found throughout Angola, Benin, Botswana, Burkina Faso, Burundi, Cameroon, Republic of Congo, Democratic Republic of Congo, Cote D'Ivoire, Eswatini, Ethiopia, Gabon, Gambia, Ghana, Guinea, Guinea-Bissau, India, Indonesia, Kenya, Lesotho, Liberia, Libya, Malawi, Mali, Mauritania, Mozambique, Namibia, Nigeria, Pakistan, Rwanda, Senegal, Sierra Leone, Somalia, South Africa, Sri Lanka, Sudan, Tanzania, Togo, Tunisia, Uganda, Zambia, Zimbabwe.

== Parasitism ==
It is an obligate ectoparasite of many wild and domestic mammals such as domestic and wild carnivores, small rodents, and cattle. It is also a potential vector of boutonneuse fever and canine babesiosis.

== Lifecycle ==
In the yellow dog tick's lifecycle, it attaches itself to three hosts. When the host, such as a dog, starts to scratch, the female tick starts to produce a dog-repelling allomone, which enables it to survive longer on the host.
