= Haemaphysalis aculeata =

Scientific classification
- Domain: Eukaryota
- Kingdom: Animalia
- Phylum: Arthropoda
- Subphylum: Chelicerata
- Class: Arachnida
- Order: Ixodida
- Family: Ixodidae
- Genus: Haemaphysalis
- Species: H. aculeata

Binomial name
- Haemaphysalis aculeata Lavarra, 1904

Synonyms
- Haemaphysalis longipalpis Warburton, 1910; Haemaphysalis (Kaiseriana) aculeata Hoogstraal & Kim, 1985

Species of tick

Haemaphysalis aculeata is a hard-bodied tick of the genus Haemaphysalis. It is found in India and Sri Lanka.

== Parasitism ==
Adults parasitize various mammals such as domestic cattle, buffaloes and domestic goats. It is a potential vector of Kyasanur Forest disease virus.
