= Hakea aculeata =

Column hakea

Conservation status
- Endangered (IUCN 3.1)

Scientific classification
- Kingdom: Plantae
- Clade: Tracheophytes
- Clade: Angiosperms
- Clade: Eudicots
- Order: Proteales
- Family: Proteaceae
- Genus: Hakea
- Species: H. aculeata

Binomial name
- Hakea aculeata A.S.George
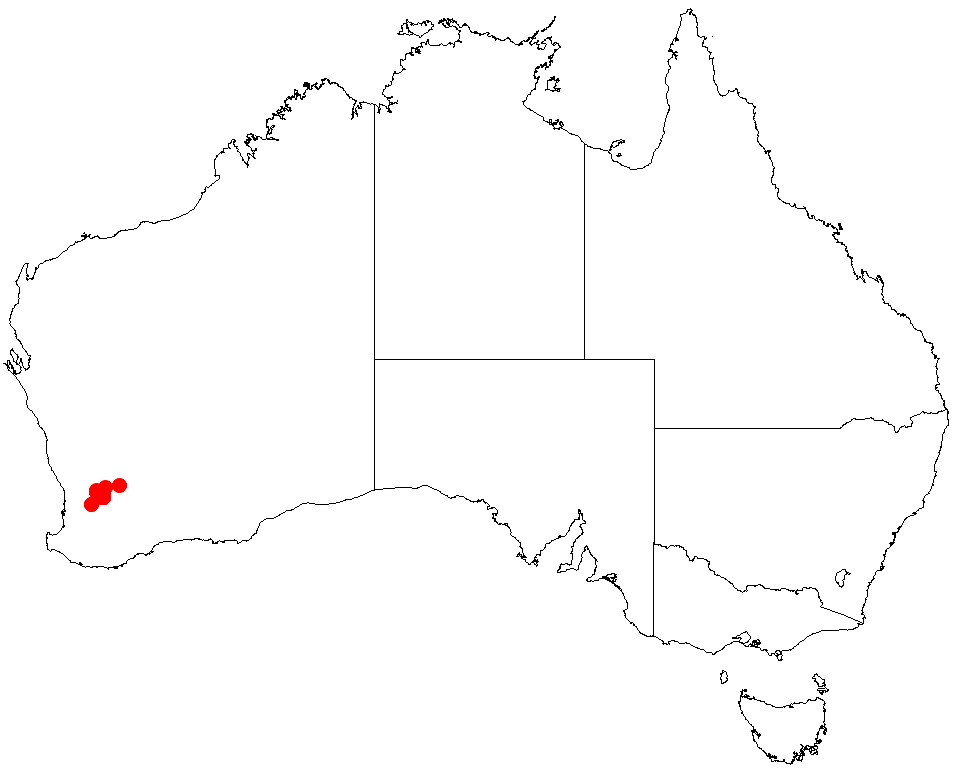
- Occurrence data from Australasian Virtual Herbarium

Species of plant found in Western Australia

Hakea aculeata, commonly known as the column hakea, is a vulnerable species of the family Proteaceae found in the Wheatbelt region of Western Australia. An unusual sculptural species with dense columns of prickly foliage and plentiful clusters of strongly scented blooms in spring.

== Description ==
Hakea aculeata is a lignotuberous multi-stemmed shrub with unusual erect columnar branches growing to 3 m (10 ft) high. The smaller branches have long soft hairs lying on the surface. The extremely prickly leaves grow alternately or arranged in a cylindrical whorl around the stem 12–50 mm (0.5–2 in) long and 3–9 mm (0.1–0.4 in) wide. Leaves are hairy and widest in the middle with a central vein ending in a sharp point at the apex 2–4 cm (0.8–2 in) long. The cream, yellow and red flowers appear in profusion in axillary clusters in the upper smaller branches. The pedicels are smooth 7–13 mm (0.3–0.5 in) long. The style 7–10 mm (0.3–0.4 in) long. Fruit are smooth 13–20 mm (0.5–0.8 in) long and 11–14 mm (0.4–0.6 in) wide with a short pointed beak.

== Taxonomy and naming ==
Hakea aculeata was first formally described in 1979 by Alex George and the description was published in Nuytsia from a specimen he collected near Cunderdin. The specific epithet (aculeata) is derived from the Latin word aculeatus meaning "prickly" or "sharp-pointed".

== Distribution and habitat ==
A rare species growing in southwestern Western Australia around Brookton, Cunderdin, Merredin, Tammin and Quairading. Hakea aculeata grows in sandy loam in heath and open scrubland. An attractive feature plant requiring a sunny aspect, good drainage and is frost and drought tolerant.

== Conservation status ==
Hakea aculeata is classified as "Threatened Flora (Declared Rare Flora — Extant)" by the Western Australian Government Department of Parks and Wildlife. An endangered species known only from about 19 populations.
