= Cecil Warburton =

Cecil Warburton (6 February 1854 – 7 October 1958) was a British zoologist, arachnologist and acarologist who worked at the Royal Agricultural Society and specialized in ticks of medical and veterinary importance.

Warburton was born at Salford, son of William, and was educated at Old Trafford and Owens College in Manchester. He went to Christ's College, Cambridge in 1886 graduating BA in 1889 and MA in 1892. He taught for some time at Old Trafford and then worked at the Royal Agricultural Society from 1893 teaching at the School of Agriculture, Cambridge. In 1909 he began to work with G. H. F. Nuttall at the Quick Laboratory in Cambridge and was a university demonstrator in medical entomology from 1912 to 1931. He moved to the Molteno Institute in 1921 along with Nuttall, collaborating with him until his death in 1937. Warburton contributed to the Cambridge Natural History volume on Arachnida. Warburton described numerous species of tick in journals. He was unmarried, and died at his home in Grantchester, Cambridge.
