= Kyasanur Forest disease =

Human disease

Kyasanur forest disease
- Other names: Monkey disease, monkey fever
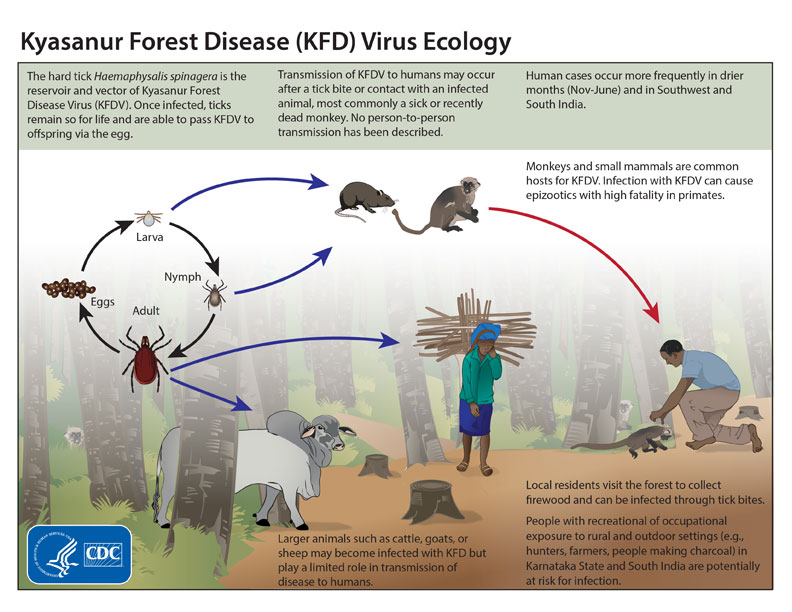
- Virus ecology
- Specialty: Infectious disease

Kyasanur forest disease (KFD) is a tick-borne viral haemorrhagic fever endemic to southwestern India. The disease is caused by a virus belonging to the family Flaviviridae. The KFD virus (KFDV) is transmitted to humans through the bite of infected hard ticks (Haemaphysalis spinigera), which act as a reservoir of KFDV.

== Signs and symptoms ==
The symptoms of the disease include a high fever with frontal headaches, chills, severe muscle pain, vomiting, and other gastrointestinal symptoms. Bleeding problems may occur 3–4 days after initial symptom onset. Patients may experience abnormally low blood pressure, and low platelet, red blood cell, and white blood cell counts. After 1–2 weeks of symptoms, some patients recover without complications. However, the illness is biphasic for a subset of patients (10–20%) who experience a second wave of symptoms at the beginning of the third week. These symptoms include fever and signs of neurological manifestations, such as severe headache, mental disturbances, tremors, and vision deficits. The convalescent period is typically very long, lasting several months. Muscle aches and weakness also occur during this period, and the patient is unable to engage in physical activities.

== Cause ==
=== Virology ===
Kyasanur Forest disease virus
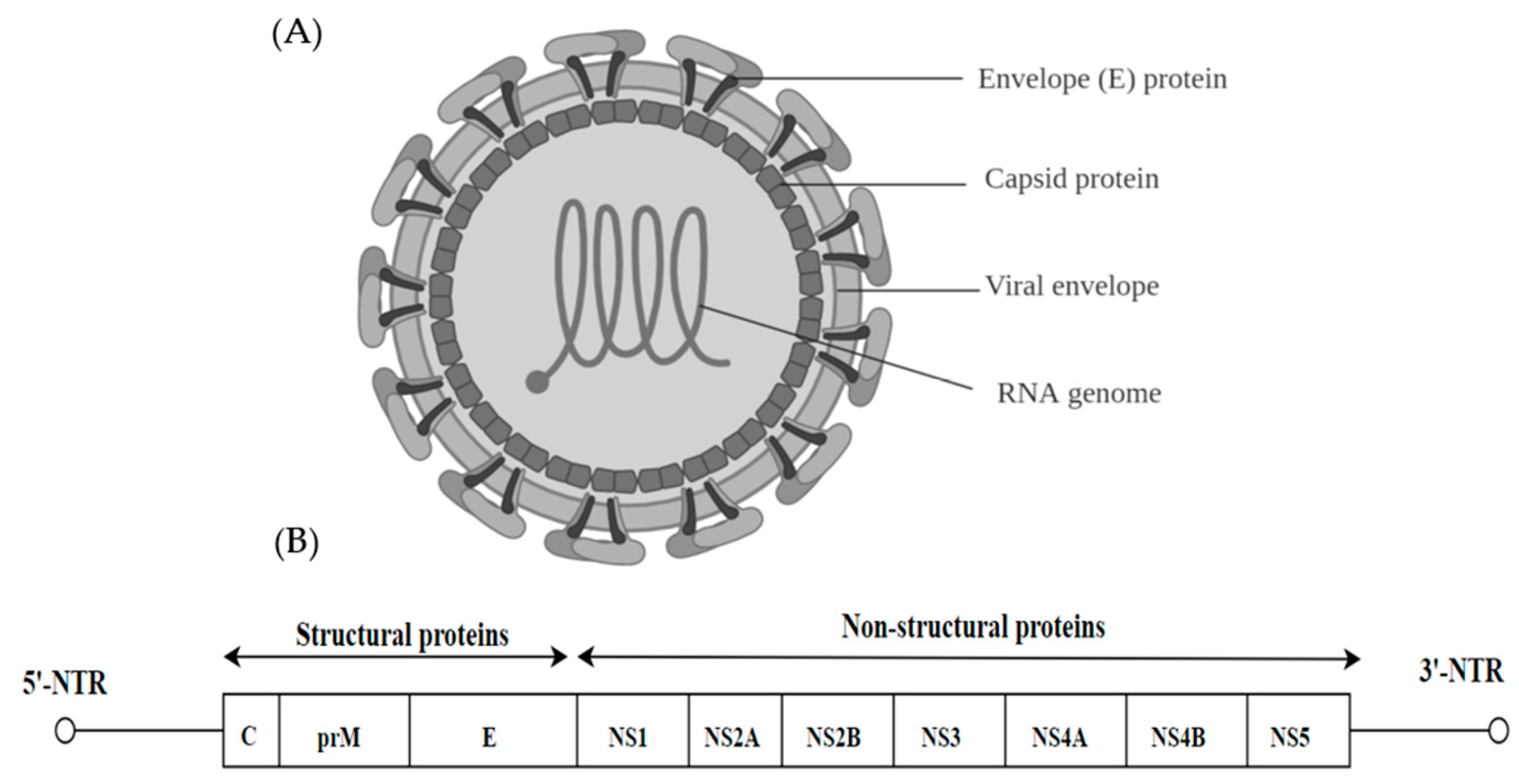
- Flavivirus structure and genome

Virus classification
- (unranked): Virus
- Realm: Riboviria
- Kingdom: Orthornavirae
- Phylum: Kitrinoviricota
- Class: Flasuviricetes
- Order: Amarillovirales
- Family: Flaviviridae
- Genus: Orthoflavivirus
- Subgenus: Euflavivirus
- Species: Orthoflavivirus kyasanurense

Synonyms
- Kyasanur Forest virus

The KFD virus is a typical flavivirus measuring about 40–60 nm in diameter. The genome of KFDV consists of 10,774 nucleotides of single-stranded, positive-sense RNA encoding a single polyprotein that is cleaved post-translationally into three structural (C, prM/M and E) and seven non-structural (NS1, NS2a, NS2b, NS3, NS4a, NS4b and NS5) proteins. The genome of KFDV is very similar (>92% homologous) to that of Alkhurma Hemorrhagic Fever Virus which is primarily found in Saudi Arabia. These two species both belong to the family Flaviviridae and diverged over 700 years ago and have thus remained geographically separated.

=== Transmission ===
A variety of animals are thought to be reservoir hosts for the disease, including porcupines, rats, squirrels, mice, and shrews. Monkeys are the main amplifying hosts for KFD virus, and they are also affected by the virus. The surili Presbytis entellus and the bonnet macaque are very susceptible to the KFD virus. They develop tremendous viremia and infect the ticks. The vector for disease transmission is Haemaphysalis spinigera, a forest tick. Humans contract infection from the bite of nymphs of the tick. Man is a terminal host, and there is no human-to-human transmission because the human domestic environment does not sustain the ticks.

== Pathology ==
The pathogenesis of KFDV is not completely understood. Research using mouse models found that KFDV primarily replicates in the brain. Other research has expanded on this by described neurological changes that occurred within infected organisms. This experiment was completed by using KFDV-infected mice and discovered that KFDV caused gliosis, inflammation, and cell death in the brain. They posited that KFDV could be primarily a neuropathic disease and other symptoms are due to this pathogenesis.

== Diagnosis ==
In earlier days, suspected cases were confirmed in a laboratory by serum inoculation into suckling mice (Swiss Albino mice), and subsequent death of mice was labeled as KFD-positive cases. Other methods of diagnosis included hemagglutination inhibition (HI), complement fixation, neutralization tests. However, new research has introduced more efficient molecular-based methods to diagnose KFDV. These methods include: RT-PCR, nested RT-PCR, TaqMan-based real-time RT-PCR, Immunoglobin M antibodies, and Immunoglobin G detection by ELISA. The two methods involving RT-PCR can function by attaching a primer to the NS-5 gene, which is highly conserved among the genus to which KFDV belongs. PCR positivity is limited to 8–10 days from the onset of symptoms. The ELISA-based methods allow for the detection of anti-KFDV antibodies in patients typically from the 5th day of onset of symptoms up to 3 months.

== Prevention and treatment ==
Prevention is by vaccination, as well as preventive measures such as protective clothing and tick population control. The vaccine for KFDV consists of formalin-inactivated KFDV. The vaccine has a 62.4% effectiveness rate for individuals who receive two doses. For individuals who receive an additional dose, the effectiveness increases to 82.9%. Specific antiviral treatments are not available as of 2022.

== Risk factors and risk groups ==
Kyassanur forest disease spreads in places where humans interact with wildlife, especially villages adjoining forest areas and inter-state borders. People who frequently visit the forest areas of the Western Ghats and who refuse the KFD vaccination have a high risk of acquiring KFD infection.

== Ecology and One Health surveillance ==
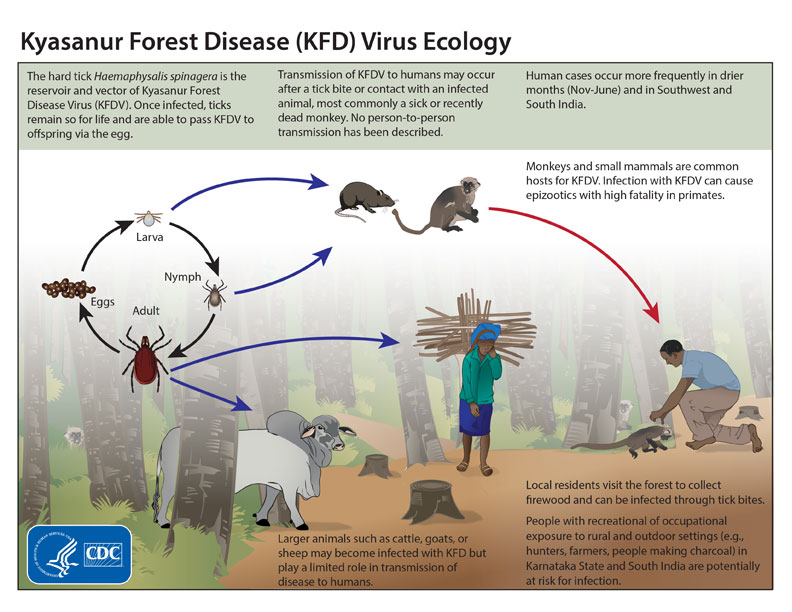
Ecology of Kyasanur Forest disease virus, illustrating interactions among tick vectors, animal hosts and humans.

Environmental and land-use changes have been associated with the distribution of Kyasanur Forest disease (KFD). A spatial analysis of 47 outbreaks in the Western Ghats between 2012 and 2019 found that forest loss was associated with increased KFD outbreak risk (relative risk 1.83, 95% confidence interval 1.33–2.51). Mammalian species richness was also associated with increased risk.

A review of KFD identified deforestation, forest fragmentation and increased human activity within wildlife habitats as factors associated with its geographical expansion beyond its historical focus in Karnataka. These ecological changes can alter opportunities for contact among humans, wildlife and tick vectors.

Surveillance of KFD can incorporate human cases, tick populations and non-human primates. A systematic review and meta-analysis of studies published between 2000 and early 2025 detected KFD virus in 116 of 3,466 tested tick pools. Haemaphysalis spinigera and Haemaphysalis turturis predominated among positive pools. The review described monkeys as potentially contributing to the establishment of new disease foci, while ticks play an important role in maintaining transmission, and recommended intensified surveillance in emerging areas.

An evaluation of the KFD surveillance system in Shivamogga district, Karnataka, identified gaps in coordination between human, animal and entomological surveillance. Reported weaknesses included the absence of animal and entomological surveillance line lists, non-standardized reporting of suspected human cases, delays in laboratory testing and limited systematic data sharing. The authors recommended integrating a One Health approach with clearly defined responsibilities among participating sectors.

== History ==
The disease was first reported from Kattinakere village forest, which is in the Kyasanur forest range of Karnataka in India in March 1957. When the officials visited the Kattinakere forest and discovered the diseases, they noticed a signboard informing them that this was the Kyasanur forest range. Hence the name. The disease first manifested as an epizootic outbreak among monkeys, killing several of them in the year 1957. Hence, the disease is also locally known as "monkey disease" or "monkey fever". The similarity with Russian spring-summer encephalitis was noted by the British neurovirologist Hubert Webb, and the possibility of migratory birds carrying the disease was raised. Studies began to look for the possible species that acted as reservoirs for the virus and the agents responsible for transmission. Subsequent studies failed to find any involvement of migratory birds, although the possibility of their role in initial establishment was not ruled out. The virus was found to be quite distinctive and not closely related to the Russian virus strains. Antigenic relatedness is, however, close to many other strains, including the Omsk hemorrhagic fever (OHF), and birds from Siberia have been found to show an antigenic response to KFD virus. Sequence based studies note the distinctiveness of OHF. Early studies in India were conducted in collaboration with the US Army Medical Research Unit and this led to controversy and conspiracy theories.

Subsequent studies based on sequencing found that the Alkhurma virus found in Saudi Arabia is closely related. In 1989, a patient in Nanjianin, China was found with fever symptoms, and in 2009, its viral gene sequence was found to exactly match that of the KFD reference virus of 1957. This has been questioned, though, since the Indian virus shows variations in sequence over time, and the exact match with the virus sequence of 1957 and the Chinese virus of 1989 is not expected. This study also found, using immune response tests, that birds and humans in the region appeared to have been exposed to the virus. Another study has suggested that the virus is recent in origin dating the nearest common ancestor of it and related viruses to around 1942, based on the estimated rate of sequence substitutions. The study also raises the possibility of bird involvement in long-distance transfer. It appears that these viruses diverged 700 years ago.

A recent outbreak in 2020 claimed two lives in Siddapura, Karnataka. The peak season for this disease in Malnad is from March till May, but has been observed to peak earlier in the year as well. There were a total of 55 reported cases in Shivamogga district, Karntaka.

== Affected states in India ==
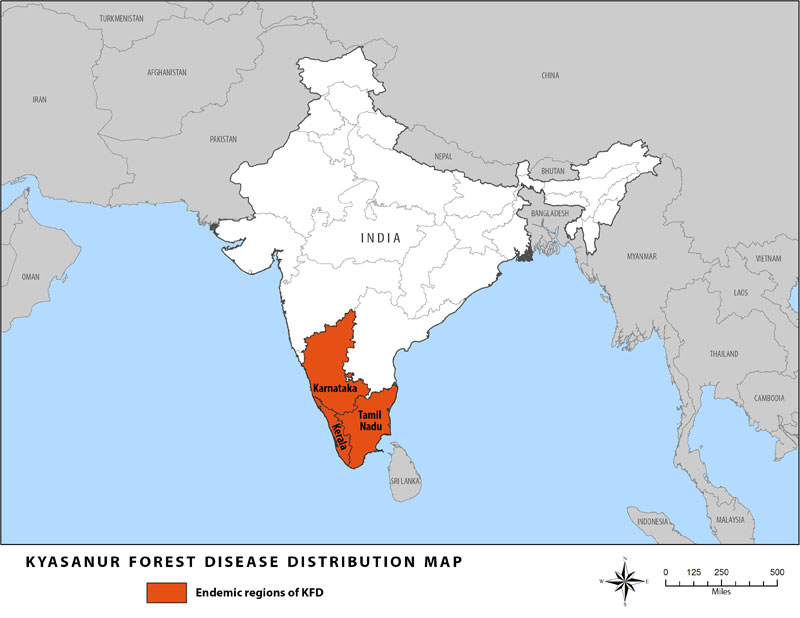
Disease distribution

The disease was initially reported from the Shimoga district of Karnataka, which is a primitive sylvan territory in the Western Ghats of India. The disease spread to other districts of Karnataka, involving districts of Chikkamagalore, Uttara Kannada, Dakshina Kannada, Udupi, Chamarajanagar (2012), and Belagavi (2016). In 2013, KFDV was detected in monkey autopsies from the Nilgiris district of Tamil Nadu state. Monkey deaths and human cases have now been reported from three neighbouring states bordering Karnataka, i.e., Wayanad (2013) and Malappuram districts of Kerala (2014), North Goa district of Goa state (2015), and Sindhudurg district of Maharashtra (2016).

== Serological evidence for KFD ==
There are reported serological evidence for KFD detected in humans in other parts of India, namely Kutch and Saurashtra regions of Gujarat state, Kingaon and Parbatpur of West Bengal state. A seroprevalence study in Andaman and Nicobar islands in 2002 revealed a high prevalence of hemagglutination inhibition (HI) antibodies against KFDV.

== Epidemiology ==
The disease has a fatality rate of 3-10%, and it affects 400-500 people annually.

The disease was first noted at Kyasanur village near Sagar in Shivamogga district of Karnataka. The virus has been detected in monkeys in parts of Bandipur National Park (Chamarajnagar) and parts of the Nilgiris. Human infection occurred in Bandipur through handling of dead monkeys that were infected. A human carrier was also detected in Wayanad (Kerala). The disease has shown its presence in the adjacent states of Karnataka including Kerala, Maharashtra, Goa, Tamil Nadu and Gujarat.
