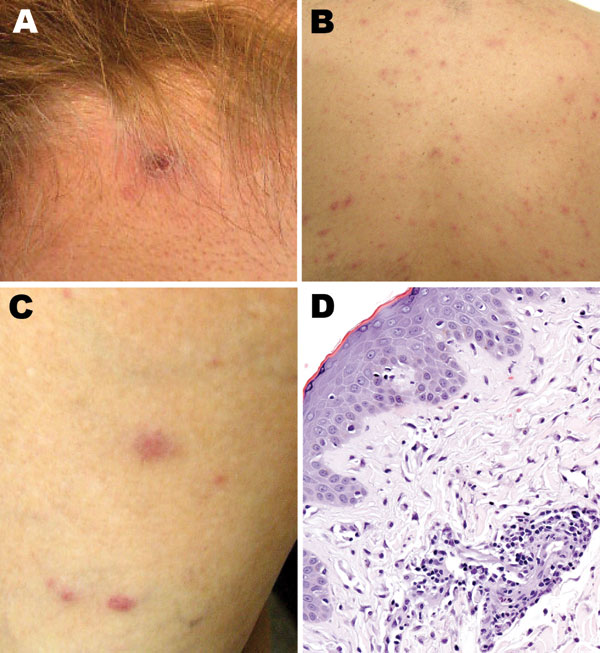
- Rickettsia parkeri rickettsiosis skin lesions: A – eschar after tick bite on neck; B, C – papulovesicular rash on back and leg; D – micrograph of biopsy specimen

Scientific classification
- Domain: Bacteria
- Kingdom: Pseudomonadati
- Phylum: Pseudomonadota
- Class: Alphaproteobacteria
- Order: Rickettsiales
- Family: Rickettsiaceae
- Genus: Rickettsia
- Species group: Spotted fever group
- Species: R. parkeri

Binomial name
- Rickettsia parkeri Lackman et al., 1965

= Rickettsia parkeri =

Species of bacterium

Rickettsia parkeri (abbreviated R. parkeri) is a gram-negative intracellular bacterium. The organism is found in the Western Hemisphere and is transmitted via the bite of hard ticks of the genus Amblyomma. R. parkeri causes mild spotted fever disease in humans, whose most common signs and symptoms are fever, an eschar at the site of tick attachment, rash, headache, and muscle aches. Doxycycline should be given after any tick bite especially those occurring on children.

== Biology ==
R. parkeri is classified in the spotted fever group of the genus Rickettsia. Genetically, its close relatives include R. africae, R. sibirica, R. conorii, R. rickettsii, R. peacockii, and R. honei.

The organism has been isolated from numerous species of ticks in the genus Amblyomma: A. americanum in the United States; A. aureolatum in Brazil; A. maculatum in Mexico, Peru, and the United States; A. nodosum in Brazil; A. ovale in Brazil and Mexico; A. parvitarsum in Argentina and Chile; A. tigrinum in Argentina, Bolivia, Brazil, and Uruguay; and A. triste in Argentina, Brazil, the United States, and Uruguay. Different ticks may carry different strains of the organism. R. parkeri sensu stricto ("in the strict sense") is found in A. maculatum and A. triste; R. parkeri strain NOD, in A. nodosum; R. parkeri strain Parvitarsum, in A. parvitarsum; and R. parkeri strain Atlantic rainforest, in A. aureolatum and A. ovale.

== Human infections ==
The first report of a confirmed human case of infection with R. parkeri was published in 2004. The person was infected in the state of Virginia in the United States. Other confirmed or probable human cases have been reported to have acquired infection elsewhere in the United States (e.g., Arizona, Georgia, and Mississippi), as well as in Argentina, Brazil, Colombia, Mexico, and Uruguay. Terms used to describe human infection with R. parkeri include "American boutonneuse fever" because of its similarity to boutonneuse fever caused by Rickettsia conorii; "American tick bite fever" because of its similarity to African tick bite fever caused by Rickettsia africae; "Tidewater spotted fever," after the Tidewater region in the eastern United States; and "Rickettsia parkeri rickettsiosis" or "R. parkeri rickettsiosis."

=== Epidemiology ===
Of all human cases documented in the medical literature, 87% were 18–64 years of age, and most cases were male. Brazil, Argentina, and the United States accounted for the majority of cases in the medical literature. In the United States, most of the 40 cases reported to the Centers for Disease Control and Prevention (CDC) as of 2016 became infected between the months of July and September.

=== Diagnosis ===
The CDC recommends polymerase chain reaction (PCR) of a biopsy or swab of an eschar, or PCR of a biopsy of a rash, for diagnosis of R. parkeri infection. In addition, indirect immunofluorescence antibody (IFA) assays using paired acute and convalescent sera can be used.

=== Clinical manifestations ===
A 2008 study compared 12 R. parkeri cases with 208 Rocky Mountain spotted fever cases caused by R. rickettsii. Although both R. parkeri and R. rickettsii caused fever, rash, myalgia, and headache, R. parkeri caused eschars and R. rickettsii did not. Furthermore, the percentage of patients hospitalized was lower for R. parkeri than for R. rickettsii (33% vs 78%), and R. parkeri led to no deaths while R. rickettsii led to death in 7% of cases.

A 2021 systematic review of 32 confirmed and 45 probable cases of human infection with R. parkeri determined that 94% of the confirmed cases had fever, 91% an eschar, 72% a rash, 56% headache, and 56% myalgia, with similar percentages among the probable cases. The rash was most frequently described as papular or macular. Among the confirmed and probable cases, the most common treatment was doxycycline, followed by tetracycline. Although 9% of all the cases were hospitalized, there was a "100% rate of clinical recovery."

== History ==
In 1939, Ralph R. Parker, director of the Rocky Mountain Laboratory, and others published a paper on "a rickettsia-like infectious agent." The agent, found in Amblyomma maculatum ticks collected from cows in Texas, produced mild disease in guinea pigs. In 1965, Lackman and others named the rickettsial organism R. parkeri after Parker.
