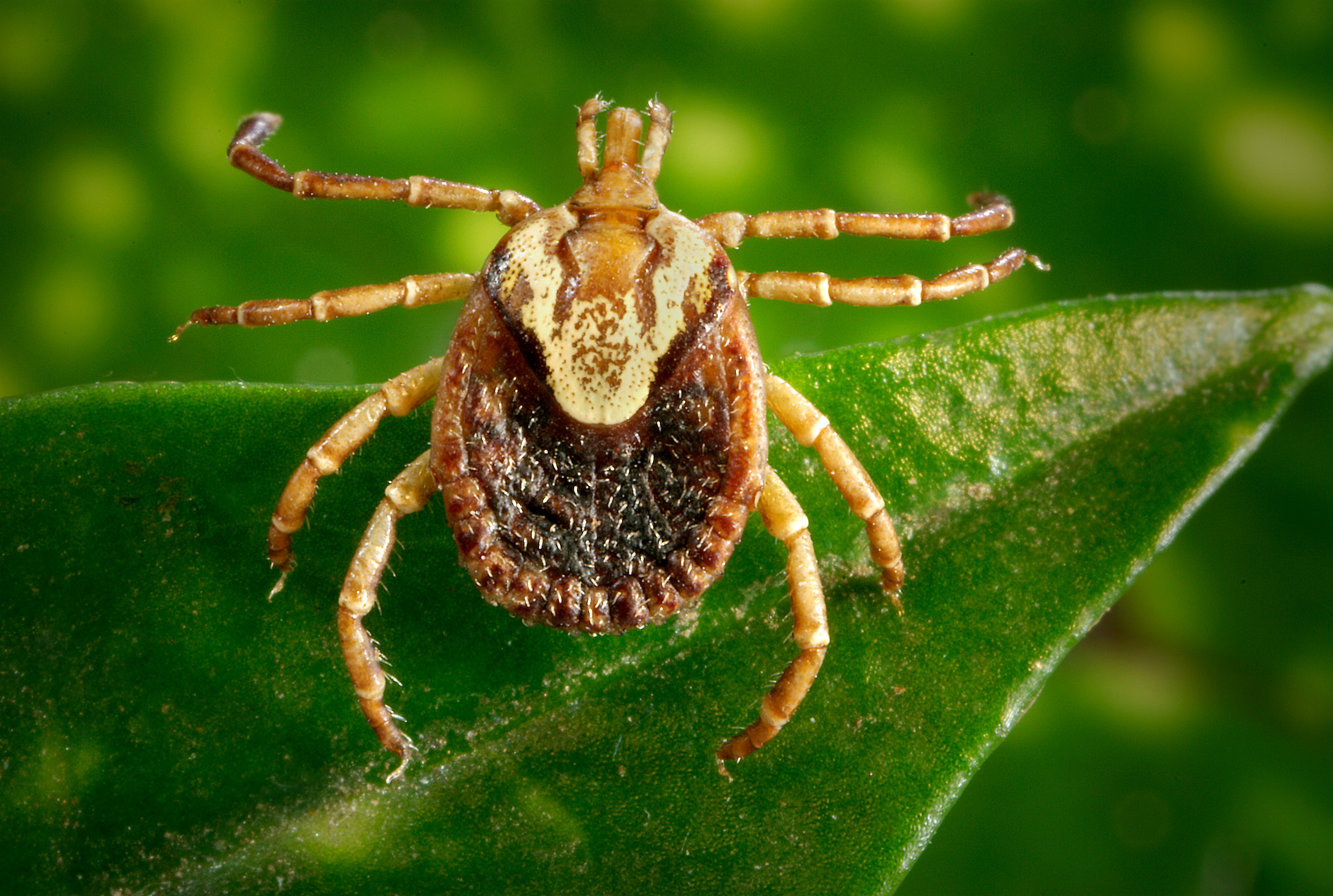

Scientific classification
- Kingdom: Animalia
- Phylum: Arthropoda
- Subphylum: Chelicerata
- Class: Arachnida
- Order: Ixodida
- Family: Ixodidae
- Genus: Amblyomma
- Species: A. cajennense

Binomial name
- Amblyomma cajennense (Fabricius, 1787)

= Amblyomma cajennense =

Species of tick

Amblyomma cajennense or Cayenne tick is a species of tick found in a range from the southern part of the United States to northern Argentina, through Central America and some of the Caribbean. As a consequence, the species has adapted to a wide range of environmental conditions. There are also major geographic barriers such as large rivers and the Andes mountain range.

Debate exists over whether A. cajennense is a single species or a complex of species. In the 1930s, Maria Tonelli-Rondelli proposed that the morphological variation within the species indicated that it was a complex, while in the 1950s, this variation was proposed to be due to normal variation between individuals of one species. Molecular biological analyses have indicated that A. cajennense is a complex of species.

A 2014 study asserts that Amblyomma cajennense s.s. is found only in the Amazonian region of South America, whereas the species reported from the northern part of the Inter-Andean valley of Peru is A. interandinum, the species present from Texas to western Ecuador is A. mixtum, the species that occurs in the Eastern Cordillera of Colombia is A. patinoi, the species associated with the dry areas of the Chaco region spanning from central-northern Argentina to Bolivia and Paraguay is A. tonelliae, and the species distributed from the humid areas of northern Argentina to the contiguous regions of Bolivia and Paraguay and the coastal and central-western states of Brazil is A. sculptum.

== Medical significance ==
A. cajenennense can transmit Rocky Mountain spotted fever. It affects humans and their domestic cattle.

In August 2009, Brazilian researchers announced that a protein called Factor X active found in the saliva of the tick proved effective in stopping the growth of certain cancer cells in laboratory mice.
