= African tick bite fever =

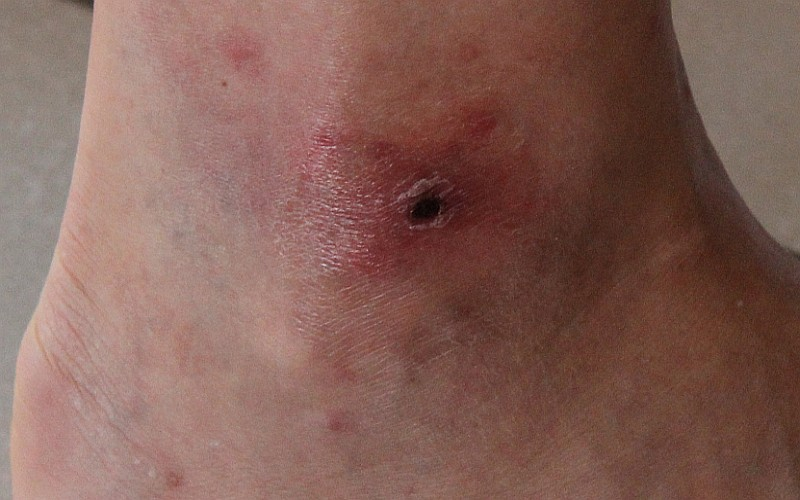
- Leg lesion from a Rickettsia africae infection
- Specialty: Infectious disease
- Symptoms: Fever, headache, muscles pains, rash
- Complications: Rare (joint inflammation)
- Usual onset: 4–10 days after the bite
- Causes: Rickettsia africae spread by ticks
- Diagnostic method: Based on symptoms, confirmed by culture, PCR, or immunofluorescence
- Prevention: Avoiding tick bites
- Medication: Doxycycline, chloramphenicol, azithromycin
- Prognosis: Good
- Frequency: Relatively common among travelers to sub-Saharan Africa
- Deaths: None reported

African tick bite fever (ATBF) is a bacterial infection spread by the bite of a tick. Symptoms may include fever, headache, muscle pain, and a rash. At the site of the bite there is typically a red skin sore with a dark center. The onset of symptoms usually occurs 4–10 days after the bite. Complications are rare but may include joint inflammation. Some people do not develop symptoms.

Tick bite fever is caused by the bacterium Rickettsia africae. The bacterium is spread by ticks of the Amblyomma type. These generally live in tall grass or bush rather than in cities. The diagnosis is typically based on symptoms. It can be confirmed by culture, PCR, or immunofluorescence.

There is no vaccine. Prevention is by avoiding tick bites by covering the skin, using DEET, or using permethrin treated clothing. Evidence regarding treatment, however, is limited. The antibiotic doxycycline appears useful. Chloramphenicol or azithromycin may also be used. The disease will also tend to resolve without treatment.

The disease occurs in sub-Saharan Africa, the West Indies, and Oceania. It is relatively common among travelers to sub-Saharan Africa. Most infections occur between November and April. Outbreaks of the disease may occur. The earliest descriptions of the condition are believed to be from 1911. African tick bite fever is a type of spotted fever. It has previously been confused with Mediterranean spotted fever.

== Signs and symptoms ==
African tick bite fever is often asymptomatic or mild in clinical presentation and complications are rare. The onset of illness is typically 5–7 days after the tick bite, although in some cases it may take up to 10 days for symptoms to occur. Symptoms can persist for several days to up to three weeks. Common presenting symptoms include:

- Fever
- Headache
- Muscle aches
- Inoculation eschar, which is dead, often black, tissue around a bite site (see photo above)
  - Eschars may or may not be present. Amblyomma ticks actively attack cattle or humans and can bite more than once. In African tick bite fever, unlike what is typically seen with other Rickettsial spotted fevers when only one eschar is identified, multiple eschars may be seen and are considered pathognomonic.
- Swollen lymph nodes near the site of the bite
- Maculopapular and/or vesicular rash

=== Complications ===
Complications are rare and are not life-threatening. No deaths due to African tick bite fever have been reported. Reported complications include:

- Prolonged fever > 3 weeks in duration
- Reactive arthritis
- Moderate to severe headache

== Cause ==
=== Bacteriology ===
Rickettsia africae is a gram-negative, obligate intracellular, pleomorphic bacterium. It belongs to the genus Rickettsia, which includes many bacterial species that are transmitted to humans by arthropods.

=== Vectors ===
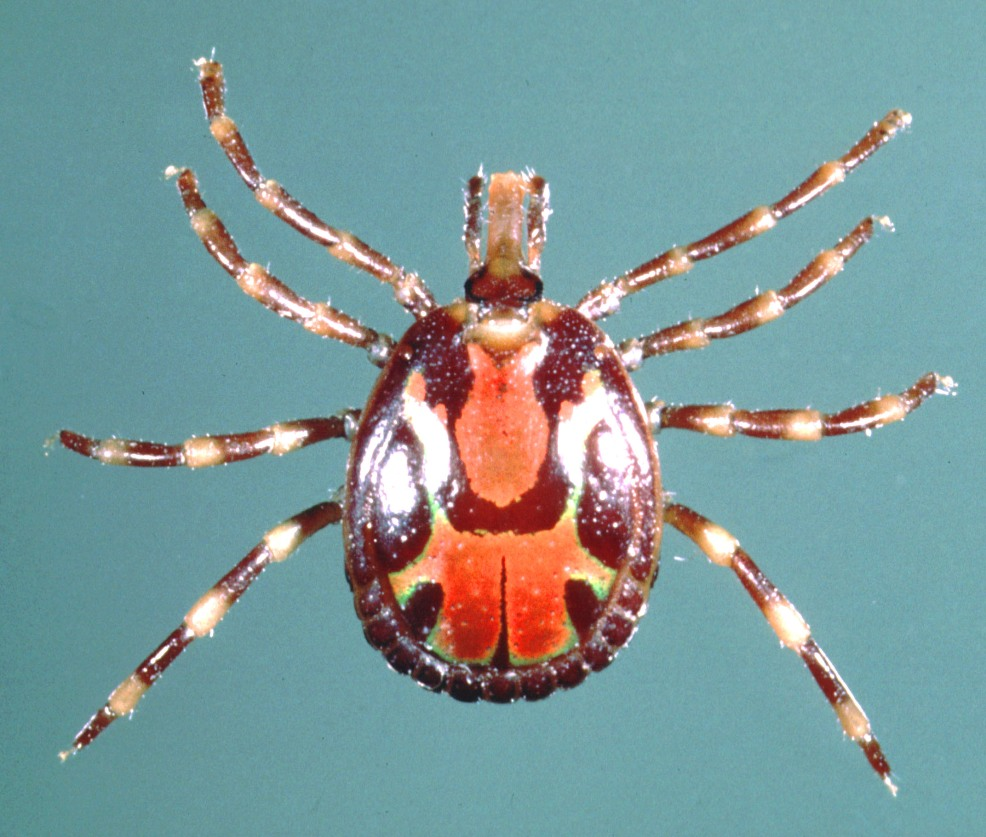
Amblyomma variegatum, male

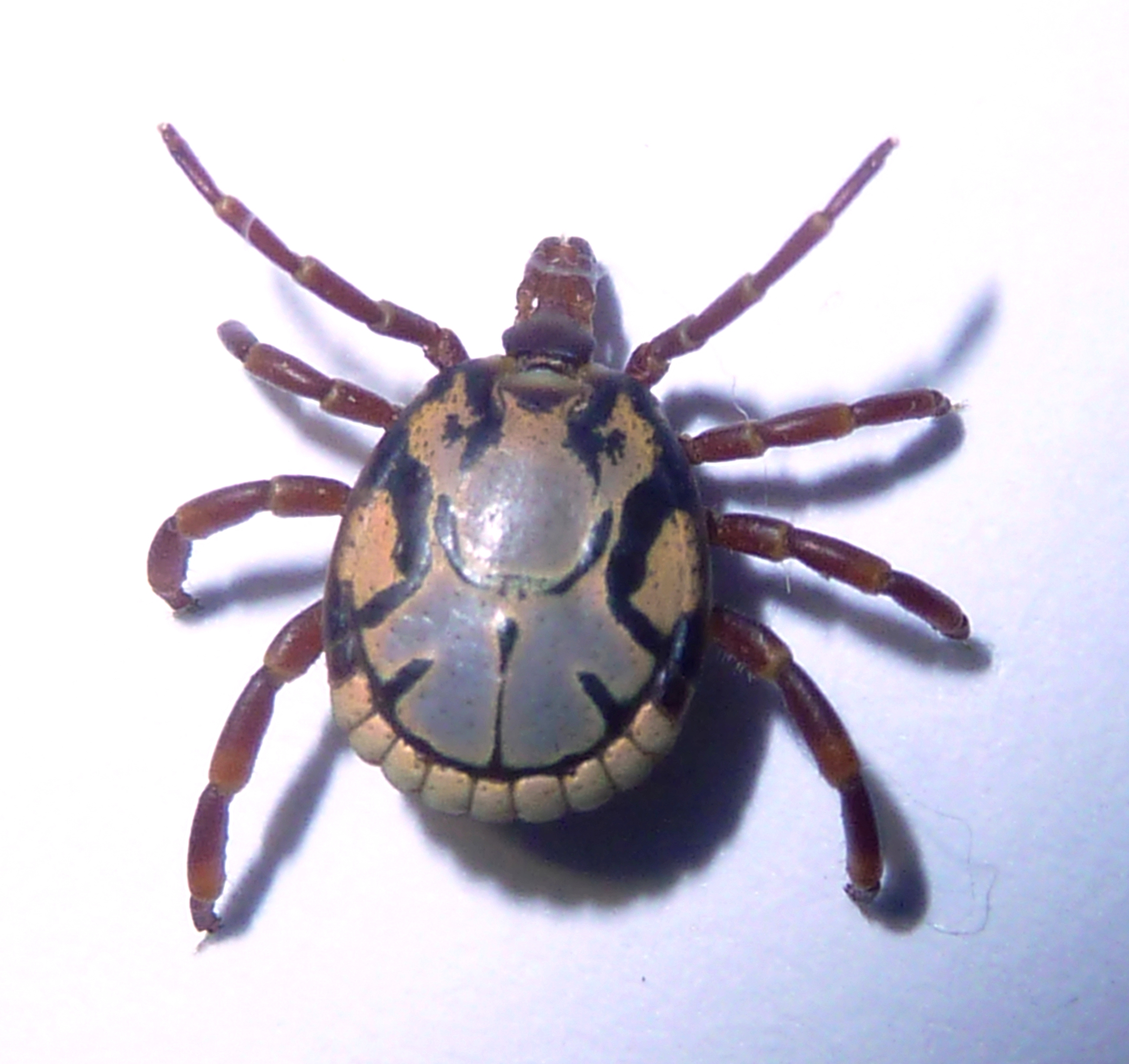
Amblyomma hebraeum, male

Two species of hard ticks, Amblyomma variegatum and Amblyomma hebraeum are the most common vectors of R. africae. Typically, A. hebraeum transmits the bacteria in South Africa while A. variegatum carries R. africae throughout West, Central and East Africa and through the French West Indies. Other species of Amblyomma in sub-Saharan Africa can also transmit R. africae and it may be that up to 100% of Amblyomma ticks in sub-Saharan Africa carry R. africae. Amblyomma ticks are most active from November to April. These tick species frequently feed on cattle and other livestock, but can also be found feeding on wild animals in areas where farm animals are not found. Unlike other hard tick species, which passively seek hosts by clinging to plants and waiting for a potential host to brush by in passing, the Amblyomma hard ticks actively seek out hosts.

Groups of tourists visiting Africa have returned to their own countries and were diagnosed there as having been infected.

Up until 1998, it was thought that only ticks in sub-Saharan Africa carried R. africae. However, a case of locally transmitted African tick bite fever in the French West Indies led to the discovery of R. africae carried by Amblyomma varigatum ticks introduced through cattle shipped from Senegal to Gaudeluope more than a century ago. R. africae has been isolated from ticks on several Caribbean islands, though the only cases in humans in the Caribbean have occurred in the French West Indies. R. africae has also been found in Amblyomma loculosum ticks in Oceania.

== Pathogenesis ==
After the rickettsia bacteria infects humans through a tick bite, it invades endothelial cells in the circulatory system (veins, arteries, capillaries). The body then releases chemicals that cause inflammation, resulting in the characteristic symptoms like headache and fever. The hallmark of all rickettsial diseases is a histology (cellular) finding called lymphohistiocytic vasculitis that involves immune cell deposition into the endothelial cells that make up vessels. This occurs secondary to the chemicals mentioned above, as well as damage from the infection, and involves signals to immune cells (T cells and macrophages) to come to the site of the infection.

Rickettsia bacteria species like R. africae replicate around the area of the initial tick bite, causing necrosis (cell death) and lymph node inflammation. This is the cause of the characteristic eschar.

== Diagnosis ==
Many patients with ATBF who live in areas with a high number of infections (Africa and the West Indies) do not visit a doctor, as most patients only have mild symptoms. This disease can, however, cause more serious symptoms in travelers who have never been exposed to the Rickettsia africae bacterium before and are not immune. Travelers who present to a doctor after a trip to affected areas can be hard to diagnose, as many tropical diseases cause a fever similar to that of ATBF. Other diseases that may look similar are malaria, dengue fever, tuberculosis, acute HIV and respiratory infections. In addition to questions about symptoms, doctors will ask patients for an accurate travel history and whether he/she was near animals or ticks. Microbiological tests are available for doctors, but are expensive and often must be done by special laboratories.

The antibiotic treatment available for rickettsiae infections has very few side effects, so if a doctor has a high suspicion of the disease, he or she may simply treat without doing more laboratory tests.

=== Blood tests ===
Diagnosis of ATBF is mostly based on symptoms, as many laboratory tests are not specific for ATBF. Common laboratory test signs of ATBF are a low white blood cell count (lymphopenia) and low platelet count (thrombocytopenia), a high C-reactive protein, and mildly high liver function tests.

=== Microbiological tests ===
Biopsies or cultures of a person's tick wound (eschar) are used to diagnose ATBF. However, this requires special culture media and can only be done by a laboratory with biohazard protection. There are more specialized laboratory tests available that use quantitative polymerase chain reactions (qPCR), but can only be done by laboratories with special equipment. Immunofluorescence assays can also be used, but are hard to interpret because of cross-reactions with other rickettsiae bacteria.

== Prevention ==
Prevention of ATBF centers around protecting oneself from tick bites by wearing long pants and shirt, and using insecticides like DEET on the skin. Travelers to rural areas in Africa and the West Indies should be aware that they may come in contact with ATBF tick vectors. Infection is more likely to occur in people who are traveling to rural areas or plan to spend time participating in outdoor activities. Extra caution should be taken in November–April, when Amblyomma ticks are more active. Inspection of the body, clothing, gear, and any pets after time outdoors can help to identify and remove ticks early.

== Treatment ==
African tick bite fever is usually mild, and most patients do not need more than at-home treatment with antibiotics for their illness. However, because so few patients with this infection visit a doctor, the best antibiotic choice, dose and length of treatment are not well known. Typically doctors treat this disease with antibiotics that have been used effectively for the treatment of other diseases caused by bacteria of similar species, such as Rocky Mountain Spotted Fever. For mild cases, people are usually treated with one of the following:

- doxycycline
- chloramphenicol
- ciprofloxacin

If a person has more severe symptoms, like a high fever or serious headache, the infection can be treated with doxycycline for a longer amount of time. Pregnant women should not use doxycycline or ciprofloxacin as both antibiotics can cause problems in fetuses. Josamycin has been used effectively for treatment of pregnant women with other rickettsial diseases, but it is unclear if it has a role in the treatment of ATBF.

== Epidemiology ==
Cases of African tick bite fever have been more frequently reported in the literature among international travelers. Data examining rates in local populations are limited. Among locals who live in endemic areas, exposure at a young age and mild symptoms or lack of symptoms, as well as decreased access to diagnostic tools, may lead to decreased diagnosis. In Zimbabwe, where R. africae is endemic, one study reported an estimated yearly incidence of 60–80 cases per 10,000 patients.

Looking at published data over the past 35 years, close to 200 confirmed cases of African tick bite fever in international travelers have been reported. The majority (~80%) of these cases occurred in travelers returning from South Africa.

== See also ==
- Boutonneuse fever
- Rocky Mountain spotted fever
- Flea-borne spotted fever
