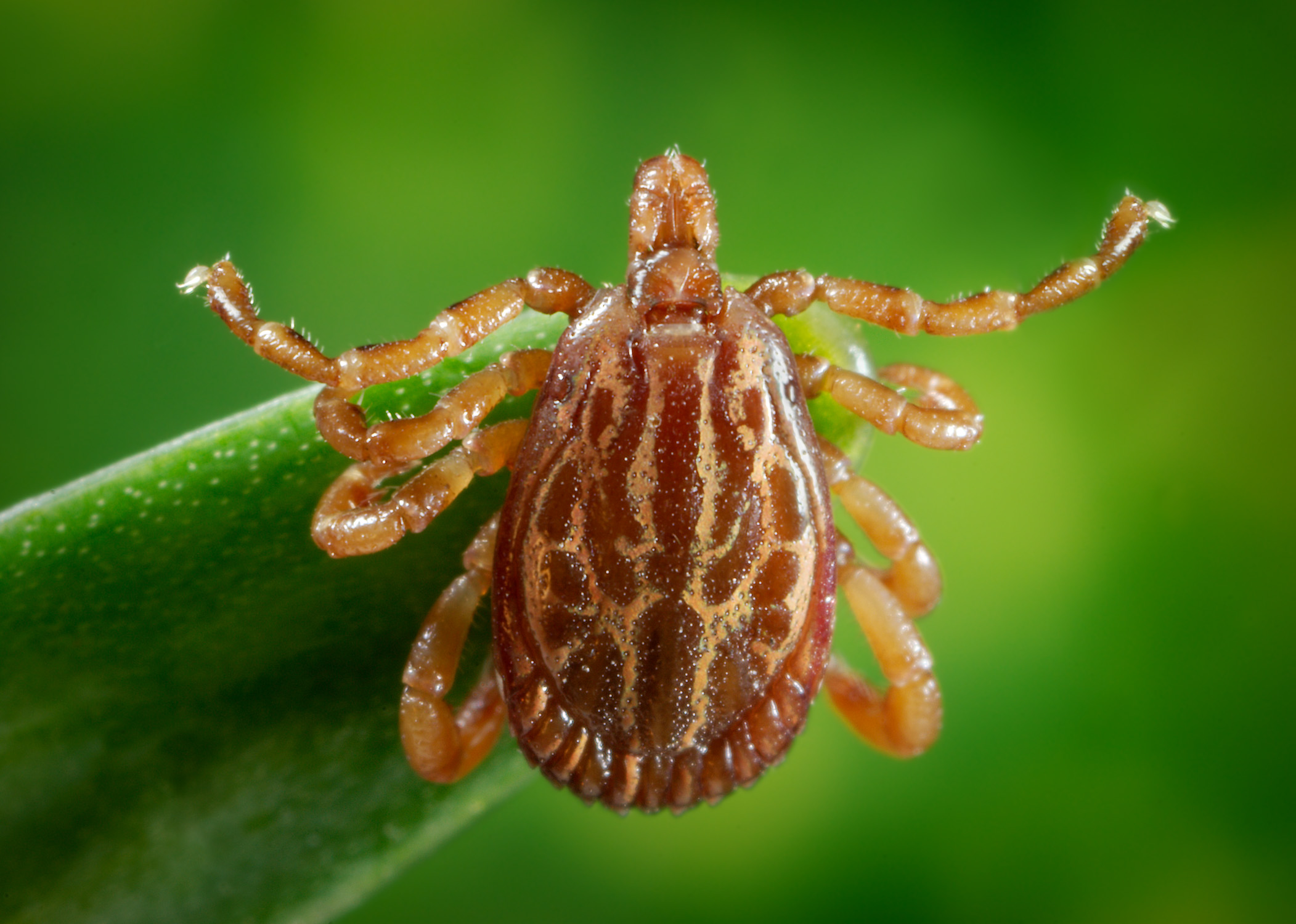

Scientific classification
- Kingdom: Animalia
- Phylum: Arthropoda
- Subphylum: Chelicerata
- Class: Arachnida
- Order: Ixodida
- Family: Ixodidae
- Genus: Amblyomma
- Species: A. triste

Binomial name
- Amblyomma triste Koch, 1844

= Amblyomma triste =

Species of tick

Amblyomma triste is a tick in the Amblyomma genus. The tick can be found in Venezuela, Argentina, Brasil, Colombia, Peru and Uruguay. Though not thought to be endemic to North America, a 2010 study found 27 specimens in 18 separate collections that had previously been misidentified in the United States.

The species has been found to carry the human-infectious Rickettsia parkeri which produces symptoms similar to Rocky Mountain spotted fever. The tick is the only tick responsible for tick-borne disease in humans in Uruguay, and has been identified as a significant vector of disease in Argentina and Brazil.

The tick was first described by Koch in 1844. The tick is morphologically similar to Amblyomma maculatum and Amblyomma tigrinum, both of which are also carriers of Rickettsia parkeri. Identification of the species in North America is often complicated due to the fact that they are cryptic species with those two species.
