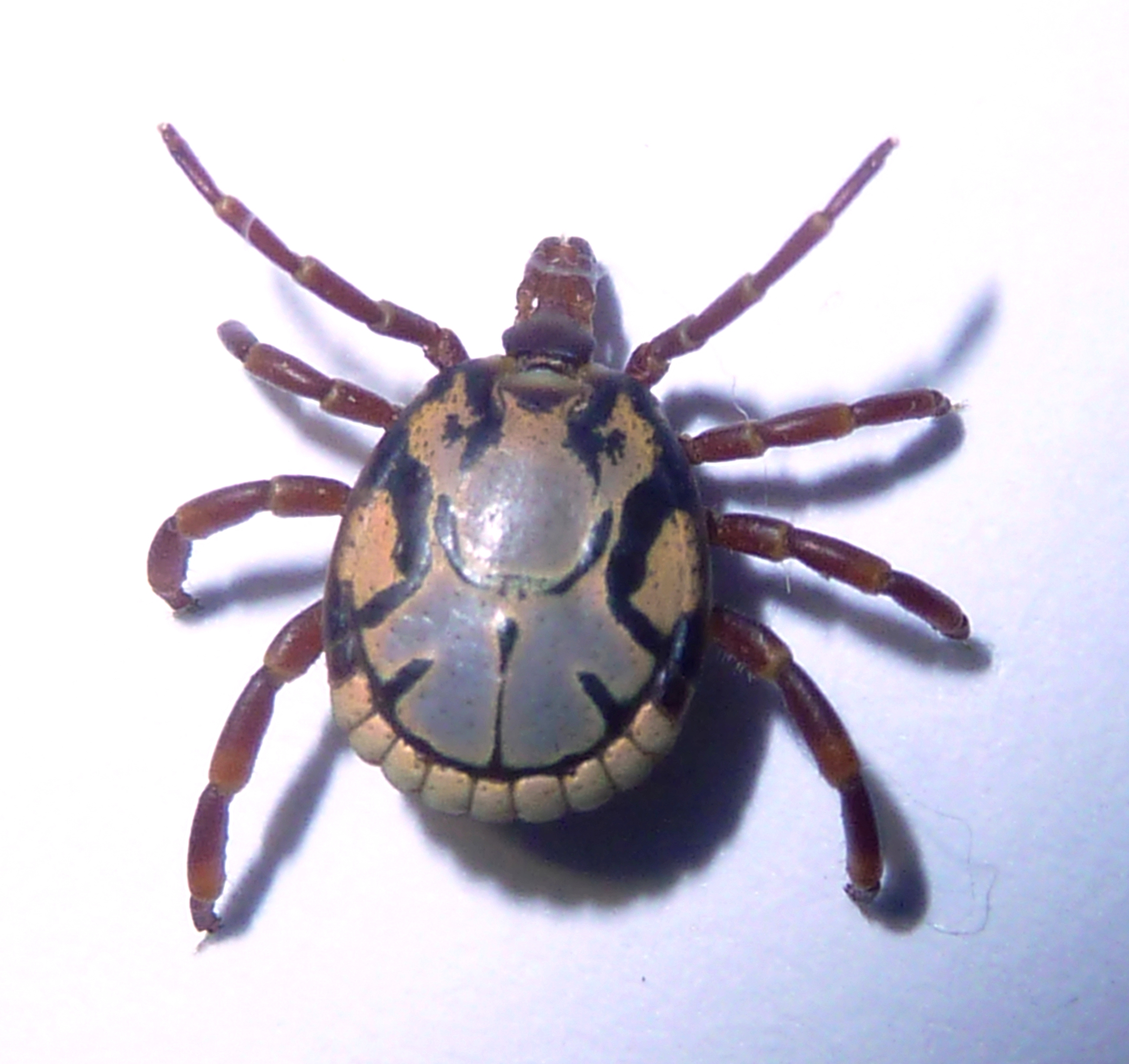

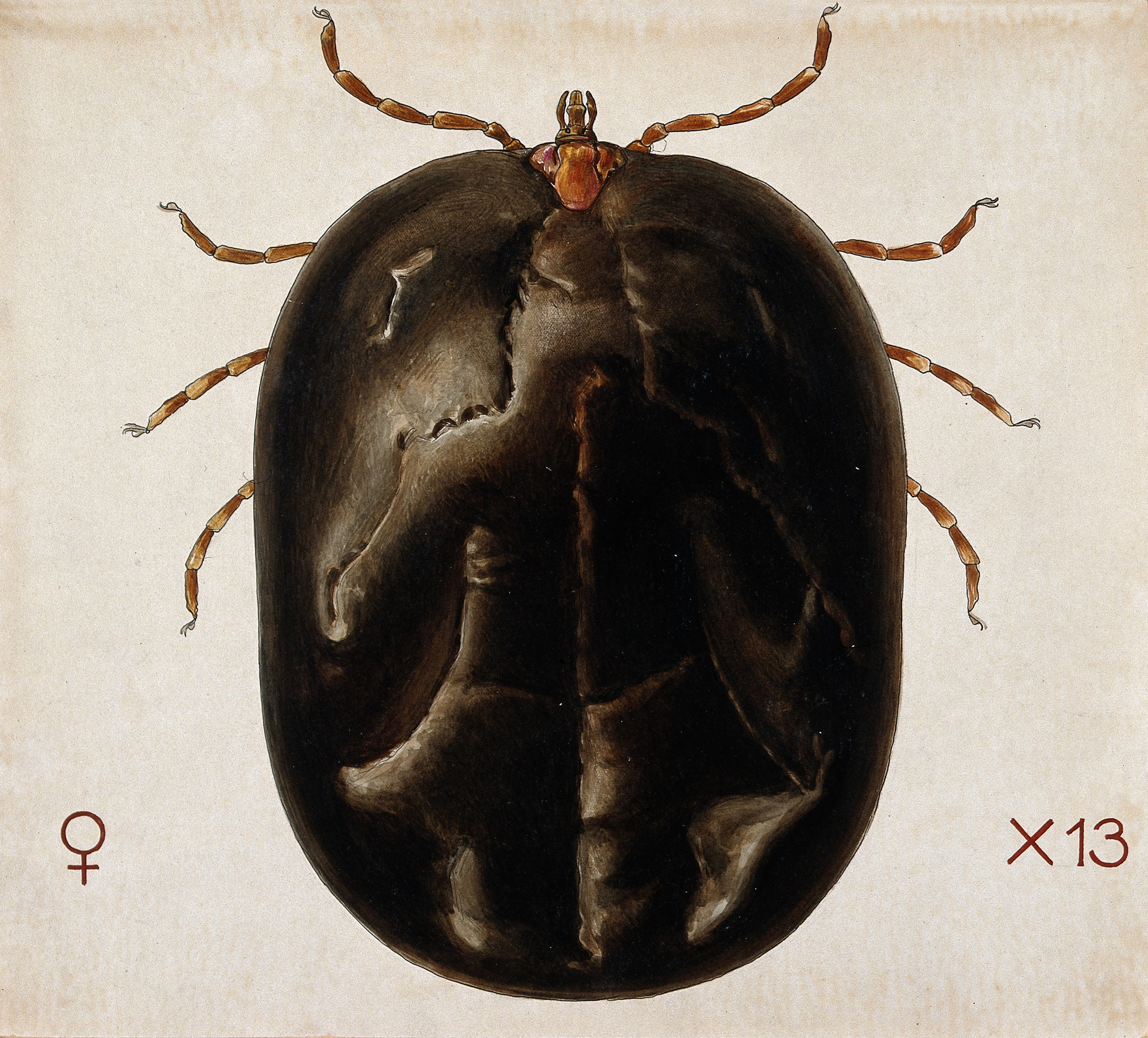
- Male and engorged female

Scientific classification
- Kingdom: Animalia
- Phylum: Arthropoda
- Subphylum: Chelicerata
- Class: Arachnida
- Order: Ixodida
- Family: Ixodidae
- Genus: Amblyomma
- Species: A. hebraeum

Binomial name
- Amblyomma hebraeum Koch, 1844

= Amblyomma hebraeum =

Species of tick

Amblyomma hebraeum, commonly known as the South African bont tick, is a species of hard tick that is native to southern Africa. They are sexually dimorphic.

== Description ==
The conscutum of the male is dappled in various shades and colours. The female's scutum is dappled but the alloscutum is solid black. The male conscutum and female alloscutum are fringed with prominent festoons. The legs are swarthy or reddish, and paler at the joints. Males measure 4-6mm in length; females may measure up to 20mm when fully engorged after feeding.

== Range ==
The species is native to eastern and northern South Africa, Eswatini, eastern Botswana, the greater part of Zimbabwe and southern Mozambique. To the north and in Madagascar, the species is replaced by the tropical bont tick, with which it locally overlaps.

== Disease vector ==
The nymph and adult stages are vectors for heartwater disease, which affects various species of domesticated ruminants. Some wild ruminants are susceptible to the disease and suffer from clinical heartwater, but others are highly resistant. The ticks remain infective for life, but their infection rates vary according to the season and region where they occur. In South Africa, 1 to 7% of ticks are infected at any one time.
