= Amblyomma varanense =

Scientific classification
- Kingdom: Animalia
- Phylum: Arthropoda
- Subphylum: Chelicerata
- Class: Arachnida
- Order: Ixodida
- Family: Ixodidae
- Genus: Amblyomma
- Species: A. varanense

Binomial name
- Amblyomma varanense Supino, 1897

Synonyms
- Aponomma barbouri Anastos, 1950; Aponomma gervaisi lucasi Warburton, 1910; Aponomma lucasi Schulze, 1933; Aponomma quadratum Cooper & Robinson, 1908; Aponomma varanense Santos Dias, 1958; Aponomma varanensis Santos Dias, 1958; Aponomma (Aponomma) varanense Keirans, King & Sharrad, 1994; Ixodes varanensis Supino, 1897

Species of tick

The Asian monitor lizard tick, (Amblyomma varanense) is a hard-bodied tick of the genus Amblyomma. It is found in India, Thailand, Taiwan and Sri Lanka. Adults parasitize various reptiles such as varanids and snakes. These ticks are potential vectors of spotted fever group (SFG) rickettsiae.
