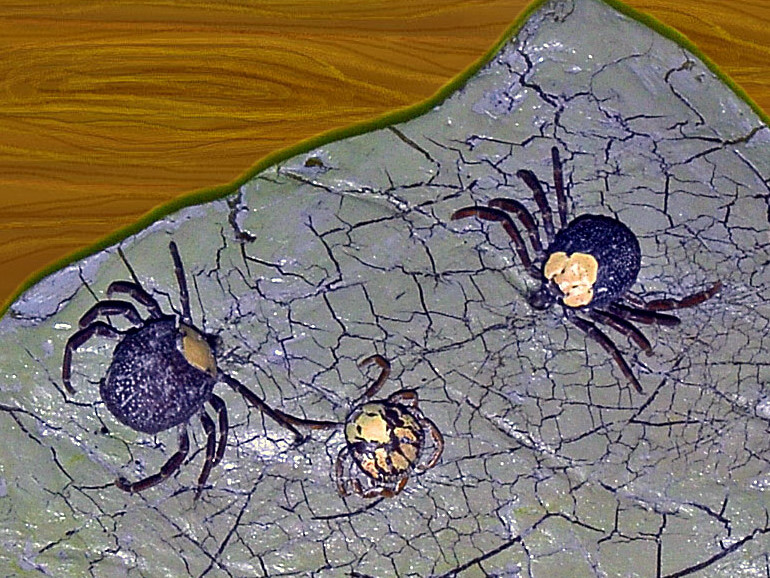
- Amblyomma rhinocerotis. Museum specimen

Scientific classification
- Domain: Eukaryota
- Kingdom: Animalia
- Phylum: Arthropoda
- Subphylum: Chelicerata
- Class: Arachnida
- Order: Ixodida
- Family: Ixodidae
- Genus: Amblyomma
- Species: A. rhinocerotis

Binomial name
- Amblyomma rhinocerotis De Geer, 1778

Synonyms
- List: Amblyomma (xiphiastor) rhinocerotis Camicas et al., 1998; Amblyomma (anastosiella) rhinocerotis Santos Dias, 1993; Rhipicephalus walckenaeri Kratz, 1940; Hyalomma walckenaeri Bequaert, 1933; Dermacentor rhinocerotis Neumann, 1911; Amblyomma aureum Neumann, 1899; Amblyomma foai Neumann, 1899; Amblyomma walckenaeri Neumann, 1899; Dermacentor rhinocerotis Neumann, 1897; Dermacentor rhinozerotis Karsch, 1878; Amblyomma petersi Karsch, 1878; Ixodes walckenaeri Paul Gervais, 1844; Ixodes walckenaeri Paul Gervais, 1842; Ixodes rhinocerotis Fabricius, 1805; Cynorhaestes rhinocerotis Hermann, 1804; Acarus rhinocerotis De Geer, 1778

= Amblyomma rhinocerotis =

Species of tick

Amblyomma rhinocerotis is a species of tick belonging to the family Ixodidae. [2][3][4] The species was first discovered in 1778 in the southern parts of Africa; however it disappeared in the 1970s before reappearing again in 2017 in the northern parts of Africa. It is primarily a rhino parasite. [5]

== Bibliography ==
- George Henry Falkiner Nuttall, William Francis Cooper, Cecil Warburton, Louis Edward Robinson - Ticks, a Monograph of the Ixodoidea,: Bibliography of the ixodoidea, Vol. 1-2
- Omobolanle Kushimo The Tick Genus Amblyomma in Africa: Phylogenyand Mutilocus DNA Barcoding

Horak, I. G., Boshoff, C. R., Cooper, D. V., Foggin, C. M., Govender, D., Harrison, A., Hausler, G., Hofmeyr, M., Kilian, J. W., MacFadyen, D. N., Nel, P. J., Peinke, D., Squarre, D., & Zimmermann, D. (2017). Parasites of domestic and wild animals in South Africa. XLIX. Ticks (Acari: Ixodidae) infesting white and black rhinoceroses in southern Africa. The Onderstepoort journal of veterinary research, 84(1), e1–e11. Horak, I. G., Heyne, H., Williams, R., Gallivan, G. J., Spickett, A. M., Bezuidenhout, J. D., & Estrada-Peña, A. (2018). The ixodid ticks (Acari: Ixodidae) of southern Africa. Springer.
