= Amblyomma clypeolatum =

Scientific classification
- Domain: Eukaryota
- Kingdom: Animalia
- Phylum: Arthropoda
- Subphylum: Chelicerata
- Class: Arachnida
- Order: Ixodida
- Family: Ixodidae
- Genus: Amblyomma
- Species: A. clypeolatum

Binomial name
- Amblyomma clypeolatum Neumann, 1899

Synonyms
- Amblyomma atrogenatum Nuttall & Warburton, 1908; Amblyomma zeylanicum Neumann, 1908; Amblyomma (Adenopleura) clypeolatum Santos Dias, 1993; Amblyomma (Xiphiastor) clypeolatum Camicas et al., 1998

Species of tick

The Asian tortoise tick, (Amblyomma clypeolatum) is a hard-bodied tick of the genus Amblyomma. The tick is a parasite of tortoises, such as Geochelone elegans, domestic dogs, buffaloes. It is found in India, Sri Lanka and Myanmar. Adult tick is about 3 cm in length.
