= Amblyomma integrum =

Scientific classification
- Domain: Eukaryota
- Kingdom: Animalia
- Phylum: Arthropoda
- Subphylum: Chelicerata
- Class: Arachnida
- Order: Ixodida
- Family: Ixodidae
- Genus: Amblyomma
- Species: A. integrum

Binomial name
- Amblyomma integrum Karsch, 1879

Synonyms
- Amblyomma distinctum Karsch, 1879; Amblyomma prolongatum Neumann, 1906; Amblyomma (Theileriella) integrum Santos Dias, 1993; Amblyomma (Xiphiastor) integrum Camicas et al., 1998

Species of tick

Amblyomma integrum is a hard-bodied tick of the genus Amblyomma. It is found in India and Sri Lanka. Adults parasitize various larger mammals such as buffalo and cattle, whereas nymphs and larvae use mostly larger and medium mammals. In Sri Lanka, tick was identified as an agent of human otoacariasis.
