= Amblyomma javanense =

Scientific classification
- Domain: Eukaryota
- Kingdom: Animalia
- Phylum: Arthropoda
- Subphylum: Chelicerata
- Class: Arachnida
- Order: Ixodida
- Family: Ixodidae
- Genus: Amblyomma
- Species: A. javanense

Binomial name
- Amblyomma javanense Supino, 1897

Synonyms
- Amblyomma badium (Neumann, 1901); Amblyomma capponii (Toumanoff & Maillard, 1957); Amblyomma compressum javanense (Schulze, 1941); Amblyomma indicum (Arthur, 1960); Amblyomma javanense javanense (Schulze, 1937); Amblyomma sublaeve (Neumann, 1899); Amblyomma (Adenopleura) javanense (Camicas et al., 1998); Aponomma javanense (Cooper & Robinson, 1908); Aponomma politum (Neumann, 1899); Dermacentor indicus (Supino, 1897); Haemalastor javanensis (Oudemans, 1939); Rhipicephalus javanensis (Supino, 1897)

Species of hard-bodied tick

Amblyomma javanense is a hard-bodied tick of the genus Amblyomma. It is found in Vietnam, Indonesia, Malaysia, India, Sri Lanka, Philippines and Thailand. It is the only ectoparasite found on the Manis javanica, Manis crassicaudata and also from Sus scrofa.
