= Amblyomma albopictum =

Scientific classification
- Kingdom: Animalia
- Phylum: Arthropoda
- Subphylum: Chelicerata
- Class: Arachnida
- Order: Ixodida
- Family: Ixodidae
- Genus: Amblyomma
- Species: A. albopictum

Binomial name
- Amblyomma albopictum Neumann, 1899

Species of tick

Amblyomma albopictum is a species of tropical hard ticks. It is typically found parasitizing Cyclura nubila, Chilabothrus angulifer, Cubophis cantherigerus, Leiocephalus carinatus, and less commonly the Paraguaian hairy dwarf porcupine. The species has been found in Costa Rica, Cuba, Haiti, Honduras and the Dominican Republic, and has also been reported but not confirmed in Brazil. The tick was described by Louis Georges Neumann in 1899.
