= Ixodes trianguliceps =

Scientific classification
- Domain: Eukaryota
- Kingdom: Animalia
- Phylum: Arthropoda
- Subphylum: Chelicerata
- Class: Arachnida
- Order: Ixodida
- Family: Ixodidae
- Genus: Ixodes
- Species: I. trianguliceps

Binomial name
- Ixodes trianguliceps Birula, 1895

Synonyms
- Ixodes nivalis Rondelli, 1928; Ixodes tenuirostris Neumann, 1901; Ixodes heroldi Schulze, 1939; Ixodes suecicus Schulze, 1930

Species of tick

Ixodes trianguliceps is a species of ticks from the family Ixodidae that feeds on such mammals as shrew, rats, mice, hedgehogs, foxes, squirrels, moles, rabbits and hares. It also frequently feeds on horses and humans. It is mostly found in European countries such as Belgium, Denmark, France, Germany, the Netherlands, Ireland, Poland, Norway, Sweden, Switzerland, the United Kingdom and northern parts of Spain, at elevations of up to 2,400 metres (7,900 ft). It is also found in Belarus, Bulgaria, the Czech Republic, the Netherlands, Slovenia, Moldova, Ukraine and Russia.
