= Amblyomma tuberculatum =

Scientific classification
- Domain: Eukaryota
- Kingdom: Animalia
- Phylum: Arthropoda
- Subphylum: Chelicerata
- Class: Arachnida
- Order: Ixodida
- Family: Ixodidae
- Genus: Amblyomma
- Species: A. tuberculatum

Binomial name
- Amblyomma tuberculatum Marx, 1894

Species of tick

Amblyomma tuberculatum, commonly known as the gopher tortoise tick, is a species of hard tick native to the United States whose adult and nymphal stages are commonly collected from the gopher tortoise, Gopherus polyphemus, with as many as 19 individual ticks taken from a single tortoise.

== Life cycle ==
Adult female specimens of A. tuberculatum collected in Alabama and Georgia and maintained in the laboratory engorged on tortoises and ingested at least 2,160 mg of blood and produced up to 9,353 eggs each. Eggs incubated at constant temperatures hatched at 21.1 - 32.2 °C. Larvae engorged in 9–13 days on rabbits and molted to the nymph in a minimum of 20 days. Larvae exposed to subfreezing temperatures of −1 °C survived 46 days. Nymphs engorged in 10–37 days on rabbits, and molted to adults in a minimum of 19 days. The life cycle required a minimum of 207 days.

== Distribution ==
The distribution of Amblyomma tuberculatum has been thought to be intrinsically linked to the distribution of its primary host, the gopher tortoise, but the presence of gopher tortoises does not always equate to the presence of A. tuberculatum, with only 23% of gopher tortoise populations infested with A. tuberculatum in one study, suggesting a more restricted distribution for the tick than that of its host. In a 2011 study, A. tuberculatum was found only at sites with a mean sand depth of >100 cm and a mean percentage of topsoil and burrow apron sand composition >94.0% and >92.4%, respectively, indicating that environmental factors, not just host range, influence the distribution of A. tuberculatum.
