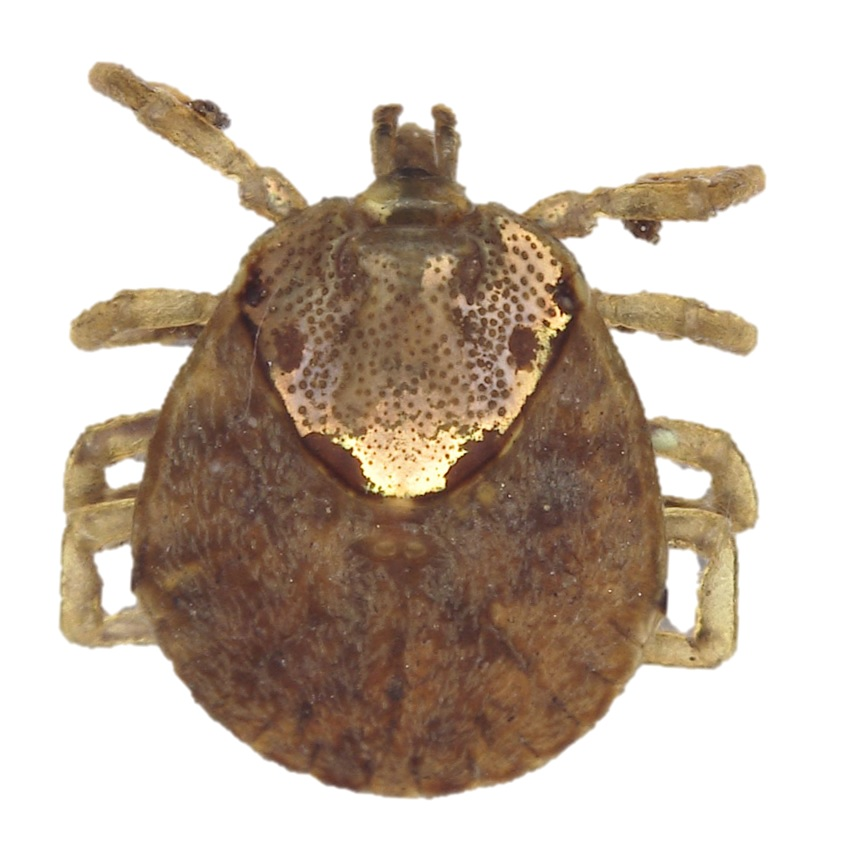
- Amblyomma kappa (adult female)

Scientific classification
- Kingdom: Animalia
- Phylum: Arthropoda
- Subphylum: Chelicerata
- Class: Arachnida
- Order: Ixodida
- Family: Ixodidae
- Genus: Amblyomma
- Species: A. kappa

Binomial name
- Amblyomma kappa Kwak, 2024

= Kappa tick =

Species of tick

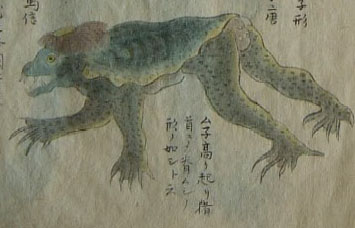
Kappa: a reptilian monster (yokai) from Japanese folklore

The kappa tick (Amblyomma kappa) is a reptile tick native to parts of subtropical East Asia. It occurs in the Ryukyu Islands of Japan, Taiwan (ROC), and parts of southern China (PRC). Turtles serve as the primary hosts for this species, though it has also occasionally been collected on snakes. Humans are occasionally infested by this species, but these interactions are uncommon and humans are accidental hosts for kappa ticks.

This species was named for the Japanese yokai of the same name (kappa) which is a reptilian monster associated with water often depicted as having a turtle-like shell. The name was chosen due to the preference of the kappa tick for reptiles, especially turtles.
