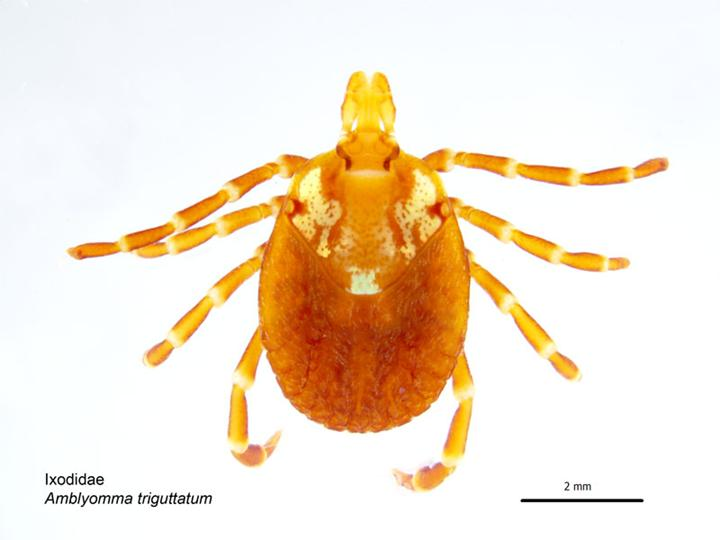
- Amblyomma triguttatum female

Scientific classification
- Kingdom: Animalia
- Phylum: Arthropoda
- Subphylum: Chelicerata
- Class: Arachnida
- Order: Ixodida
- Family: Ixodidae
- Genus: Amblyomma
- Species: A. triguttatum

Binomial name
- Amblyomma triguttatum Koch, 1844

= Amblyomma triguttatum =

Species of tick

Amblyomma triguttatum, commonly known as the ornate kangaroo tick, is a species of tick in the genus Amblyomma native to Australia, in Western Australia, parts of Queensland, and in New South Wales.

== Subspecies ==
There are four subspecies, one or more of which might be separate species. The subspecies include Am. t. ornatissimum, Am. t. queenslandensis, Am. t. rosei, and Am. t. triguttatum.

The nominate subspecies is a vector for Rickettsia.

== Ecology ==
Like all species in its family, Ixodidae (known as hard ticks), the kangaroo tick is a parasitic arachnid and is an obligate hematophage, solely consuming blood for its nutritional needs.

=== Life-cycle ===
The life cycle of Amblyomma triguttatum is characterised by a three-host pattern, with each developmental stage necessitating a host for a blood meal. This obligate haematophagy is crucial for the tick's progression through its larval, nymphal, and adult stages. The process involves a recurring sequence of feeding, detachment, and moulting. Notably, adult male ticks deviate from this pattern, generally forgoing blood meals in favour of seeking reproductive opportunities with adult females. Conversely, female ticks typically engage in all three blood-feeding stages throughout their development.

=== Hosts ===
Thought to be a carrier of Q fever, in addition to parasitising macropods such as western grey kangaroos and tammar wallabies, it has been found on a variety of other mammalian hosts, including black rats, European rabbits, domesticated dogs and cats, and humans.
