= Amblyomma tonelliae =

Scientific classification
- Domain: Eukaryota
- Kingdom: Animalia
- Phylum: Arthropoda
- Subphylum: Chelicerata
- Class: Arachnida
- Order: Ixodida
- Family: Ixodidae
- Genus: Amblyomma
- Species: A. tonelliae

Binomial name
- Amblyomma tonelliae Nava et al., 2014

Species of tick

Amblyomma tonelliae is a species of tick of the genus Amblyomma. The species is associated with dry areas of the Chaco region, spanning central-northern Argentina to Bolivia and Paraguay. Rickettsia species can habitate A. tonelliae endosymbiotically.

It is named after Maria Tonelli-Rondelli.
