= Amblyomma gervaisi =

Scientific classification
- Kingdom: Animalia
- Phylum: Arthropoda
- Subphylum: Chelicerata
- Class: Arachnida
- Order: Ixodida
- Family: Ixodidae
- Genus: Amblyomma
- Species: A. gervaisi

Binomial name
- Amblyomma gervaisi (Lucas, 1847)

Synonyms
- Aponomma (Aponomma) gervaisi Keirans, King & Sharrad, 1994; Aponomma (Aponomma) pulchrum Santos Dias, 1993; Aponomma gervaisi f. typica Sharif, 1928; Aponomma gervaisi Neumann, 1899; Aponomma gervaisi toreuma Schulze, 1941; Aponomma pulchrum Roberts, 1953; Haemaphysalis sindensis Bilques & Masood, 1990; Aponomma patagonicum Schulze, 1936; Ixodes gervaisii Lucas, 1847; Ophiodes gervaisii Murray, 1877; Ophiodes ophiophilus Murray, 1877

Species of tick

Amblyomma gervaisi is a hard-bodied tick of the genus Amblyomma. The tick is a parasite of snakes, such as Naja naja, Python molurus species and monitor species such as Varanus ocellatus, Varanus yemenensis, Varanus benghalensis, Varanus griseus and many other Varanus species in southeastern Asia and Asia-minor. They exhibit sexual dimorphism. They can be found in Sri Lanka, India, Yemen, Saudi Arabia. It is a potential vector for Coxiella burnetii.
