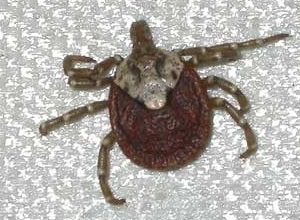

Scientific classification
- Domain: Eukaryota
- Kingdom: Animalia
- Phylum: Arthropoda
- Subphylum: Chelicerata
- Class: Arachnida
- Order: Ixodida
- Family: Ixodidae
- Genus: Amblyomma
- Species: A. testudinarium

Binomial name
- Amblyomma testudinarium Koch, 1844

Synonyms
- Amblyomma compactum Neumann, 1901; Amblyomma cyprium cyprium Chang, 1958 (misapplied name); Amblyomma fallax Schulze, 1932; Amblyomma infestum Koch, 1844; Amblyomma infestum borneense Schulze, 1936; Amblyomma infestum taivanicum Schulze, 1935; Amblyomma infestum testudinarium Schulze, 1932; Amblyomma testudinarium taivanicum Luh & Wao, 1950; Amblyomma yajimai Kishida, 1935; Amblyomma (Anastosiella) infestum Santos Dias, 1993; Amblyomma (Xiphiastor) testudinarium Camicas et al., 1998; Ixodes auriscutellatus Koningsberger, 1901

= Amblyomma testudinarium =

Species of tick

Amblyomma testudinarium is a hard-bodied tick of the genus Amblyomma. It is found in Indonesia, India, Japan, Thailand, Sri Lanka and Vietnam. Adults parasitize various larger mammals such as buffalo and cattle, whereas nymphs and larvae use mostly larger and medium mammals.

== Records ==
In 2010, a 74-year-old Korean woman was bitten by the tick, which is the first human case of Amblyomma bite from Korea. More human bites were recorded from Japan as well. Apart from humans, it is a common ectoparasite of medium to large-sized mammals. SFTS virus was detected from the tick larva. In 1993, Rickettsia sp. strain AT-1T was isolated from the ticks from Japan.
