= Amblyomma patinoi =

Scientific classification
- Domain: Eukaryota
- Kingdom: Animalia
- Phylum: Arthropoda
- Subphylum: Chelicerata
- Class: Arachnida
- Order: Ixodida
- Family: Ixodidae
- Genus: Amblyomma
- Species: A. patinoi

Binomial name
- Amblyomma patinoi Nava et al., 2014

Species of tick

Amblyomma patinoi is a species of tick of the genus Amblyomma. The species is associated with the Eastern Cordillera of Colombia. Rickettsia species can habitate A. patinoi endosymbiotically.
