= Rickettsia africae =

Scientific classification
- Domain: Bacteria
- Kingdom: Pseudomonadati
- Phylum: Pseudomonadota
- Class: Alphaproteobacteria
- Order: Rickettsiales
- Family: Rickettsiaceae
- Genus: Rickettsia
- Species group: Spotted fever group
- Species: R. africae

Binomial name
- Rickettsia africae Kelly et al. 1996

Species of bacterium

Rickettsia africae is a species of Rickettsia.

It can cause African tick-bite fever.
