= Amblyomma nodosum =

Scientific classification
- Domain: Eukaryota
- Kingdom: Animalia
- Phylum: Arthropoda
- Subphylum: Chelicerata
- Class: Arachnida
- Order: Ixodida
- Family: Ixodidae
- Genus: Amblyomma
- Species: A. nodosum

Binomial name
- Amblyomma nodosum Neumann, 1899

Species of tick

Amblyomma nodosum is a species of specialized tick, found in three roadkilled giant anteaters from Minas Gerais, Brazil. There are 100 species of Amblyomma worldwide, 33 of which are from Brazil. A. nodosum is a specialist that lives exclusively on the giant anteater (Myrmecophaga tridactyla) and the Southern tamandua (Tamandua tetradactyla).
