= Amblyomma interandinum =

Scientific classification
- Domain: Eukaryota
- Kingdom: Animalia
- Phylum: Arthropoda
- Subphylum: Chelicerata
- Class: Arachnida
- Order: Ixodida
- Family: Ixodidae
- Genus: Amblyomma
- Species: A. interandinum

Binomial name
- Amblyomma interandinum Nava et al., 2014

Species of tick

Amblyomma interandinum is a species of tick of the genus Amblyomma. The species is associated with the northern part of the Inter-Andean valley of Peru. Rickettsia species can habitate A. interandinum endosymbiotically.
