= Maria Tonelli-Rondelli =

Italian biologist

- Born: Maria Rondelli; 1899; Turin, Italy
- Died: 1970 (aged 70–71)
- Education: University of Turin
- Known for: ticks (Ixodidae)
- Spouse: Leonida Tonelli
- Scientific career
- Author abbrev. (zoology): Tonelli-Rondelli

Maria Tonelli-Rondelli (1899 – 1970) was an Italian entomologist who studied the taxonomy and identification of ticks (Ixodidae), with a particular focus on South American species.

== Early life and education ==
She was born in Turin in 1899, the daughter of Alipio Rondelli and Maria Pia (Marina) Zanetti. She studied at the University of Turin, earning a degree in natural sciences in 1921 and another in geography in 1923. After graduating, she worked at the university. She married the mathematician Leonida Tonelli in 1927, who died in 1946.

== Career ==
She began her career by translating into Italian volumes of Zoology by Rémy Perrier. This was published with a preface by the Italian zoologist Umberto Pierantoni. However the focus of her career was on ticks. She examined specimens in the collections at Milan and Turin museums and specimens from scientific expeditions. In 1928 she described a new species, Ixodes nivalis from specimens obtained in the Gran Paradiso National Park in Italy. She worked especially on ticks found in South America. These included Amblyomma, a genus of hard ticks which are particularly diverse in the Americas. Some species are vectors of disease. She was able to re-examine specimens described by Carl Ludwig Koch in 1844 and provide improved illustrations and descriptions. She also proposed that, because of differences in the morphology among specimens of the species Amblyomma cajennense, it should be divided into several different species. A. cajennense can transmit Rocky Mountain spotted fever so its unambiguous identification was important. Later workers considered that these differences were inherent variation between individuals of only one species and not sufficient to define new species. The application of molecular taxonomic methods in the twenty-first century has, however, demonstrated that some of these morphological distinctions indeed mark distinct species.

== Legacy ==
In 2014 the new species Amblyomma tonelliae was named after her.

== Publications ==
- Translation into Italian of Zoology by Rémy Perrier
- Tonelli-Rondelli M. Ixodoidea del museo di Torino. Boll Mus Zool Anatom Comp. 1931;41:1–19.
- Tonelli-Rondelli M. Ixodoidea. Parte I.-Amblyomma ovale Koch, Amblyomma cajennense Fabricius e le specie a loro affini nuove o poco note. Riv Parassitol. 1937;1:237–99.
- Tonelli-Rondelli M. A contribution to the knowledge of the South American fauna of Ixodoidea. Riv Parassitol. 1939;3:273–300.
- Tonelli-Rondelli M. Ixodoidea Parte II—contributo alla conoscenza della fauna ixodologica Sud-Americiana. Riv Parassitol. 1939;3:39–55.
