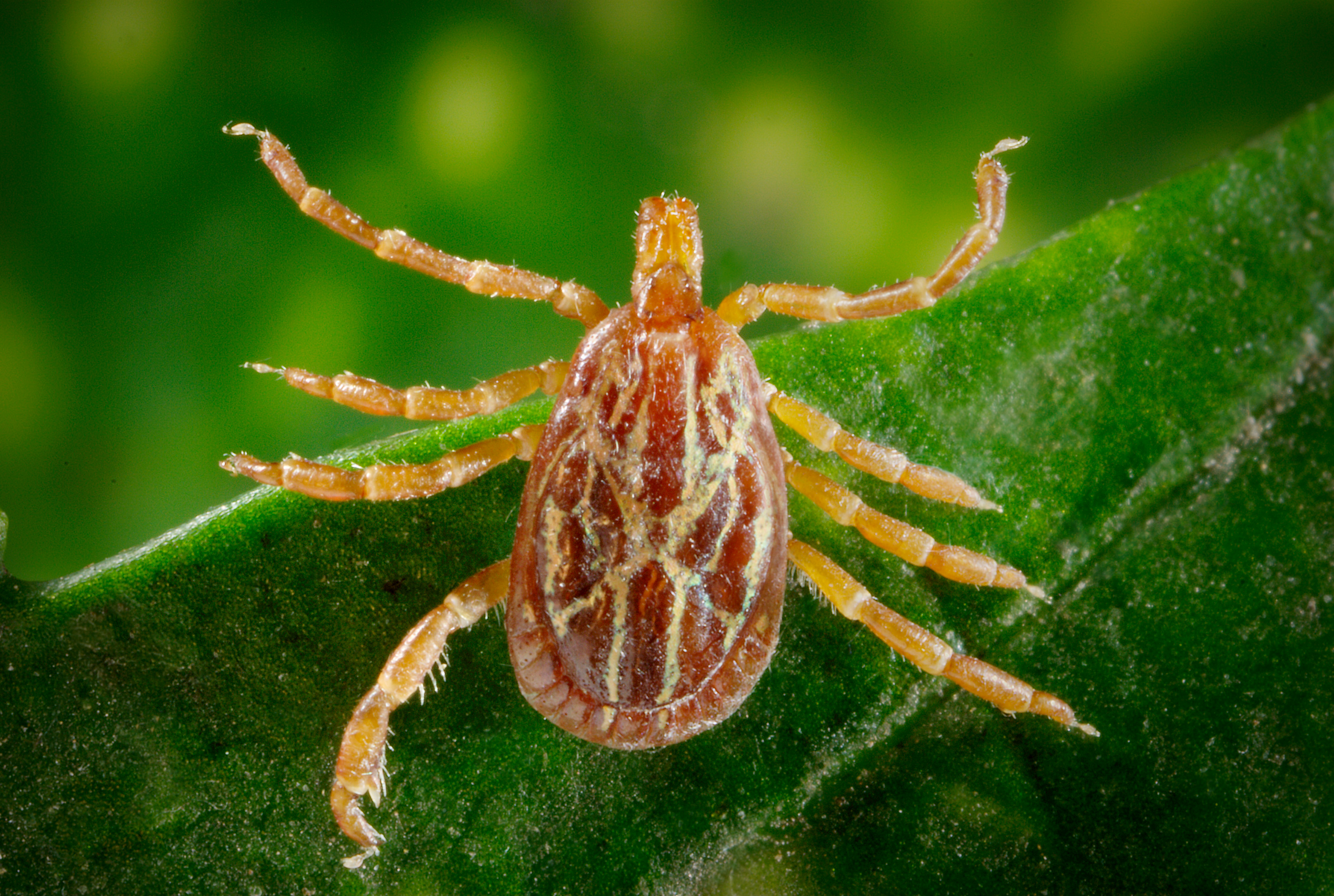

Scientific classification
- Domain: Eukaryota
- Kingdom: Animalia
- Phylum: Arthropoda
- Subphylum: Chelicerata
- Class: Arachnida
- Order: Ixodida
- Family: Ixodidae
- Genus: Amblyomma
- Species: A. maculatum

Binomial name
- Amblyomma maculatum Koch, 1844

= Amblyomma maculatum =

Species of tick

Amblyomma maculatum (Gulf Coast tick) is a species of tick in the genus Amblyomma. Immatures usually infest small mammals and birds that dwell on the ground; cotton rats may be particularly favored hosts. Some recorded hosts include:

- Geothlypis trichas
- Cardinalis cardinalis
- Passerina ciris
- Sialia sialis
- Thryothorus ludovicianus
- Troglodytes aedon
- Zonotrichia albicollis
- Dog (Canis lupus familiaris)
- Dama dama
- Human (Homo sapiens)
- Eastern woodrat (Neotoma floridana)
- Odocoileus virginianus
- Marsh rice rat (Oryzomys palustris)
- Cotton mouse (Peromyscus gossypinus)
- Hispid cotton rat (Sigmodon hispidus)
- Pig (Sus scrofa)
- Sylvilagus palustris

In 2013, the infectious agent of American tick bite fever, Rickettsia parkeri was detected in a female A. maculatum collected at Bombay Hook National Wildlife Refuge, near Smyrna, Delaware, providing the first evidence of association of this pathogen of humans with this species of tick in the state.

== See also ==
- List of parasites of the marsh rice rat
- List of parasites of humans

== Literature cited ==
- Clark, K.L., Oliver, J.H., Jr., Grego, J.M., James, A.M., Durden, L.A. and Banks, C.W. 2001. Host associations of ticks parasitizing rodents at Borrelia burgdorferi enzootic sites in South Carolina. Journal of Parasitology 87(6):1379–1386.
- Wilson, N. and Durden, L.A. 2003. Ectoparasites of terrestrial vertebrates inhabiting the Georgia Barrier Islands, USA: an inventory and preliminary biogeographical analysis (subscription required). Journal of Biogeography 30(8):1207–1220.
