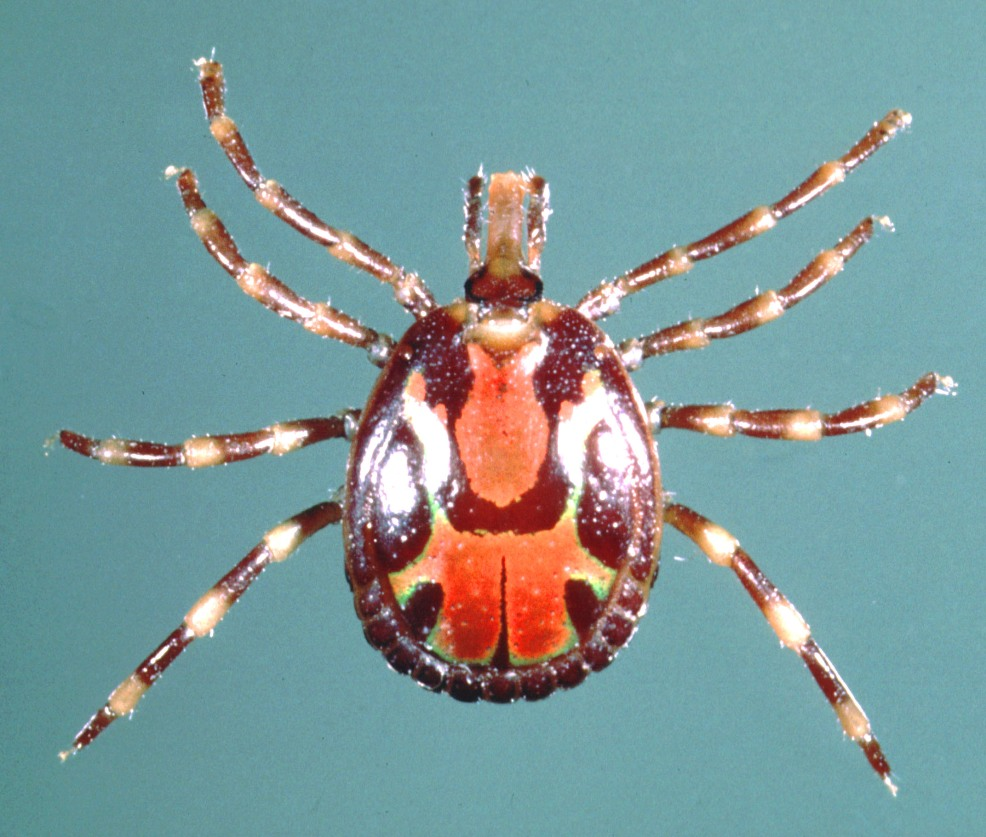
- A male of Amblyomma variegatum

Scientific classification
- Kingdom: Animalia
- Phylum: Arthropoda
- Subphylum: Chelicerata
- Class: Arachnida
- Order: Ixodida
- Family: Ixodidae
- Genus: Amblyomma
- Species: A. variegatum

Binomial name
- Amblyomma variegatum (Fabricius, 1794)

= Amblyomma variegatum =

Species of tick

Amblyomma variegatum, commonly known as the tropical bont tick, is a species of tick of the genus Amblyomma endemic to Africa. It has spread from its centre of origin to several countries, including the Caribbean islands, where it is known as the Senegalese tick (due to the suspected introduction of the tick from cattle imports from that country) and the Antigua gold tick. They are vividly coloured (especially the males) and have a substantial impact on livestock, primarily through their transmission of diseases. They are three-host hard ticks (where each life stage completes a blood meal on a particular host before dropping off and ecdysis) that have been found on a variety of domesticated species such as camels, cattle, goats, sheep, dogs, and various species of wildlife.

The internal anatomy of Amblyomma variegatum has been described in detail in 2025.

== Control ==
Control programmes have not fared as well as for Rhipicephalus (Boophilus) spp. due to the wider host range. Kelly et al. 2014 obtained good results using livestock tags impregnated with an attraction-aggregation-attachment pheromone and acaricide. Their method shows promise for use elsewhere, if the problem of thick vegetation accidentally rubbing off the tags can be resolved. Maranga et al. 2003 uses a AAA pheromone very differently, combined with CO_{2} in a site on the ground instead of on a host. Over the next three hours, 90% of A. variegatum within a close distance had travelled to the attracting site and those further away were somewhat attracted. Combining Maranga's technique with an acaricide protects a corral or feedlot area.
