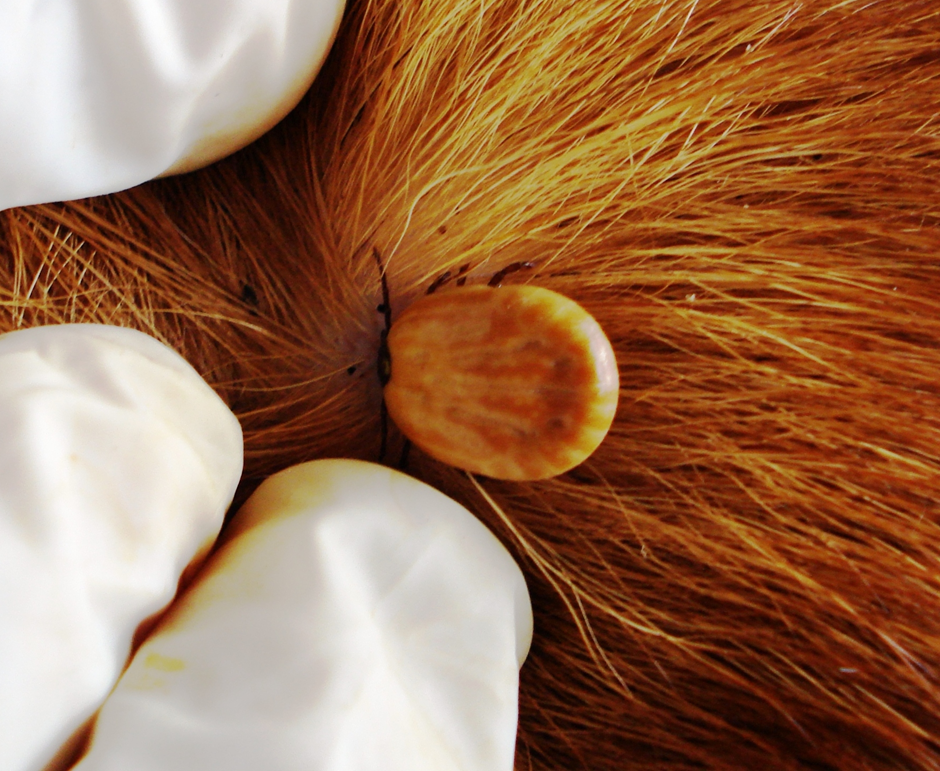
- A female of Amblyomma ovale firmly attached to and feeding on a dog.

Scientific classification
- Kingdom: Animalia
- Phylum: Arthropoda
- Subphylum: Chelicerata
- Class: Arachnida
- Order: Ixodida
- Family: Ixodidae
- Genus: Amblyomma; Koch, 1844

Type species
- Acarus cajennensis Fabricius, 1787

Species
- 135 extant, 2 extinct, see text.

= Amblyomma =

Amblyomma Temporal range: Cenomanian–present

Genus of ticks

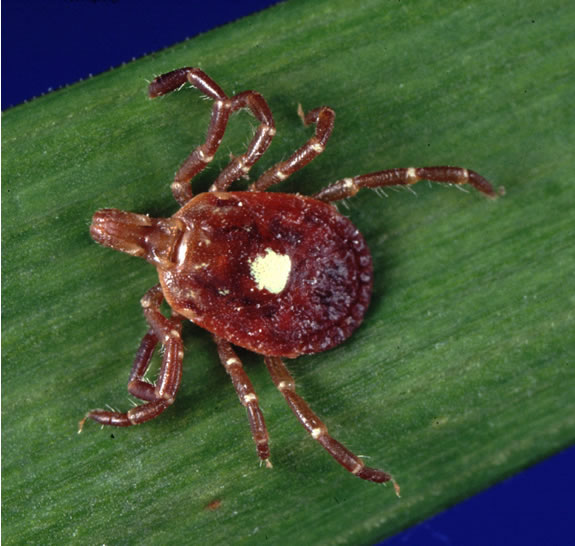
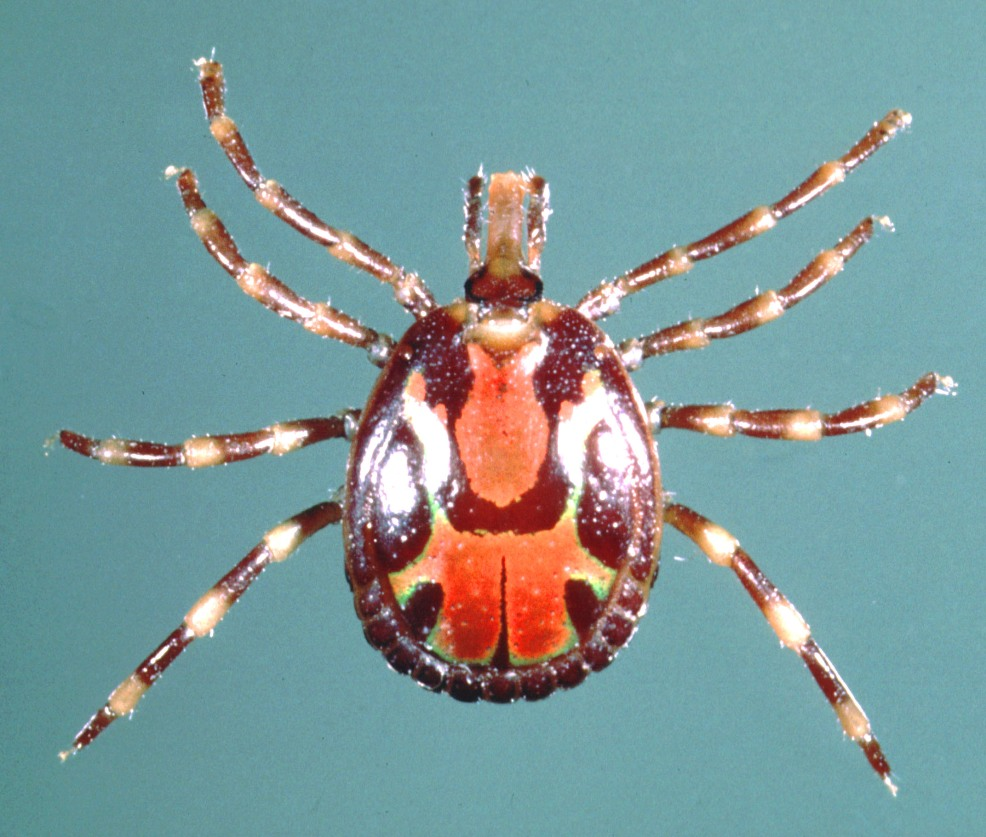
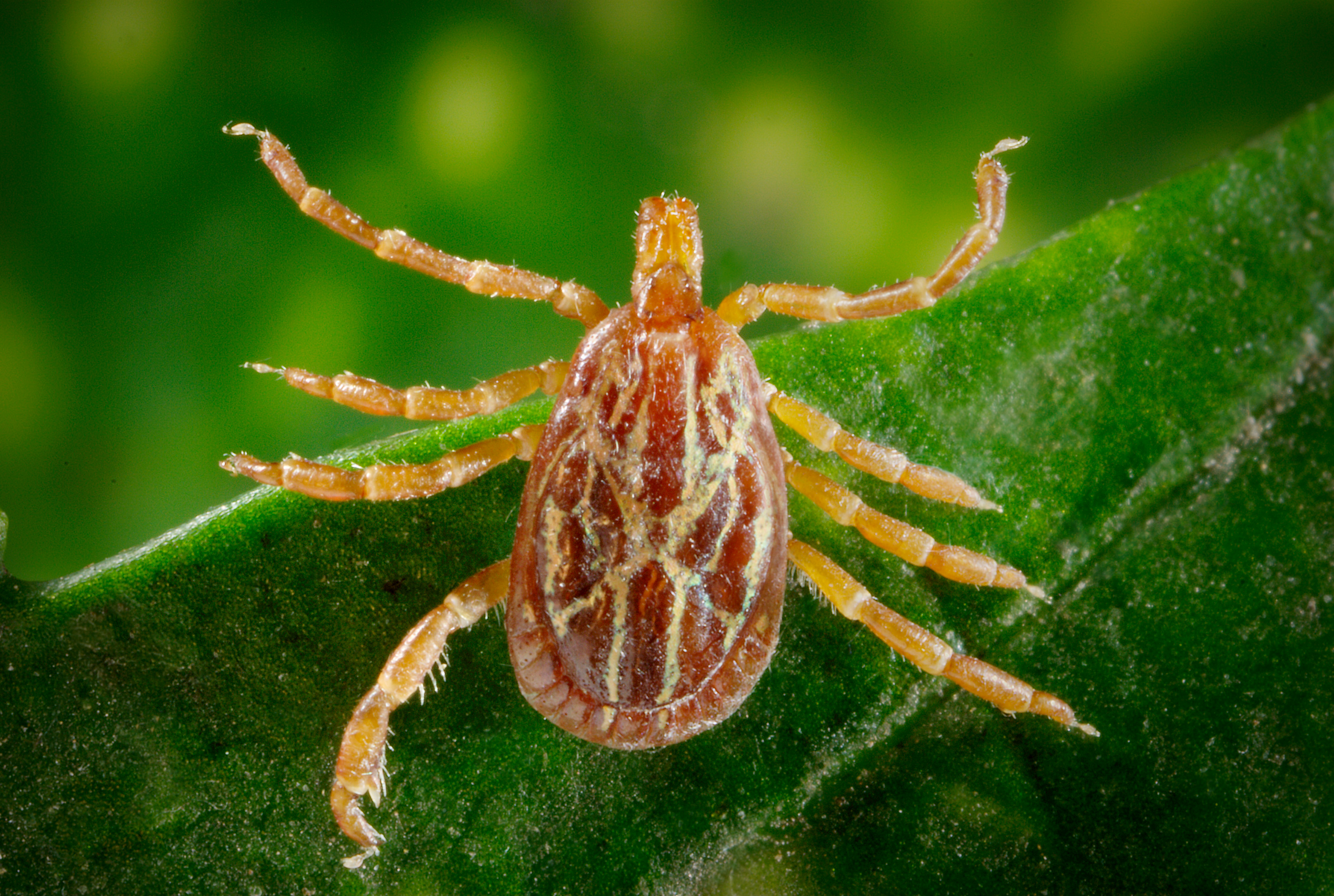
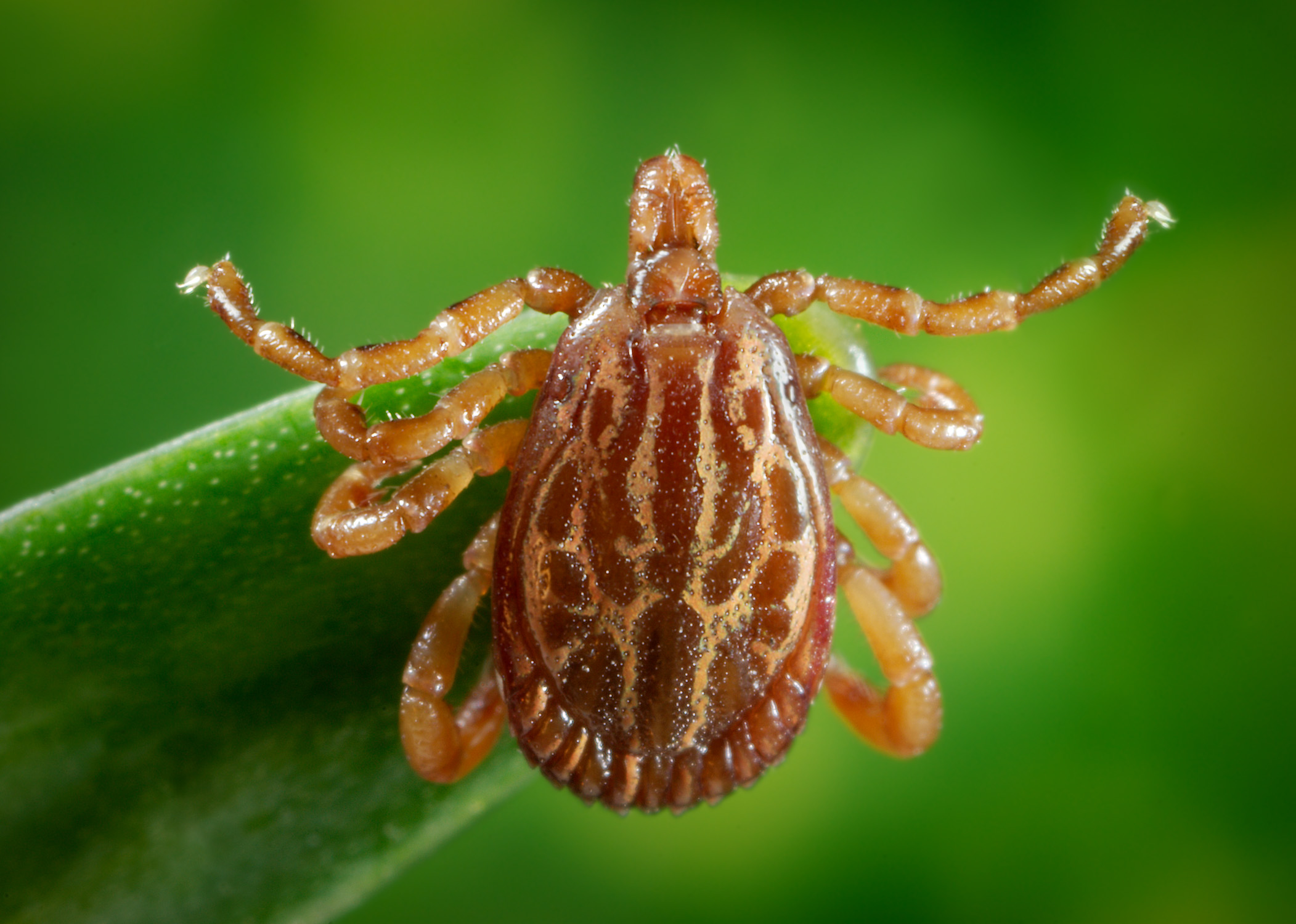
Amblyomma americanum, Amblyomma variegatum, Amblyomma maculatum, Amblyomma triste.
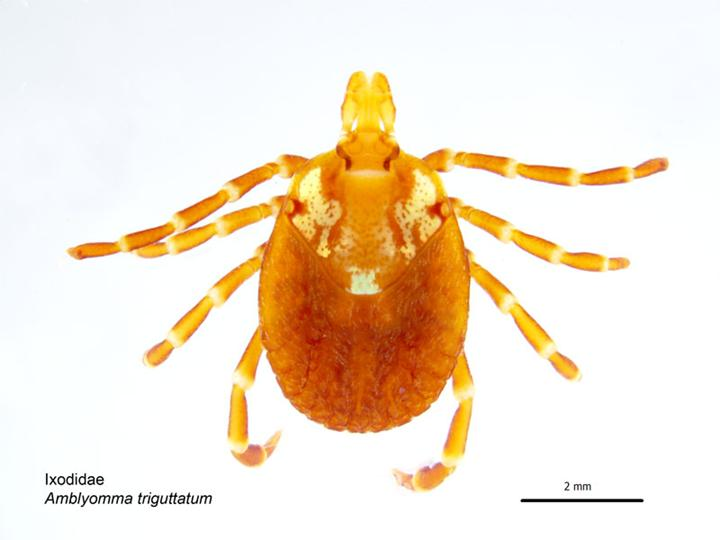
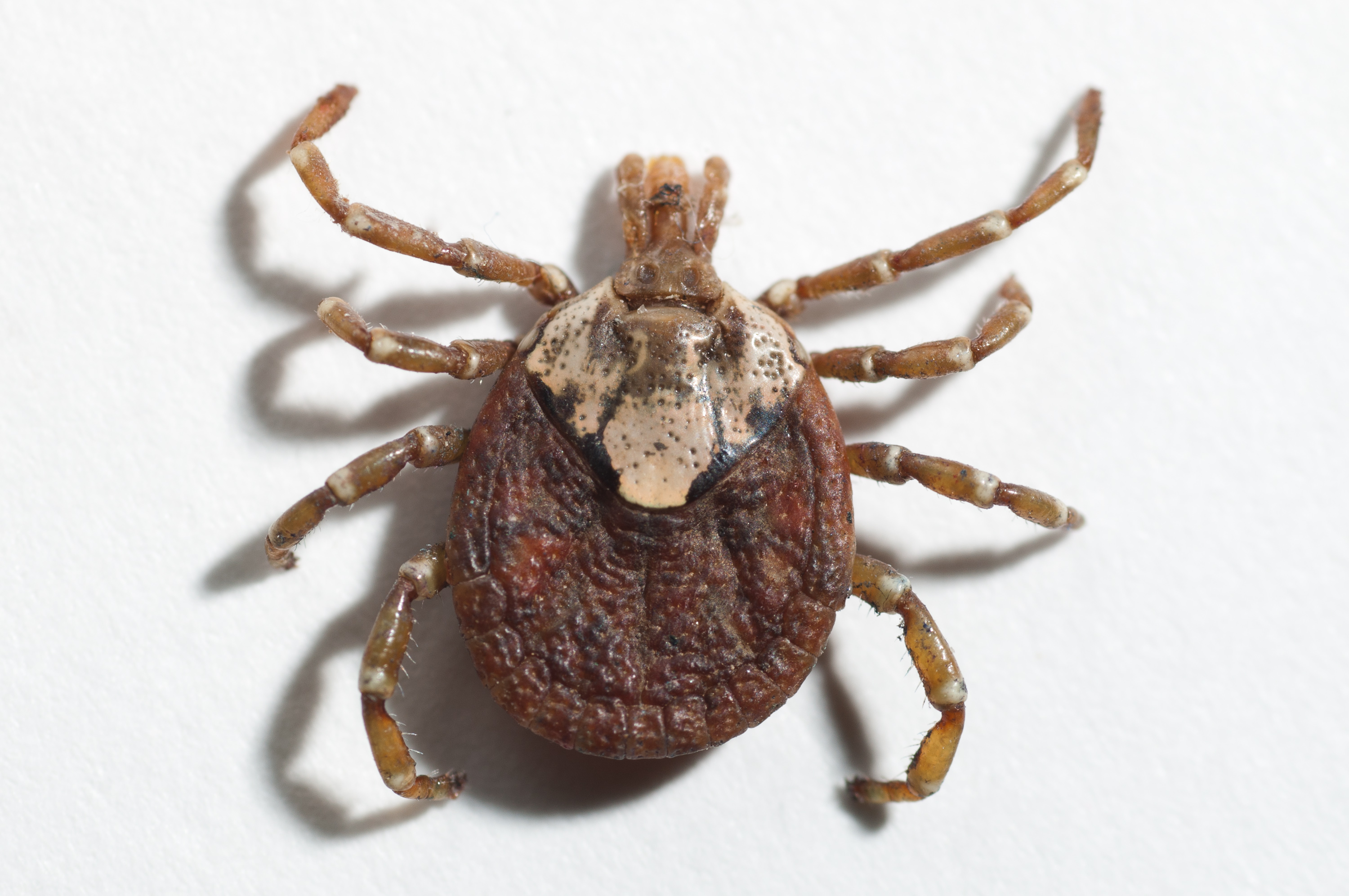
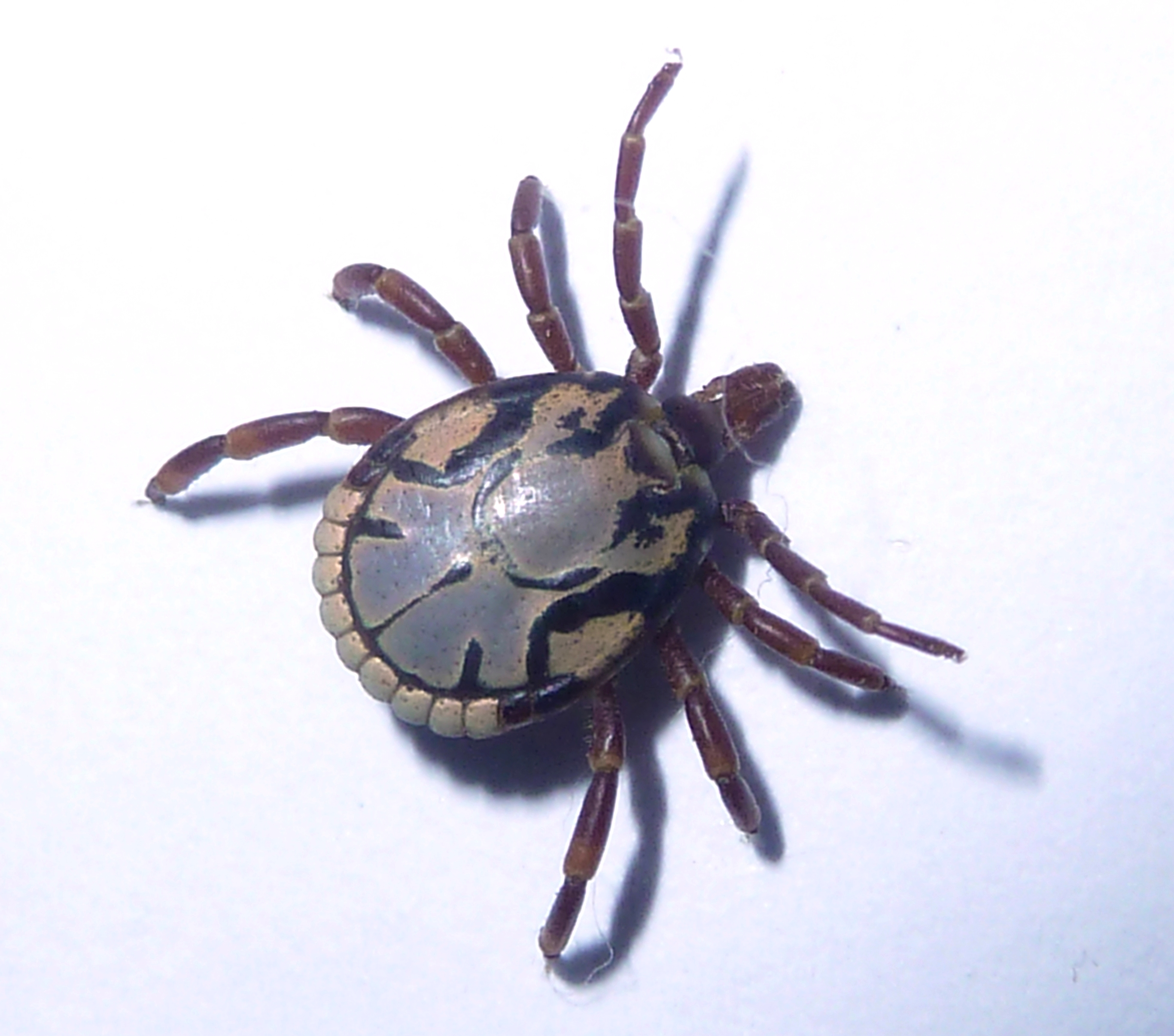
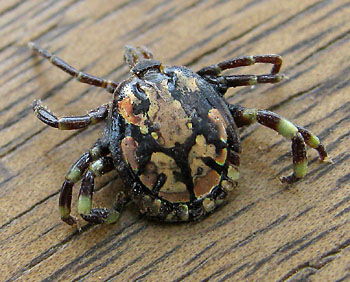
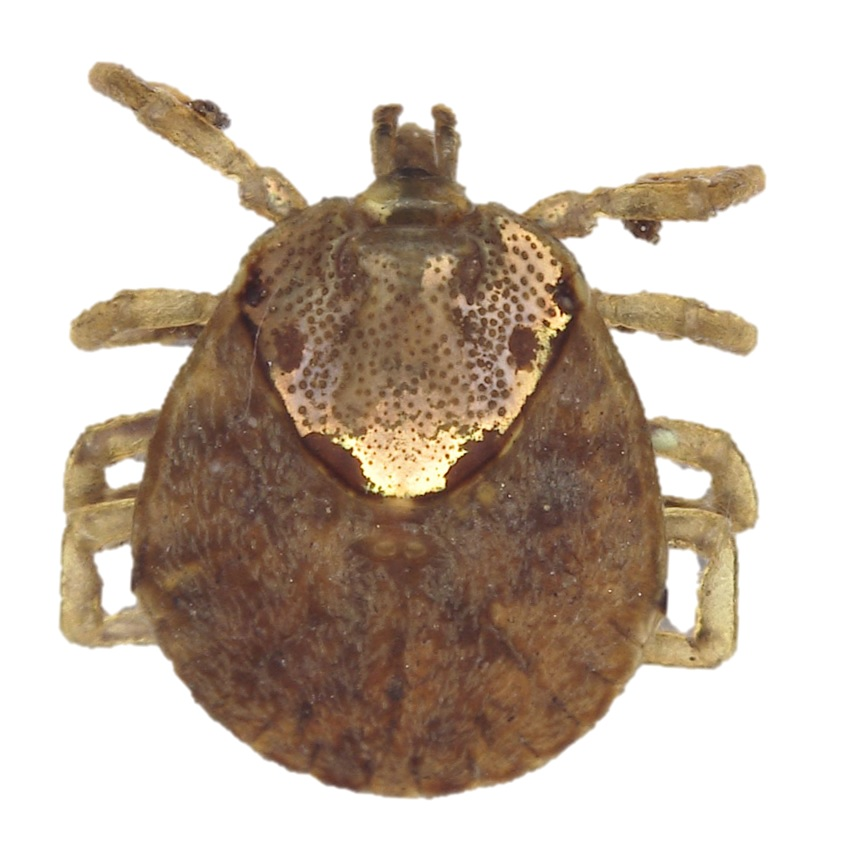
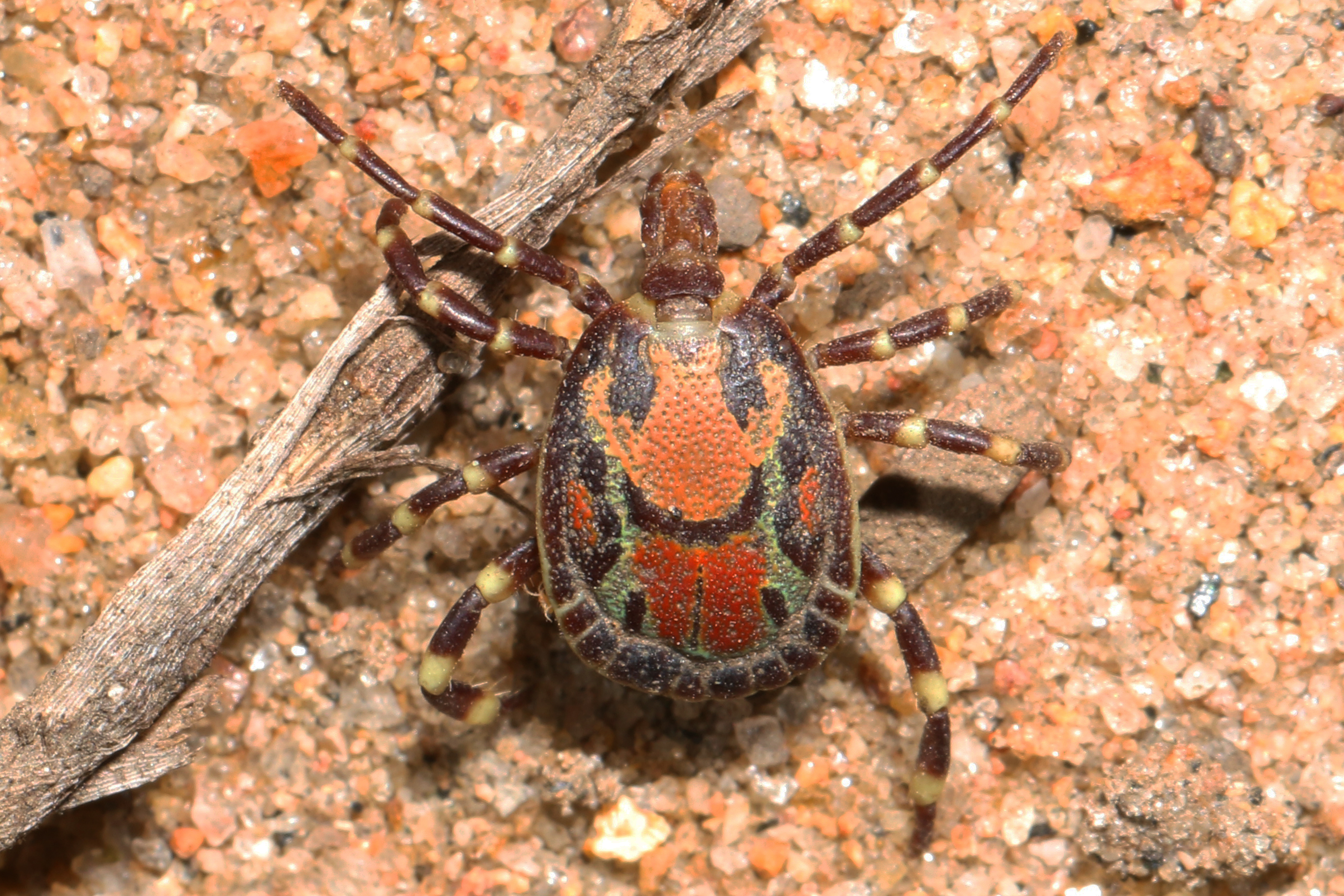
Amblyomma triguttatum, Amblyomma testudinarium, Amblyomma hebraeum, Amblyomma gemma, Amblyomma kappa, Amblyomma pomposum.
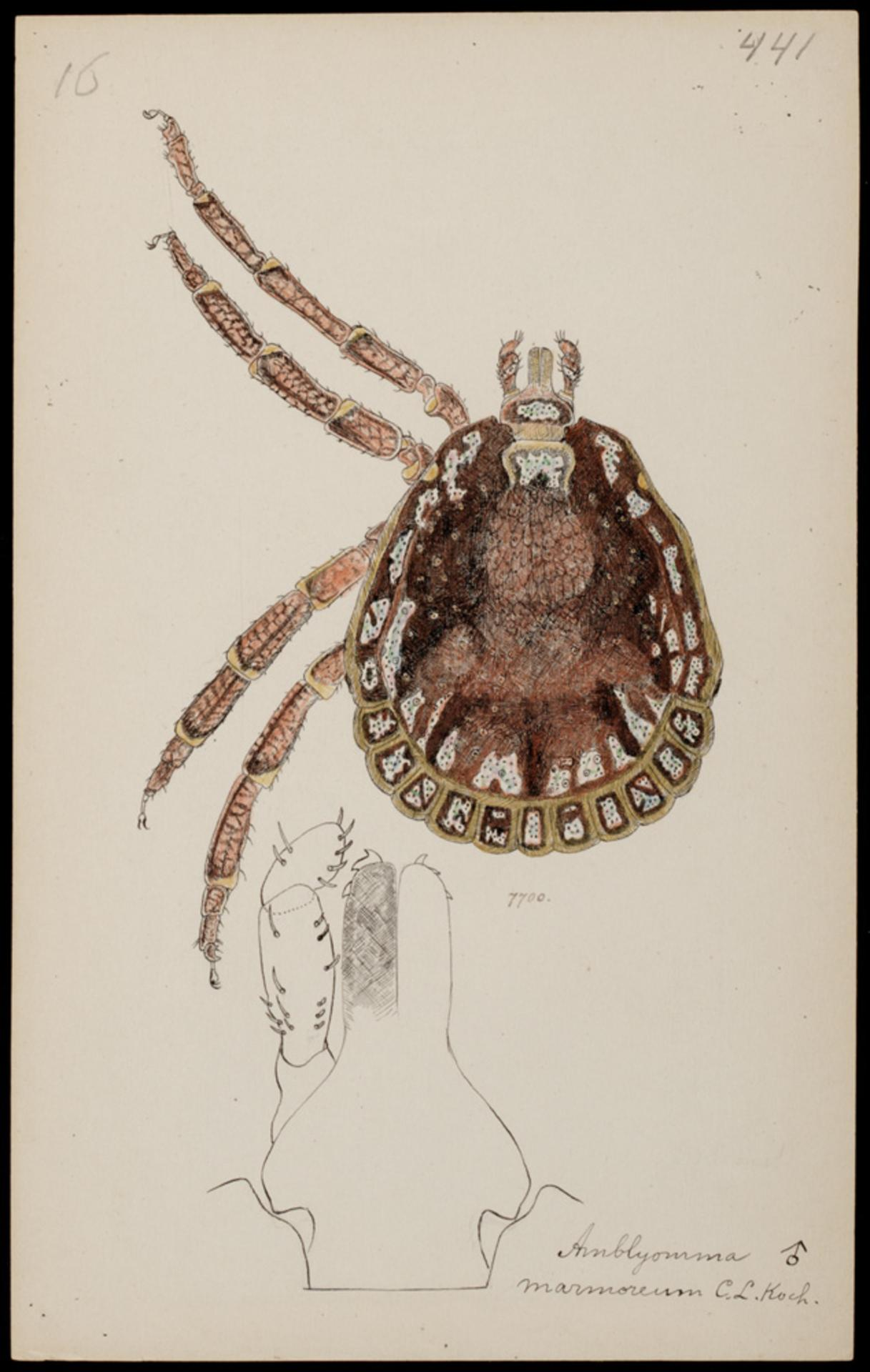
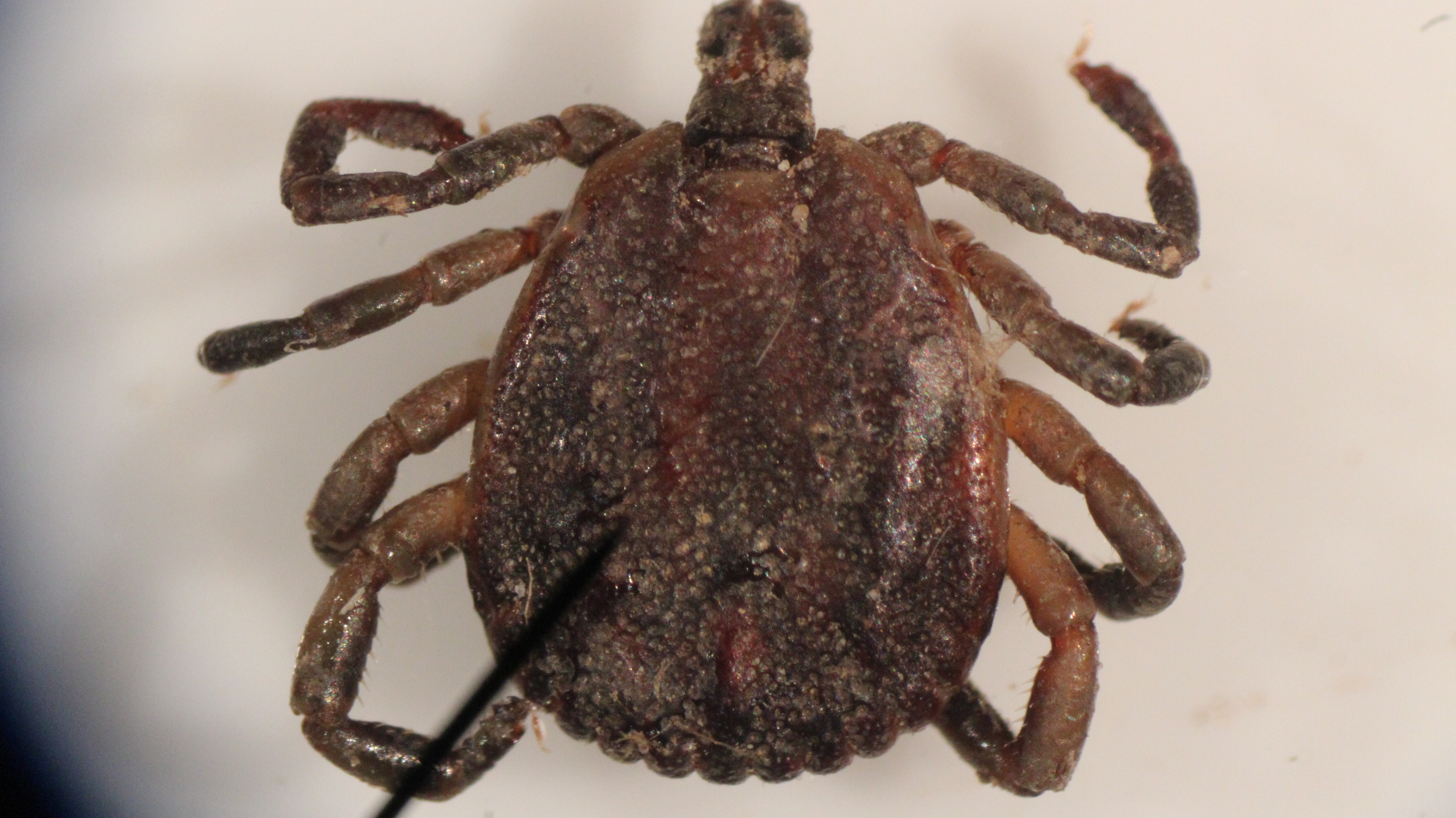
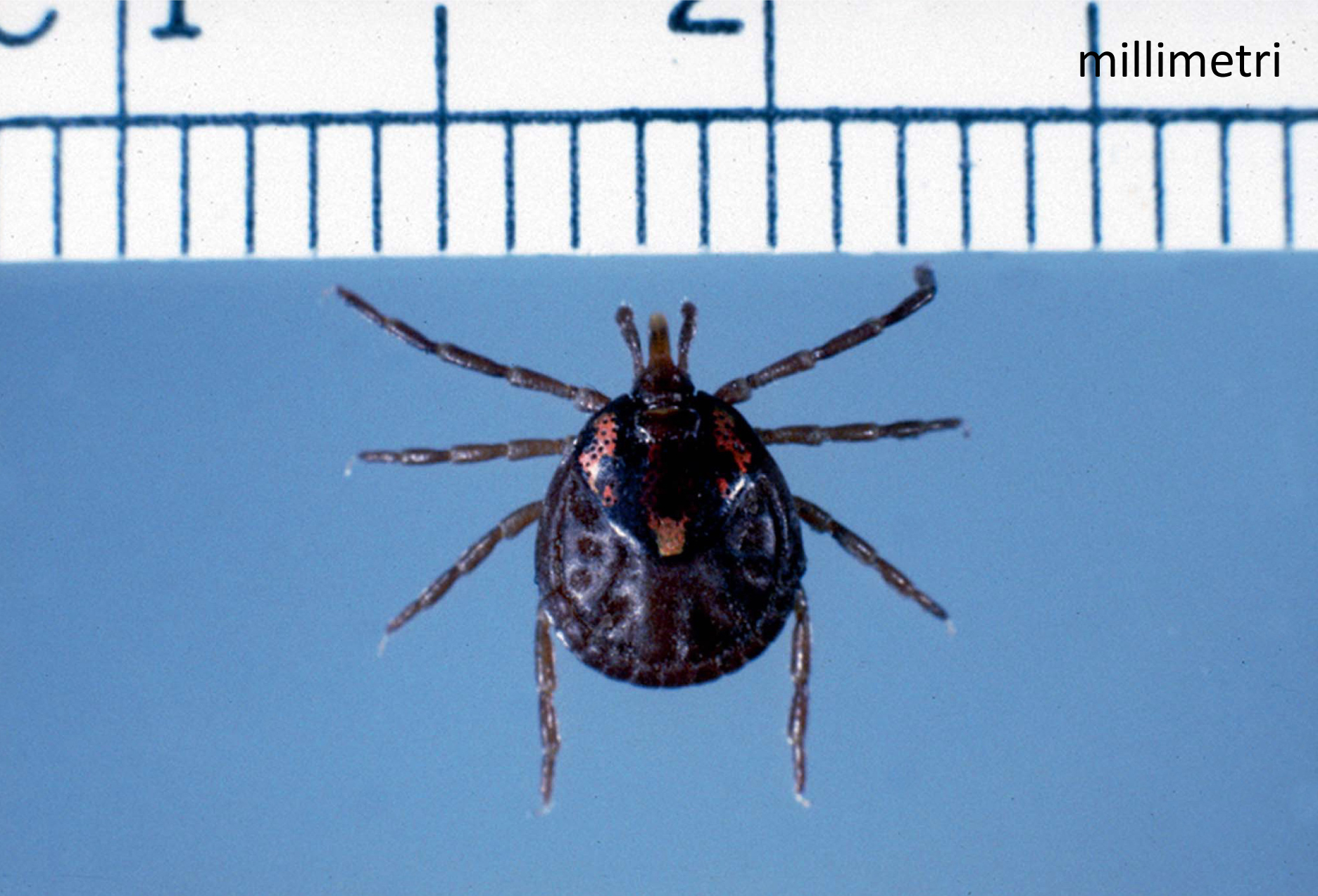
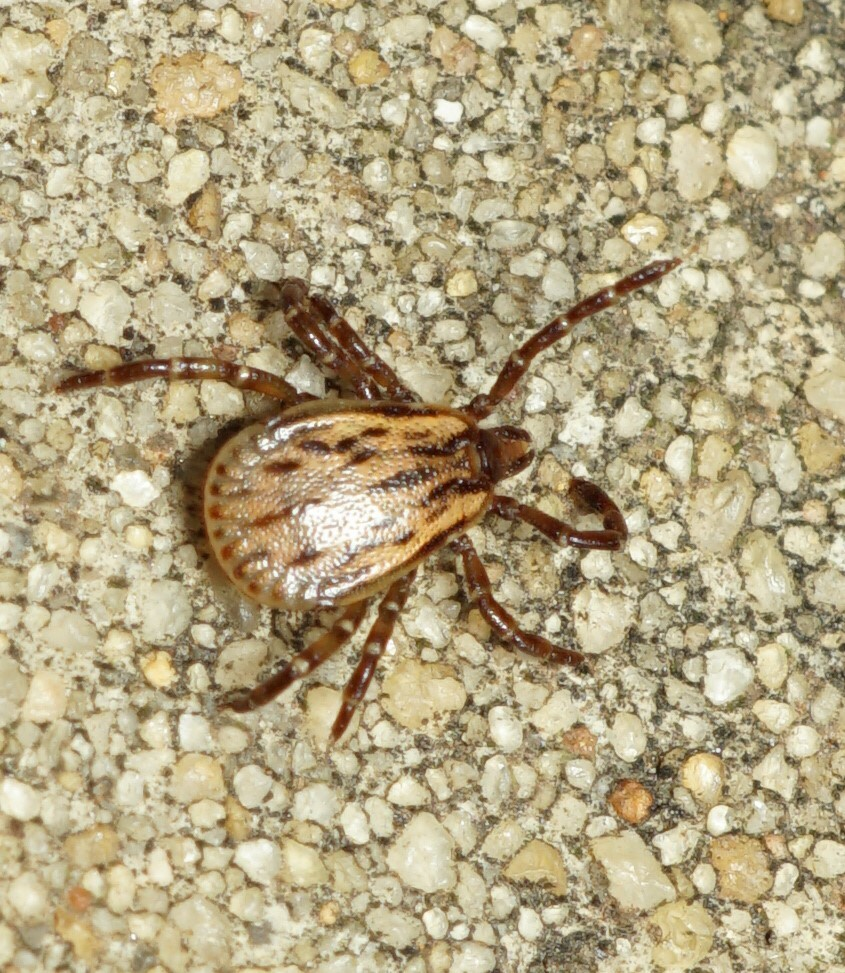
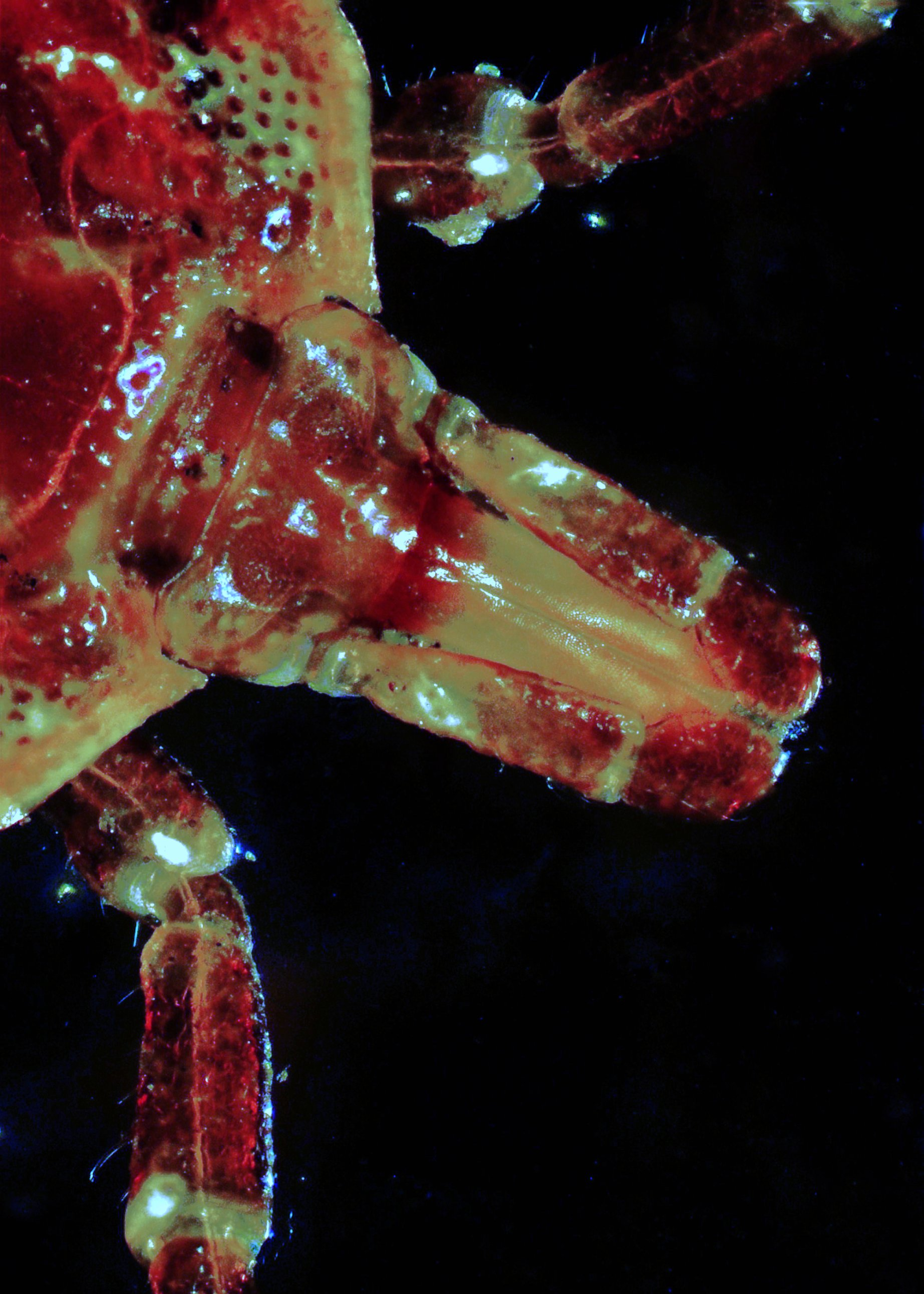
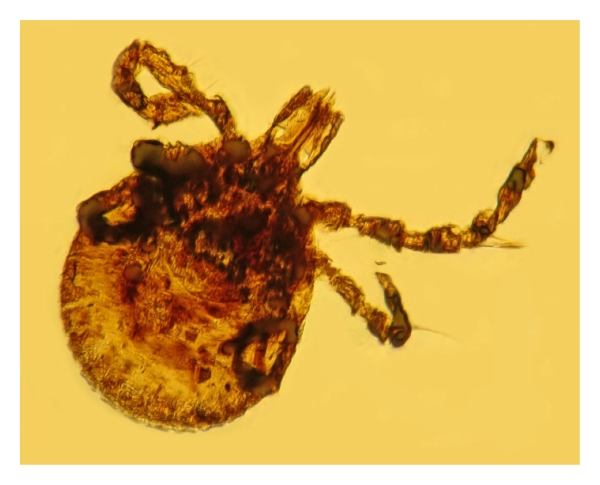
Amblyomma marmoreum, Amblyomma scalpturatum, Amblyomma Supinoi, Amblyomma tigrinum, A. americanum mouthparts, Amblyomma near testudinis fossil.

Amblyomma, also known as the Bont Ticks, are a genus of hard ticks. Some are disease vectors, such as of Rocky Mountain spotted fever in United States or ehrlichiosis in Brazil.

This genus is the third largest in the family Ixodidae, after Ixodes and Haemaphysalis, with its species primarily occupying the torrid zones of all the continents. The centre of species diversity is on the American continent, where half of all the species occur. On this continent, Amblyomma species reach far beyond the torrid zone, up to the 40th parallel in the Northern Hemisphere, to the 50th parallel in the Southern Hemisphere, and even reaches the alpine zone of the Andes. They also occur in Eurasia, Africa and Australia.

== Evolutionary history and systematics ==
Amblyomma is the largest genus in the Amblyocephalus lineage, and the only member of the Amblyomminae subfamily. Modelling suggests the most recent common ancestor (MRCA) of the Amblyocephalus originated approximately 48 million years ago, and the genus began to diversify approximately 37 ma. The Amblyomma MRCA likely evolved in a region between South America and Antarctica, lending credence to an out-of-Antarctica hypothesis for the genus' origin. A genetic divide in modern lineages between Australian Amblyomma and Amblyomma from the rest of the world supports the idea that the genus diverged in two directions out of Antarctica, with one lineage dispersing into Australian Gondwana, and another into South American Gondwana, at the end of the Eocene.

- Ixodidae
  - - Prostriata
      Ixodes
  - Metastriata
    - Robertsicus
    - - Amblyocephalus
        - Amblyomma
        - - Dermacentor
          - - Rhipicentor
            - - Hyalomma
              - Rhipicephalus
      - Haematobothrion
        - - Cryptocroton
          - Bothriocroton
        - - Archaeocroton
          - Alloceraea
        - Haemaphysalis

Ixodidae cladogram after Barker et al., (2024)

The genus has historically been large, and highly varied, morphologically, making circumscription criteria in accordance with genetic phylogenies difficult to define. Following the 2020 and 2024 excision of Africaniella and Cryptocroton species, respectively, Amblyomma is now monophyletic. Many species complexes remain unresolved, however. Additionally, most Amblyomma subgenera remain polyphyletic (Cernyomma, Anastosiella, Haemalastor, Xiphiastor, Adenopleura, Aponomma, and Dermiomma), with only Amblyomma (Amblyomma) and Amblyomma (Walkeriana) being monophyletic.

== Description ==
Amblyomma species are medium to large, often ornamented ticks. They are subcircular to elliptical, with subpentagonal basis capituli and elongate mouthparts. Most species have eyes, except for those of the subgenus Amblyomma (Aponomma). Lateral grooves and festoons are usually distinct. Amblyomma ticks parasitise a wide range of vertebrates, except for amphibians.

The internal anatomy of Amblyomma species has been described in detail in a few species, including Amblyomma maculatum and Amblyomma variegatum.

== Species ==
- Amblyomma albolimbatum Neumann, 1907
- Amblyomma albopictum Neumann 1899
- Amblyomma americanum Linnaeus, 1758 – lone star tick
- Amblyomma anicornuta Apanaskevich & Apanaskevich, 2018
- Amblyomma antillorum Kohls 1969
- Amblyomma arcanum Karsch, 1879
- Amblyomma argentinae Neumann, 1905
- Amblyomma astrion Dönitz, 1909
- Amblyomma aureolatum Pallas, 1772
- Amblyomma auricularium Conil, 1878
- Amblyomma australiense Neumann, 1905
- Amblyomma babirussae Schulze, 1933
- Amblyomma beaurepairei Vogelsang & Santos Dias 1953
- Amblyomma boeroi Nava et al., 2009
- Amblyomma boulengeri Hirst & Hirst, 1910
- Amblyomma brasiliense Aragão, 1908
- Amblyomma breviscutatum Neumann, 1899
- Amblyomma cajennense Fabricius, 1787
- Amblyomma calabyi Roberts, 1963
- Amblyomma calcaratum Neumann, 1899
- Amblyomma chabaudi Rageau, 1964
- Amblyomma clypeolatum Neumann, 1899
- Amblyomma coelebs Neumann, 1899
- Amblyomma cohaerens Dönitz, 1909
- Amblyomma compressum Macalister, 1872
- Amblyomma cordiferum Neumann, 1899
- Amblyomma crassipes Neumann, 1901
- Amblyomma crassum Robinson, 1926
- Amblyomma crenatum Neumann 1899
- Amblyomma cruciferum Neumann, 1901
- Amblyomma darwini Hirst & Hirst, 1910
- Amblyomma dissimile Koch 1844
- Amblyomma dubitatum Neumann 1899
- Amblyomma eburneum Gerstäcker, 1873
- Amblyomma echidnae Roberts 1953
- Amblyomma exornatum Koch, 1844
- Amblyomma extraoculatum Neumann 1899
- Amblyomma falsomarmoreum Tonelli-Rondelli, 1935
- Amblyomma fimbriatum Koch, 1844
- Amblyomma flavomaculatum Lucas, 1846
- Amblyomma fulvum Neumann, 1899
- Amblyomma fuscolineatum Lucas, 1847
- Amblyomma fuscum Neumann, 1907
- Amblyomma geayi Neumann, 1899
- Amblyomma gemma Dönitz, 1909
- Amblyomma geochelone Durden, Keirans & Smith, 2002
- Amblyomma geoemydae Cantor, 1847
- Amblyomma gervaisi Lucas, 1847
- Amblyomma glauerti Keirans, King & Sharrad, 1994
- Amblyomma goeldii Neumann 1899
- Amblyomma hadanii Nava et al., 2014
- Amblyomma hainanense Teng, 1981
- Amblyomma hebraeum Koch, 1844
- Amblyomma helvolum Koch, 1844
- Amblyomma hirtum Neumann, 1906
- Amblyomma humerale Koch, 1844
- Amblyomma incisum Neumann, 1906
- Amblyomma inopinatum (Santos Dias, 1989)
- Amblyomma inornatum Banks, 1909
- Amblyomma integrum Karsch, 1879
- Amblyomma interandinum Nava et al., 2014
- Amblyomma javanense Supino, 1897
- Amblyomma kappa Kwak, 2024
- Amblyomma komodoense Oudemans, 1928
- Amblyomma kraneveldi Anastos, 1956
- Amblyomma latepunctatum Tonelli Rondelli, 1939
- Amblyomma latum Koch, 1844
- Amblyomma lepidum Dönitz, 1909
- Amblyomma limbatum Neumann, 1899
- Amblyomma loculosum Neumann, 1907
- Amblyomma longirostre Koch, 1844
- Amblyomma macfarlandi Keirans, Hoogstraal & Clifford, 1973
- Amblyomma macropi Roberts, 1953
- Amblyomma maculatum Koch, 1844
- Amblyomma marmoreum Koch, 1844
- Amblyomma mixtum Koch, 1844
- Amblyomma moreliae Koch, 1867
- Amblyomma moyi Roberts, 1953
- Amblyomma multipunctum Neumann, 1899
- Amblyomma naponense Packard, 1869
- Amblyomma neumanni Ribaga 1902
- Amblyomma nitidum Hirst & Hirst, 1910
- Amblyomma nodosum Neumann, 1899
- Amblyomma nuttalli Dönitz, 1909
- Amblyomma oblongoguttatum Koch, 1844
- Amblyomma ovale Koch, 1844
- Amblyomma pacae Aragão, 1911
- Amblyomma pakhtunensis Ali, Khan, Chitimia-Dobler & Mans 2024
- Amblyomma parkeri Fonseca & Aragao, 1952
- Amblyomma parvitarsum Neumann, 1901
- Amblyomma parvum Aragão, 1908
- Amblyomma patinoi Nava, et al., 2014
- Amblyomma pattoni Neumann, 1910
- Amblyomma paulopunctatum Neumann 1899
- Amblyomma pecarium Dunn, 1933
- Amblyomma personatum Neumann, 1901
- Amblyomma pictum Neumann, 1906
- Amblyomma pilosum Neumann, 1899
- Amblyomma pomposum Dönitz, 1909
- Amblyomma postoculatum Neumann, 1899
- Amblyomma pseudoconcolor Aragão, 1908
- Amblyomma pseudoparvum Guglielmone, Mangold & Keirans, 1990
- Amblyomma quadricavum Schulze, 1941
- Amblyomma rhinocerotis de Geer, 1778
- Amblyomma robinsoni Warburton 1927
- Amblyomma romarioi Martins, Luz and Labruna, 2019
- Amblyomma romitii Tonelli Rondelli, 1939
- Amblyomma rotundatum Koch 1844
- Amblyomma sabanerae Stoll, 1894
- Amblyomma scalpturatum Neumann, 1906
- Amblyomma sculptum Berlese, 1888
- Amblyomma scutatum Neumann, 1899
- Amblyomma soembawense Anastos, 1956
- Amblyomma sparsum Neumann, 1899
- Amblyomma splendidum Giebel, 1877
- Amblyomma squamosum Kohls, 1953
- Amblyomma supinoi Neumann, 1905
- Amblyomma sylvaticum de Geer, 1778
- Amblyomma tapirellum Dunn, 1933
- Amblyomma tenellum Koch, 1844
- Amblyomma testudinarium Koch, 1844
- Amblyomma tholloni Neumann, 1899
- Amblyomma tigrinum Koch 1844
- Amblyomma tonelliae Nava et al., 2014
- Amblyomma torrei Pérez Vigueras, 1934
- Amblyomma triguttatum Koch 1844
- Amblyomma trimaculatum Lucas, 1878
- Amblyomma triste Koch 1844
- Amblyomma tuberculatum Marx, 1894
- Amblyomma usingeri Keirans, Hoogstraal & Clifford, 1973
- Amblyomma varanense Supino, 1897
- Amblyomma variegatum Fabricius 1798
- Amblyomma varium Koch, 1844
- Amblyomma vikirri Keirans, Bull & Duffield, 1996
- Amblyomma williamsi Banks, 1924
- Amblyomma yucumense Krawczak, Martins & Labruna, 2015

=== Fossil species ===
- †Amblyomma arawakan Milde, Martins, Harms, Hammel, Dunlop, Kotthoff & Chitimia-dobler, 2025. Dominican amber, Dominican Republic, Miocene.
- †Amblyomma birmitum Chitimia-Dobler et al., 2017. Burmese amber, Myanmar, Cenomanian.
- †Amblyomma sp. "near testudinis" Lane & Poinar, 1986. Dominican amber, Dominican Republic, Miocene.
