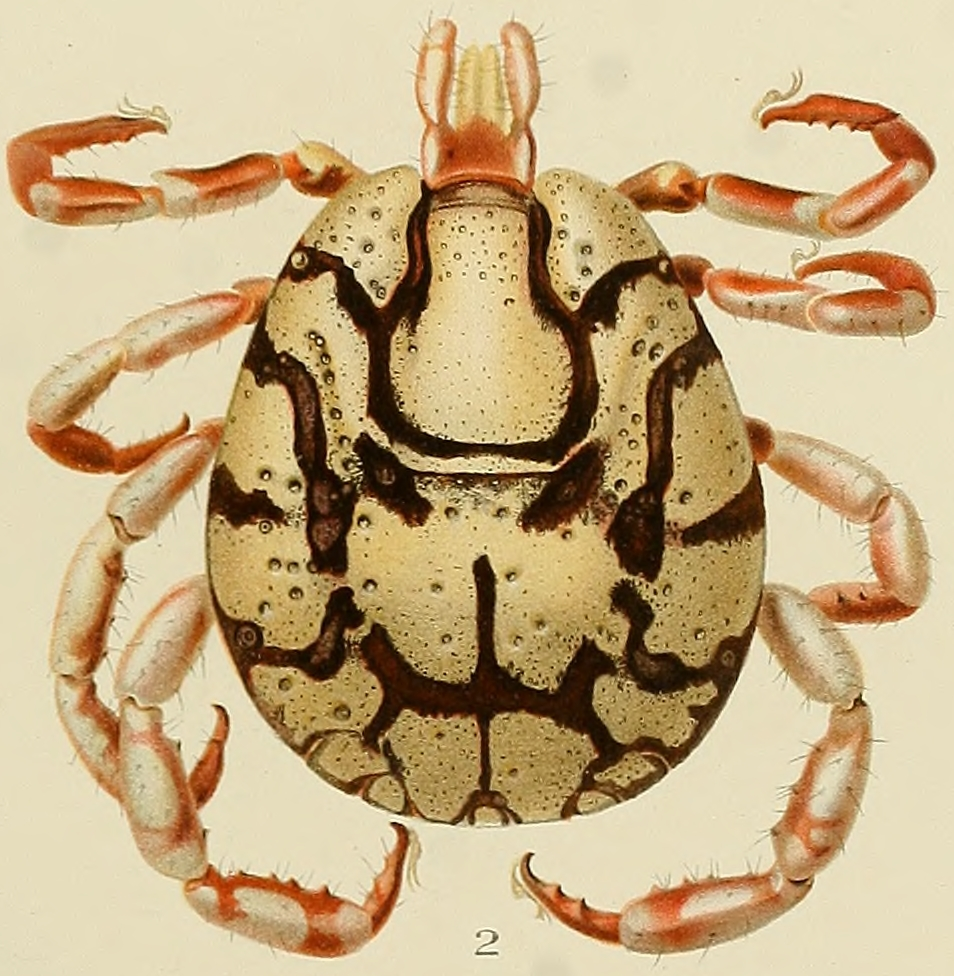
- Male

Scientific classification
- Kingdom: Animalia
- Phylum: Arthropoda
- Subphylum: Chelicerata
- Class: Arachnida
- Order: Ixodida
- Family: Ixodidae
- Genus: Cosmiomma; Schulze, 1919
- Species: C. hippopotamensis

Binomial name
- Cosmiomma hippopotamensis Denny, 1843

= Cosmiomma =

Genus of ticks

Cosmiomma is a genus of ticks first discovered by Paul Schulze in 1919. It is monospecific, being represented by the single species Cosmiomma hippopotamensis. It was first described in 1843 by Henry Denny from specimens collected from a hippopotamus in Southern Africa, and has been called "one of the most unusual, beautiful, and rare tick species known to the world."

== Taxonomy and systematics ==
The taxonomic position of the genus Cosmiomma has been unstable since the male and female of the type species were first described as two separate species. As late as 1997, two published studies based on the type species' morphology concluded separately that Cosmiomma was most closely related to Rhipicephalus species ticks and that Cosmiomma was more closely related to Dermacentor species.

The name "cosmiomma" is believed to be derived from the Greek “cosmima,” meaning jewelry and “omma,” meaning eye.

== Description ==
Adults have an ornate black pattern on their pale yellowish scutum, and light-colored mottling on the dorsal surfaces of their legs. They are relatively large ticks, averaging 8.5 mm (0.3 inch) in length and 6 mm (0.2 inch) in breadth. They are morphologically similar to, but uniquely different from, certain species of Amblyomma, Dermacentor, and Hyalomma genera of ticks.

== Distribution and habitat ==
Cosmiomma hippopotamensis have been recorded from widely separated localities in east and southern Africa, including Namibia, Angola, and Kenya. They have been collected from the common hippopotamus and the black rhinoceros, the latter of which is believed to be its most likely primary host. Questing ticks have also been collected from vegetation.
