= Rhipicentor =

Scientific classification
- Kingdom: Animalia
- Phylum: Arthropoda
- Subphylum: Chelicerata
- Class: Arachnida
- Order: Ixodida
- Family: Ixodidae
- Subfamily: Rhipicephalinae
- Genus: Rhipicentor; Nuttall & Warburton, 1908

Type species
- Rhipicentor bicornis Nuttall & Warburton, 1908^{host unknown, North Nyassa (Malawi)}

Genus of ticks

Rhipicentor is an African genus of hard ticks. The genus parasitises a range of domestic and sylvatic Carnivora and Mammalia hosts. The genus forms part of the Rhipicephalinae subfamily, along with Dermacentor, Margaropus, Rhipicephalus, Hyalomma and Nosomma. There are no records of Rhipicentor human parasitism, but R. nuttalli can cause tick paralysis in dogs.

Rhipicentor forms part of the Rhipicephalinae subfamily, in the broader Amblyocephalus clade of the Ixodidae.

- Ixodidae
  - - Prostriata
      Ixodes
  - Metastriata
    - Robertsicus
    - - Amblyocephalus
        - Amblyomma
        - - Dermacentor
          - - Rhipicentor
            - - Hyalomma
              - Rhipicephalus
      - Haematobothrion
        - - Cryptocroton
          - Bothriocroton
        - - Archaeocroton
          - Alloceraea
        - Haemaphysalis

Ixodidae cladogram after Barker et al., (2024)

== Species ==
- Rhipicentor bicornis Nuttall & Warburton, 1908
- Rhipicentor nuttalli Cooper, Cantab & Robinson, 1908

== Etymology ==
The name "Rhipicentor" is a portmanteau. In their description of the genus, Nuttall and Warburton commented that Rhipicentor ticks resemble Rhipicephalus dorsally, and Dermacentor ventrally, inspiring the name.
