= Sweating sickness (cattle) =

Tick-borne disease

Sweating sickness is "an acute, febrile, tickborne toxicosis characterized mainly by a profuse, moist eczema and hyperemia of the skin and visible mucous membranes." It affects cattle, mainly calves, mostly in southern and eastern Africa. It is caused by toxins that develop in some ticks of the Hyalomma truncatum species.

== Etiology ==
The main cause of the sweating sickness is an epitheliotropic toxin produced by females of certain strains of Hyalomma truncatum. The toxin develops in the tick organism, not in the vertebrate host.

This disease widely spread in eastern, central and southern Africa, Sri Lanka and Southern India.

== Symptoms ==
The incubation period of the disease is 4–11 days, after signs appear suddenly - hyperthermia, anorexia, watering of the eyes and nose, hyperemia of the visible mucous membranes, salivation, necrosis of the oral mucosa, and hyperesthesia. The skin becomes hot and moist dermatitis developed, starting from the base of the ears, the axillae, groin, and perineum, then spread over the entire body. The skin becomes extremely sensitive and has a sour odor. Later, the hair and epidermis can be easily pulled off, exposing red, raw wounds. Skin becomes hard and cracked and can be affected by secondary infection.

Usually, the disease course is rapid, death may occur after a few days.

== Treatment ==
Removal of ticks, symptomatic treatment and good nursing care. Non-nephrotoxic antibiotics and anti-inflammatory preparations are used for healing of secondary infection. Immune serum can be an effective specific treatment.

== Prophylaxis ==
Prophylaxis of sweating sickness is based upon the elimination of the arthropods. The only effective way for the destruction of ticks is regular, systematic dipping or spraying combined with careful hand-dressing against infectious agents.
