= Margaropus reidi =

Scientific classification
- Domain: Eukaryota
- Kingdom: Animalia
- Phylum: Arthropoda
- Subphylum: Chelicerata
- Class: Arachnida
- Order: Ixodida
- Family: Ixodidae
- Genus: Margaropus
- Species: M. reidi

Binomial name
- Margaropus reidi Hoogstraal, 1956

Species of tick

Margaropus reidi, the Sudanese beady-legged tick, is an ixodid tick that is parasitic on the Northern giraffe (Giraffa camelopardalis) It is one of only three species in the genus Margaropus.

== Distribution ==
The type specimens were collected in Liednhom (or Lietnhom) on the south bank of the Jur River, and at Guar, in the Gual-Nyang Forest, Bahr el Ghazal, South Sudan.

== Description ==
First described by entomologist and parasitologist Harry Hoogstraal, M. reidi are small ticks, approximately 3.0 mm (0.12 inch) in length and 1.4 mm (0.05 inch) in width. They are dark reddish brown in color, with yellowish legs. M. reidi differs from the other two Margaropus species in that the setae around the posterior end of its body form a continuous fringe and, in comparison to Margaropus winthemi and Margaropus wileyi, its anal plates are more bluntly pointed.

== Habitat ==
The ecological requirements of M. reidi are similar to those of M. wileyi, but differ abruptly from those of M. winthemi. The vegetation in the area where it is found is largely broadleaf forests and woodlands with a mean annual rainfall of over 900 mm (35 inches), a mean monthly maximum temperature that falls below 30 °C (86 °F) for a relatively short period and exceeds 35 °C (95 °F) during the hot season.
