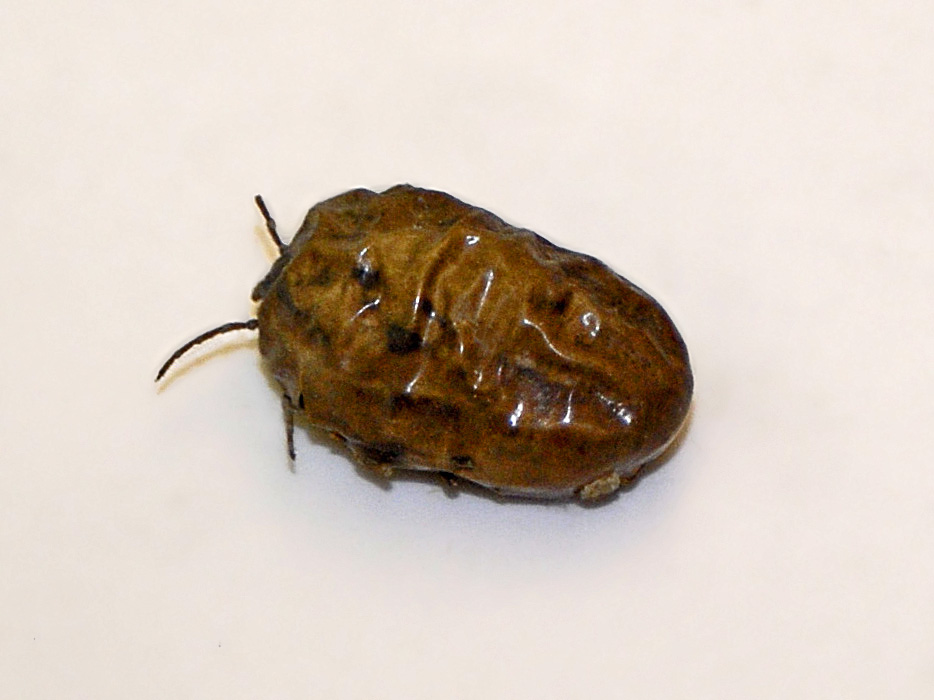
- Hyalomma dromedarii from Libya. Museum specimen

Scientific classification
- Kingdom: Animalia
- Phylum: Arthropoda
- Subphylum: Chelicerata
- Class: Arachnida
- Order: Ixodida
- Family: Ixodidae
- Genus: Hyalomma
- Species: H. dromedarii

Binomial name
- Hyalomma dromedarii C. L. Koch, 1844

Synonyms
- Ixodes camelinus Fischer von Waldheim, 1823; Ixodes arenicola Eichwald, 1830; Ixodes trilineatus Lucas, 1836; Ixodes cinctus Lucas, 1840 nec Fabricius, 1805; Hyalomma yakimovi Olenev, 1931

= Hyalomma dromedarii =

Species of tick

Hyalomma dromedarii is a species of hard-bodied ticks belonging to the family Ixodidae.

== Description ==
The dorsal shield (conscutum) of males can reach a length of 3.7–5.78 millimetres (0.146–0.228 in). These hard-bodied ticks are broadly oval in shape. The basic color is yellow- to red-brown.

This species is closely associated with camels, that are the main hosts of the adults, which may also parasitize other domestic animals. Nymphs and larvae are associated with the same hosts, but can also parasitize rodents, hedgehogs and birds.

This species is ascribed with spreading the virus that causes the life-threatening Crimean-Congo hemorrhagic fever. The bites cause the surrounding tissue to die and become necrotic. The dead tissue falls out of the body after a few days. The wounds look very serious, but usually heal without any intervention and do not generally become infected any further.

== Distribution ==
Hyalomma dromedarii is widespread in North Africa, the northern regions of West, Central, and East Africa, Arabia, Asia Minor, the Middle East, and Central and South Asia.

== Hosts ==
H. dromedarii is known from equids, camels and cattle.

== As a vector ==
=== African Horse Sickness ===
H. dromedarii can carry the African Horse Sickness Virus. Awad et al. 1981 and Salma et al. 1987 isolated the virus from individuals in Egypt, and find indications that they may vector it between horses. Awad further found it is transmitted transstadially, larva → nymph and nymph → adult, but not vertically.

=== Theileria ===
Samish and Pipono 1978 and Ica et al 2007 find the tick vectoring Theileria annulata between cattle. Hoogstraal et al 1981 find the same for T. camelensis and camels.

== Semiochemistry ==
Females secrete 2,6-Dichlorophenol/2,6-DCP as an attractant to males. (Several others of this genus are known to do the same.) Successful attraction is concentration dependent: For example, H. dromedarii males and H. anatolicum excavatum males are not attracted by the same concentrations. H. a. excavatum males are actually repelled by H. dromedarii concentrations.
