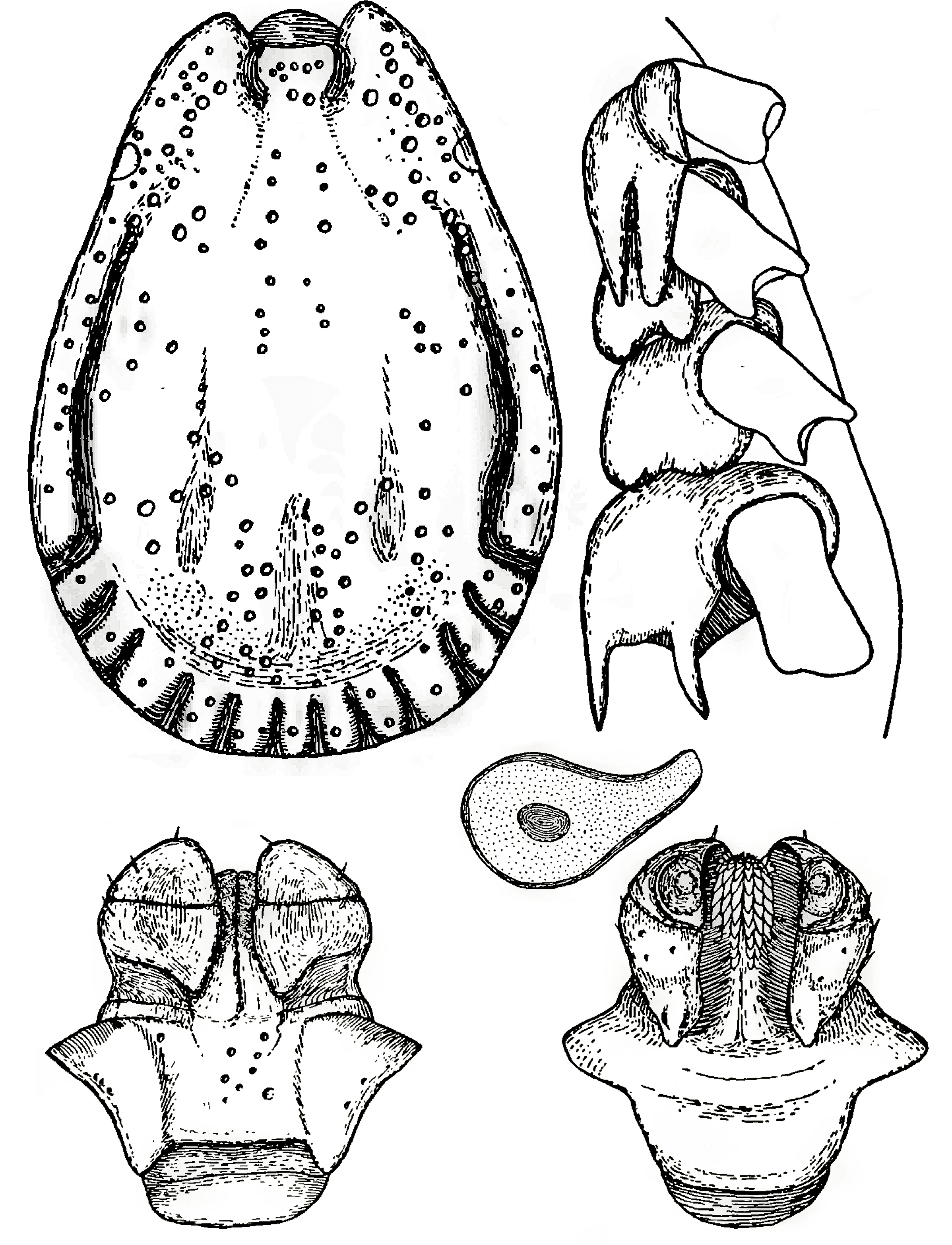
- Line-drawings of Rhipicentor nuttalli

Scientific classification
- Kingdom: Animalia
- Phylum: Arthropoda
- Subphylum: Chelicerata
- Class: Arachnida
- Order: Ixodida
- Family: Ixodidae
- Genus: Rhipicentor
- Species: R. nuttalli

Binomial name
- Rhipicentor nuttalli Cooper, Cantab & Robinson, 1908^{host unknown; Sandown, Rhodesia, South Africa}

Synonyms
- Rhipicentor vicinus (Neumann, 1908)

= Rhipicentor nuttalli =

African tick species

Rhipicentor nuttalli is a species of hard tick. It is found in Southern Africa, mainly feeding on domestic dogs, hedgehogs and porcupines. Infestation by this species can cause fatal paralysis in dogs.

== Morphology ==
Rhipicentor are large ticks, especially when engorged. They are inornate, with a short hypostome and palps. They have eyes, and distinct festoons. Coxae I and IV have very long external and internal spurs, close in coxa I and separated in coxa IV.

Cooper, Cantab and Robinson distinguish Rhipicentor nuttalli from Rhipicentor bicornis by the following:

"It is shorter and ‘squatter,’ has more numerous and larger punctations, many fine ones at the posterior end of the dorsum; the lateral angles of the basis capituli are not nearly so pronounced, the palps are longer and the lateral margins of articles 2 and 3 are more rounded. The spurs on coxae II. and III. are more separated and blunter, those on coxae IV. are sub-equal, further apart and the internal spur does not extend as far back as the anus"

== Ecology and parasitism ==
Rhipicentor nuttalli is found throughout South Africa, North Namibia, and in Botswana and Zimbabwe. It is known from domestic dogs, donkeys, hedgehogs, porcupines, genets, hyaenas and sylvatic felids such as cheetahs, lions and wildcats. The preferred adult host, however, is considered to be leopards. In South Africa, the species is most active during the warmer months of the year, as adults feed and lay eggs.

Instars feed on elephant shrews, although they are also a food source for the shrews. Elephant shrews, particularly Elephantulus myurus are preferred hosts by the instars of paralysis ticks in Africa, including Ixodes rubicundus and Rhipicephalus warburtoni, in addition to Rhipicentor nuttalli. While human parasitism has not been recorded, the species can cause fatal tick paralysis in domestic dogs, similar to Ixodes holocyclus in Australia, or Dermacentor variabilis in North America.

== Systematics and etymology ==
Rhipicentor nuttalli is one of two species of Rhipicentor, the other being the type species, Rhipicentor bicornis. The name "nuttalli" is after George Nuttall, a pre-eminent parasitologist, who described much of early tick systematics. Along with Cecil Warburton, he described the genus Rhipicentor.
