= Rhipicephalus hoogstraali =

Scientific classification
- Domain: Eukaryota
- Kingdom: Animalia
- Phylum: Arthropoda
- Subphylum: Chelicerata
- Class: Arachnida
- Order: Ixodida
- Family: Ixodidae
- Genus: Rhipicephalus
- Species: R. hoogstraali

Binomial name
- Rhipicephalus hoogstraali Kolonin, 2009

Species of tick

Rhipicephalus hoogstraali is a tick found in Djibouti and Somalia. First recognized by Harry Hoogstraal as Rhipicephalus longicoxatus based on an incomplete published description, after discovery of the holotype of R. longicoxatus, it was described and named to honor Hoogstraal in 2009.

The specific epithet is not universally accepted as valid, because the species was not described according to the accepted rules of the International Code of Zoological Nomenclature.

== Hosts ==
Rhipicephalus hoogstraali parasitizes sheep, goats, camels, and cattle.

== See also ==
- Ticks of domestic animals
