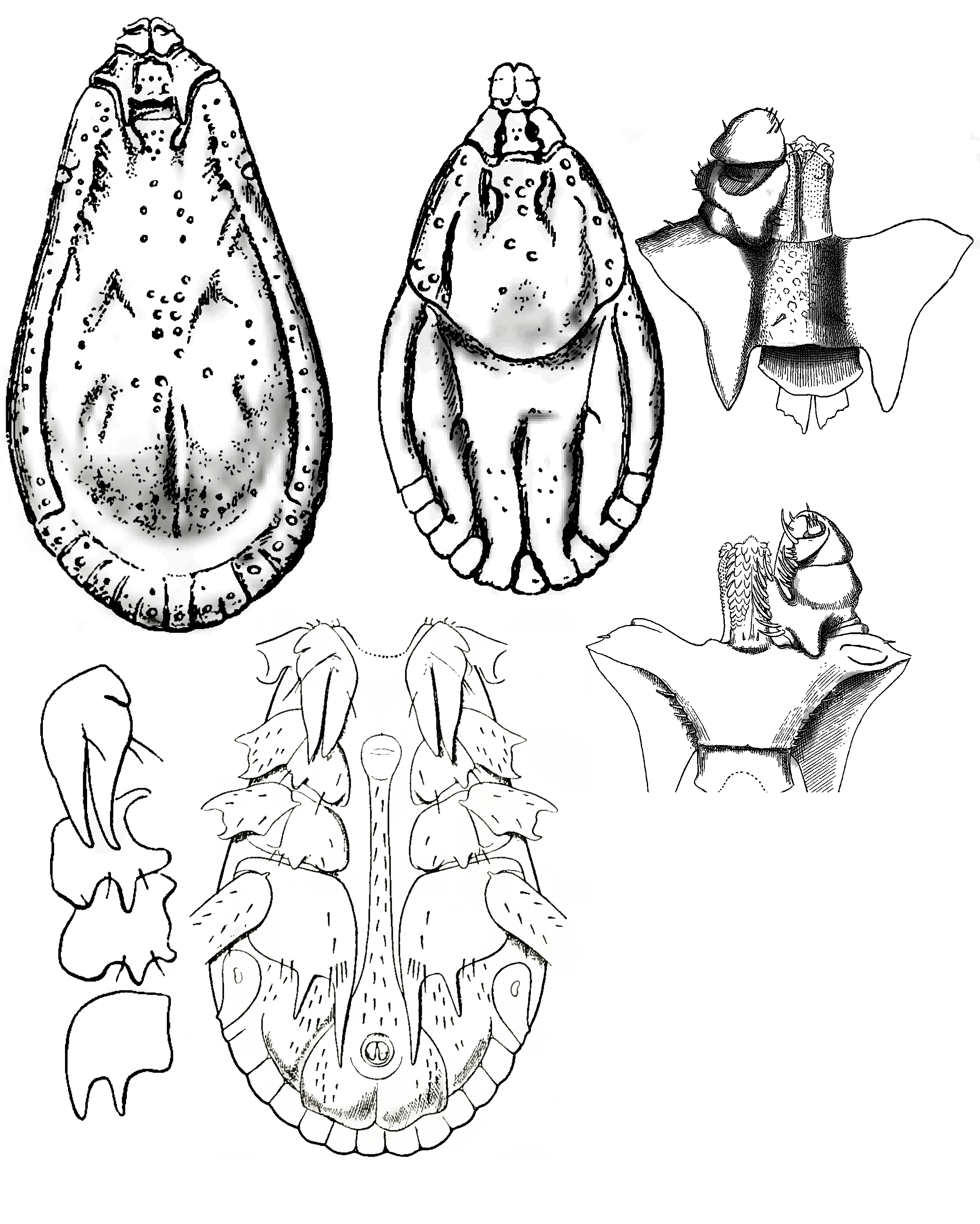
- Line-drawings of Rhipicentor bicornis

Scientific classification
- Kingdom: Animalia
- Phylum: Arthropoda
- Subphylum: Chelicerata
- Class: Arachnida
- Order: Ixodida
- Family: Ixodidae
- Genus: Rhipicentor
- Species: R. bicornis

Binomial name
- Rhipicentor bicornis Nuttall & Warburton, 1908^{host unknown, North Nyassa (Malawi)}

= Rhipicentor bicornis =

African tick species

Rhipicentor bicornis is a species of hard tick. Found throughout Southern and Central Africa, the species feeds mainly on domestic animals, especially dogs, but is also found on wild dogs, cats, and raccoons.

== Morphology ==
Rhipicentor are large ticks, especially when engorged. They are inornate, with a short hypostome and palps. They have eyes, and distinct festoons. Coxae I and IV have very long external and internal spurs, close in coxa I and separated in coxa IV. In males, coxa IV is greatly enlarged.

== Ecology and parasitism ==
Rhipicentor bicornis is present in Southern Africa - in Northern South Africa (Transvaal region), Namibia, Zambia and Zimbabwe, and widely in Central Africa. Domestic dogs and cattle are the primary adult hosts, but the species is also known from wild canids such as foxes and jackals, and wild felids such as cheetahs, leopards, lions and servals.

== Systematics and etymology ==
Rhipicentor bicornis is the type species of Rhipicentor. It is one of two species of Rhipicentor, the other being Rhipicentor nuttalli. The name "bicornis" means 'two-horned', and likely refers to the highly salient paired cornua (horns) on the female capitulum. It may also refer to the large paired coxal spurs on coxae I and IV.
