= Hyalomma brevipunctatum =

Scientific classification
- Kingdom: Animalia
- Phylum: Arthropoda
- Subphylum: Chelicerata
- Class: Arachnida
- Order: Ixodida
- Family: Ixodidae
- Genus: Hyalomma
- Species: H. brevipunctatum

Binomial name
- Hyalomma brevipunctatum Sharif, 1928

Synonyms
- Hyalomma hussaini brevipunctata Sharif, 1928; Hyalomma (Hyalommina) brevipunctata Kaiser & Hoogstraal, 1963

Species of tick

Hyalomma brevipunctatum, or Sharif's Indian hyalomma, is a hard-bodied tick of the family Ixodidae. It is found in India and Sri Lanka.

== Parasitism ==
It is an obligate ectoparasite of mammals such as cattle, goats, buffaloes, dogs, camels. Rare specimens were collected from humans, blue bull, sambar, and spotted deer. It is a potential vector of Kyasanur Forest disease virus.

== Description ==
Male has comma-shaped spiracular plates. Female has an elongate, oval operculum.
