= Africaniella transversale =

Scientific classification
- Kingdom: Animalia
- Phylum: Arthropoda
- Subphylum: Chelicerata
- Class: Arachnida
- Order: Ixodida
- Family: Ixodidae
- Genus: Africaniella; Travassos Dias, 1974
- Species: A. transversale

Binomial name
- Africaniella transversale (Lucas, 1845)

Synonyms
- Ixodes transversalis Lucas, 1845; Ixodes globulus Lucas, 1860; Aponomma transversale Neumann, 1899

Species of tick

Africaniella transversale is a species of tick. It is native to the tropical and subtropical grasslands, savannas and shrublands of Africa, where it feeds on boas and bovids. It is one of two species currently of the genus Africaniella.

== Systematics and morphology ==
Africaniella transversale is characterised by a suboval, very wide body profile; an indistinct anal groove; long, rounded triangular coxae; and in the male, broad triangular cornuae. The species is similar to Africaniella orlovi – there is some ambiguity as to whether the two species should be considered synonymous, due to the poor description of Kolonin, who initially described A. orlovi from Vietnam, where it is not present.

== Distribution ==
Some records suggest Africaniella transversale is present in the Palearctic realm, but the likelihood that it is established outside the Afrotropical realm is low. There is some evidence the species is able to infest non-Afrotropical hosts, however.
