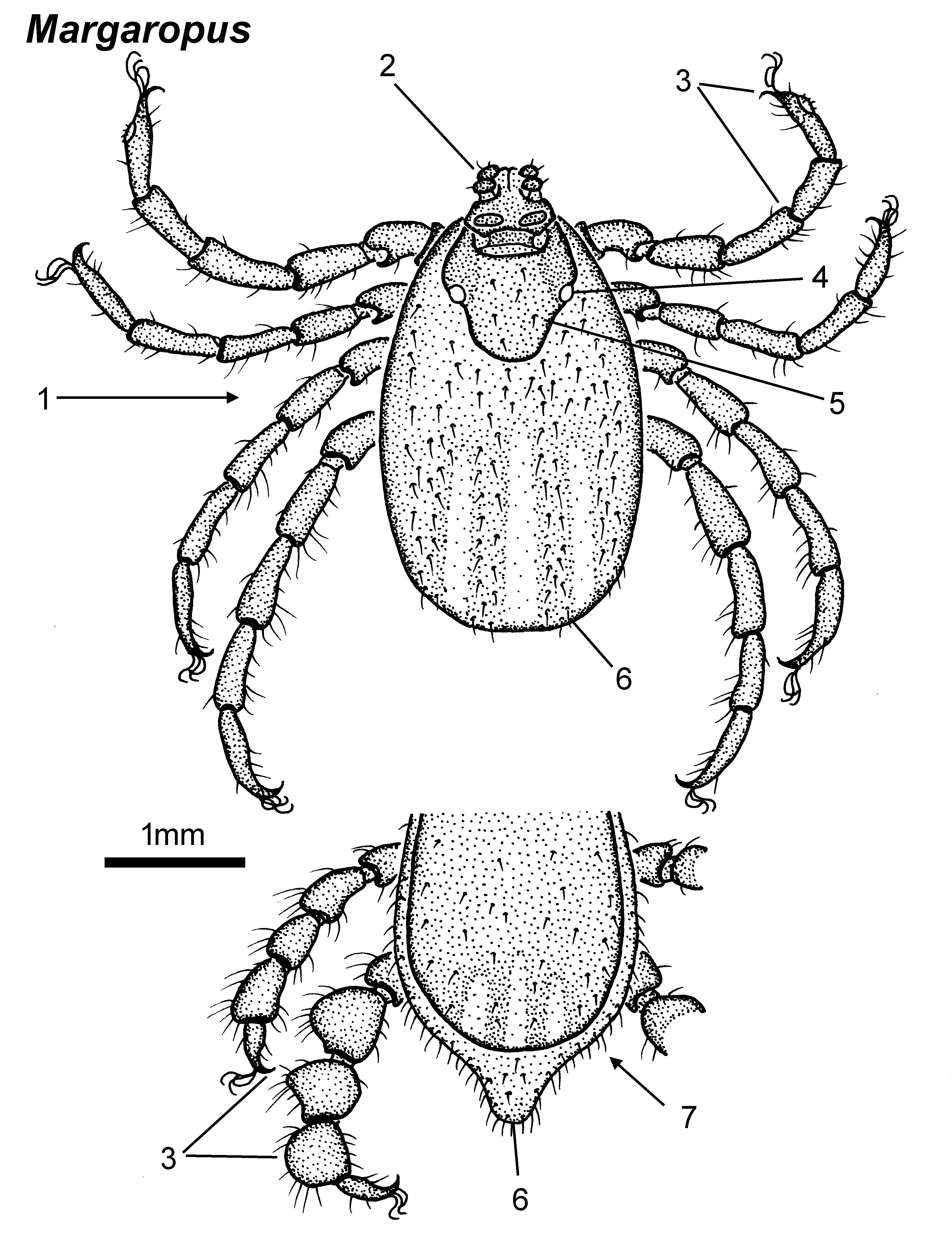
- Dorsal view of Margaropus female, with inset of male posterior below

Scientific classification
- Kingdom: Animalia
- Phylum: Arthropoda
- Subphylum: Chelicerata
- Class: Arachnida
- Order: Ixodida
- Family: Ixodidae
- Genus: Margaropus; Ferdinand Karsch, 1879

Type species
- Margaropus winthemi Karsch, 1879

= Margaropus =

Genus of ticks

Margaropus is a genus of ticks. Found in Africa, the genus is known best from Giraffidae.

Margaropus ticks are characterised as inornate, having eyes, lacking festoons, and with the legs of the male increasing in size from pair I to IV with the segments enlarged, giving them a beaded appearance, from which the genus name was taken, margaritopus signifying beady-legged.

In their native range, Margaropus species ticks parasitize larger land animals, including the three largest southern African wild ruminants, giraffes, Giraffa camelopardalis; African buffaloes, Syncerus caffer; and common eland, Taurotragus oryx.

Although the genus is no longer considered a sister taxa to Boophilus, it may be a subgenus of, or the sister taxa to, Rhipicephalus.

== Species ==
The genus currently includes three species:

- Margaropus reidi Hoogstraal 1956 - the Sudanese beady-legged tick
- Margaropus wileyi Walker & Laurence 1973 - the East African giraffe tick
- Margaropus winthemi Karsch 1879 - the South African winter horse tick or beady-legged tick (Note: The species name memorialises naturalist and entomologist Wilhelm von Winthem.)

== See also ==
- Photos of Margaropus winthemi
