= Ixodes hoogstraali =

Scientific classification
- Domain: Eukaryota
- Kingdom: Animalia
- Phylum: Arthropoda
- Subphylum: Chelicerata
- Class: Arachnida
- Order: Ixodida
- Family: Ixodidae
- Genus: Ixodes
- Species: I. hoogstraali

Binomial name
- Ixodes hoogstraali Arthur, 1955

Species of tick

Ixodes hoogstraali is a species of tick endemic to the higher mountains of southwestern Arabia. The type specimens were collected at 7,400 feet (2,300 m) elevation near Ma'bar, Yemen, on king jirds (Meriones rex buryi Thomas), trapped beside a well in dry fields on a rocky plateau. The species was named in honor of Harry Hoogstraal, who provided the type specimens; the species is closely related to Ixodes ugandanus Neumann, 1906.
