= Ixodes arboricola =

Scientific classification
- Domain: Eukaryota
- Kingdom: Animalia
- Phylum: Arthropoda
- Subphylum: Chelicerata
- Class: Arachnida
- Order: Ixodida
- Family: Ixodidae
- Genus: Ixodes
- Species: I. arboricola

Binomial name
- Ixodes arboricola Schulze & Schlottke, 1930

Synonyms
- Pholeoixodes arboricola Ixodes lagodechiensis Eschatocephalus dryadis Ixodes passericola Ixodes dryadis Ixodes strigicola

Species of tick

Ixodes arboricola, also called the tree-hole tick, is a species of tick that parasitises small passerine birds. It is among the most common species on the house sparrow.
