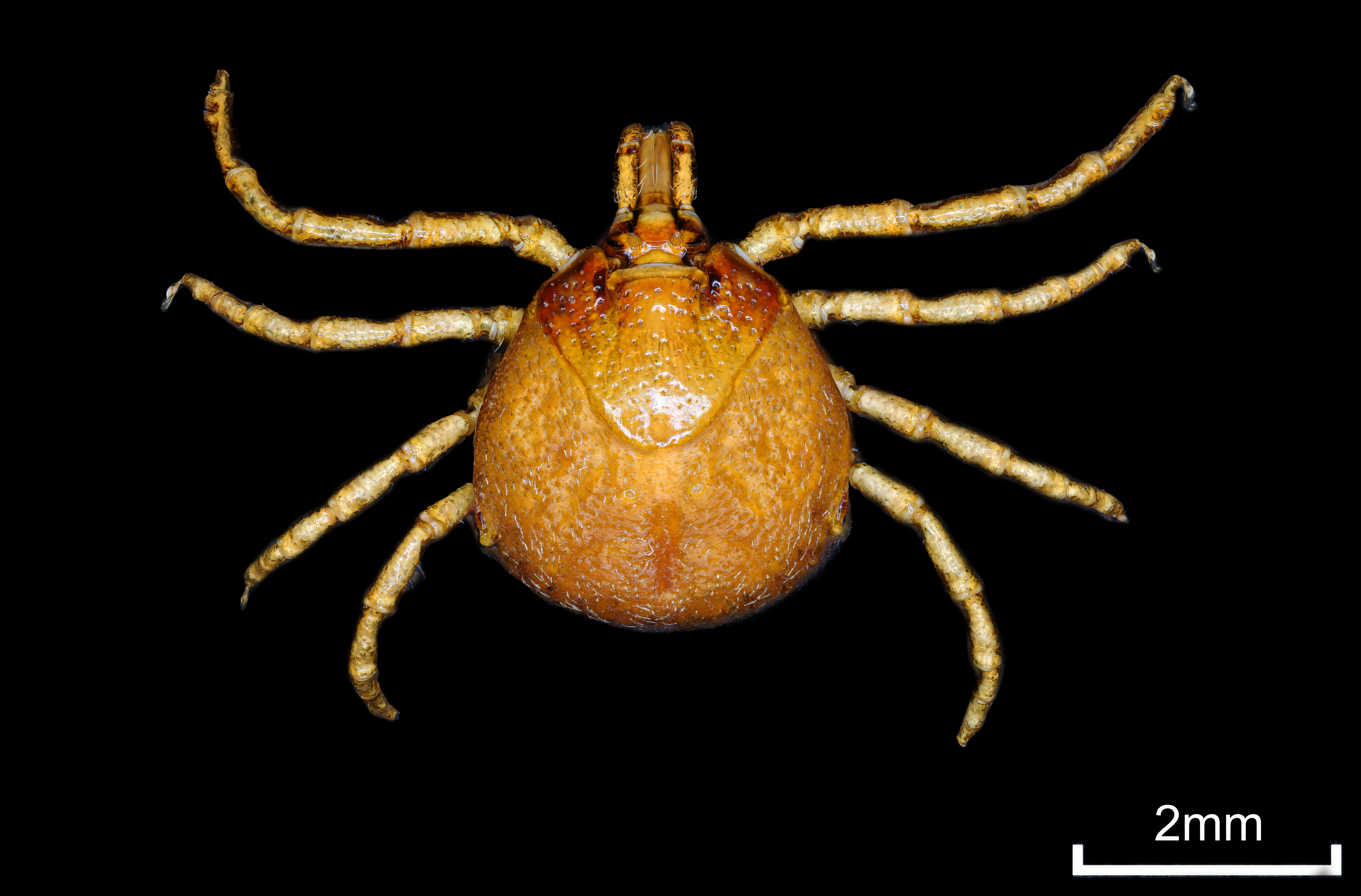
- Female Cryptocroton papuanum

Scientific classification
- Kingdom: Animalia
- Phylum: Arthropoda
- Subphylum: Chelicerata
- Class: Arachnida
- Order: Ixodida
- Family: Ixodidae
- Genus: Cryptocroton; Barker & Barker, 2024
- Species: C. papuanum

Binomial name
- Cryptocroton papuanum (Hirst, 1914)

Synonyms
- Amblyomma papuana Hirst, 1914; Amblyomma papuanum Hirst, 1914 (after Roberts, 1964)

= Cryptocroton =

Species of tick

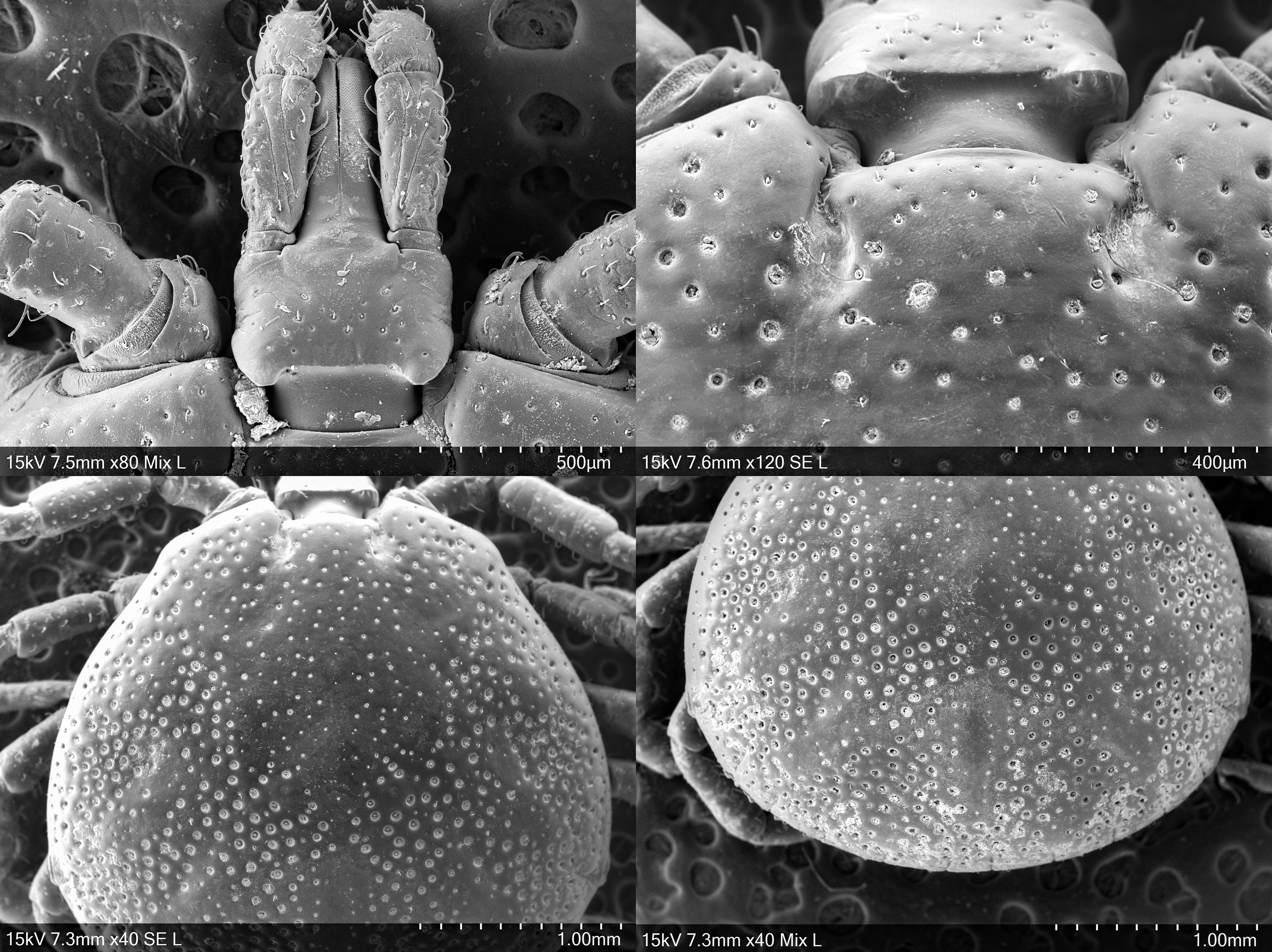
Micrographs of a male Cryptocroton papuanum

Cryptocroton papuanum is a species of tick native to New Guinea, and Northern Queensland. Specimens have been found on ground-feeding birds, such as cassowaries and crowned pigeons, as well as on short-beaked echidnas. It is the only member of the monotypic genus Cryptocroton.

== Morphology and systematics ==
As its name suggests, the genus is cryptic, as the genus cannot be distinguished, morphologically, from Amblyomma. Phylogenies inferred from mitochondrial genomes and rRNA have confirmed that the genus has at least 25% pairwise genetic difference from other genera.

Cryptocroton papuanum has a rounded body profile, similar to other former Aponomma, and is identifiable by its two small, widely separated coxal spurs and midline trochanter spurs. Despite having eyes, the species may be confused for Bothriocroton concolor, an eyeless tick of echidnas present in North Queensland, which shares a similar rounded body profile and punctate male conscutum. Indeed, Cryptocroton papuanum arises from the Haematobothrion lineage, which includes the genera Bothriocroton, Alloceraea, and Haemaphysalis, among others.

- Ixodidae
  - - Prostriata
      Ixodes
  - Metastriata
    - Robertsicus
    - - Amblyocephalus
        - Amblyomma
        - - Dermacentor
          - - Rhipicentor
            - - Hyalomma
              - Rhipicephalus
      - Haematobothrion
        - - Cryptocroton
          - Bothriocroton
        - - Archaeocroton
          - Alloceraea
        - Haemaphysalis

Ixodidae cladogram after Barker et al., (2024)
