= Sharifiella =

Scientific classification
- Kingdom: Animalia
- Phylum: Arthropoda
- Subphylum: Chelicerata
- Class: Arachnida
- Order: Ixodida
- Family: Ixodidae
- Genus: Sharifiella; Santos Dias, 1958
- Species: S. theilerae

Binomial name
- Sharifiella theilerae (Hoogstraal, 1953)

Synonyms
- Haemaphysalis theilerae Hoogstraal, 1953

Genus of tick

Sharifiella is a monotypic genus of tick. Its only species is Sharifiella theilerae. The species is known only from tenrecs on Madagascar.

== Description ==
Sharifiella theilerae is found across Madagascar. Almost all specimens, both adults and instars, were found on tailless tenrecs, with only one sample being from a greater hedgehog tenrec. Like Haemaphysalis, the species is eyeless, but has elongated palpi with only slight lateral salience at its mid-length. The basis capitulum is subtriangular with blunt lateral apices, and coxa I has both internal and external spurs.

== Taxonomy and systematics ==
Sharifiella was formerly a subgenus of Haemaphysalis. Through phylogenies inferred from entire mitochondrial genomes and nuclear 28S rRNA, the genus was shown to be not only distinct from other Haemaphysalis, but actually basal to the Rhipicephaline lineage, not the Haemaphysaline lineage. The genus was elevated to full generic rank in 2025.
