= Hyalomma truncatum =

Scientific classification
- Kingdom: Animalia
- Phylum: Arthropoda
- Subphylum: Chelicerata
- Class: Arachnida
- Order: Ixodida
- Family: Ixodidae
- Genus: Hyalomma
- Species: H. truncatum

Binomial name
- Hyalomma truncatum Koch, 1844

Species of tick

Hyalomma truncatum, also known as the shiny hyalomma or small smooth bont-legged tick, is a species of hard tick in the family Ixodidae. It is found in Africa.
