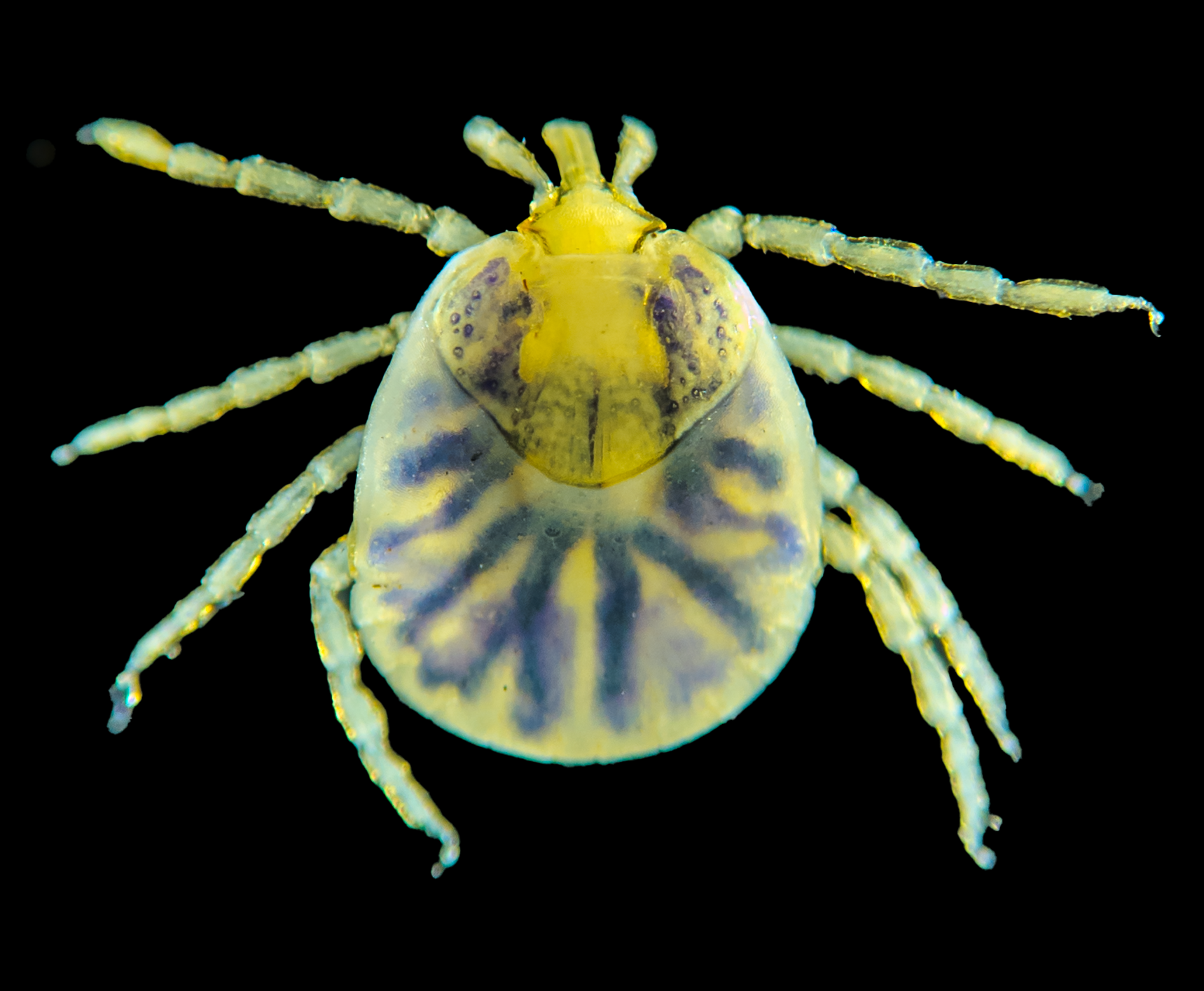
- Female Archaeocroton sphenodonti

Conservation status
- Relict (NZ TCS)

Scientific classification
- Kingdom: Animalia
- Phylum: Arthropoda
- Subphylum: Chelicerata
- Class: Arachnida
- Order: Ixodida
- Family: Ixodidae
- Genus: Archaeocroton; Dumbleton, 1943
- Species: A. sphenodonti

Binomial name
- Archaeocroton sphenodonti (Dumbleton, 1943)

Synonyms
- Aponomma sphenodonti Dumbleton, 1943; Amblyomma sphenodonti (Dumbleton, 1943)

= Archaeocroton =

Tuatara tick

Species of tick

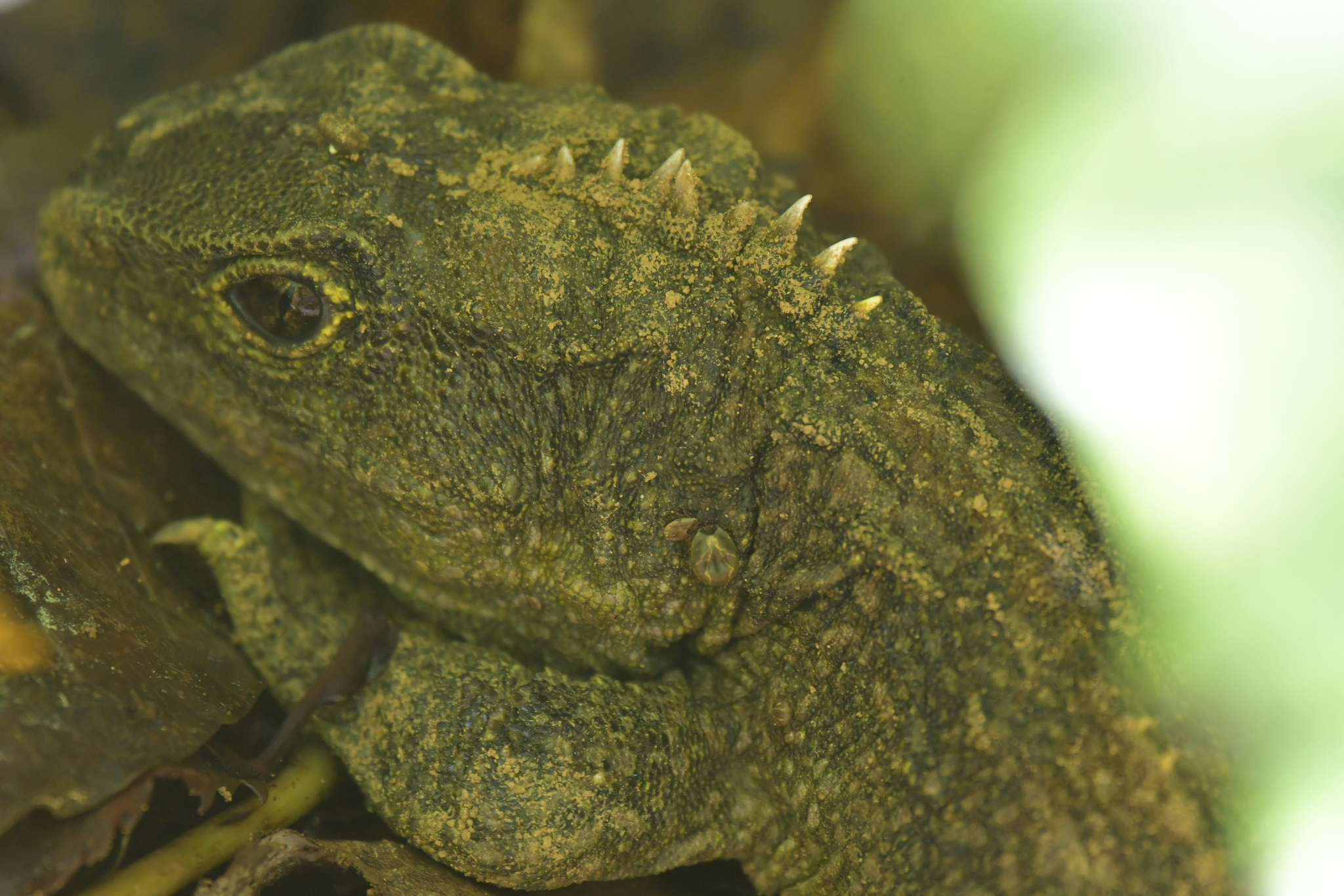
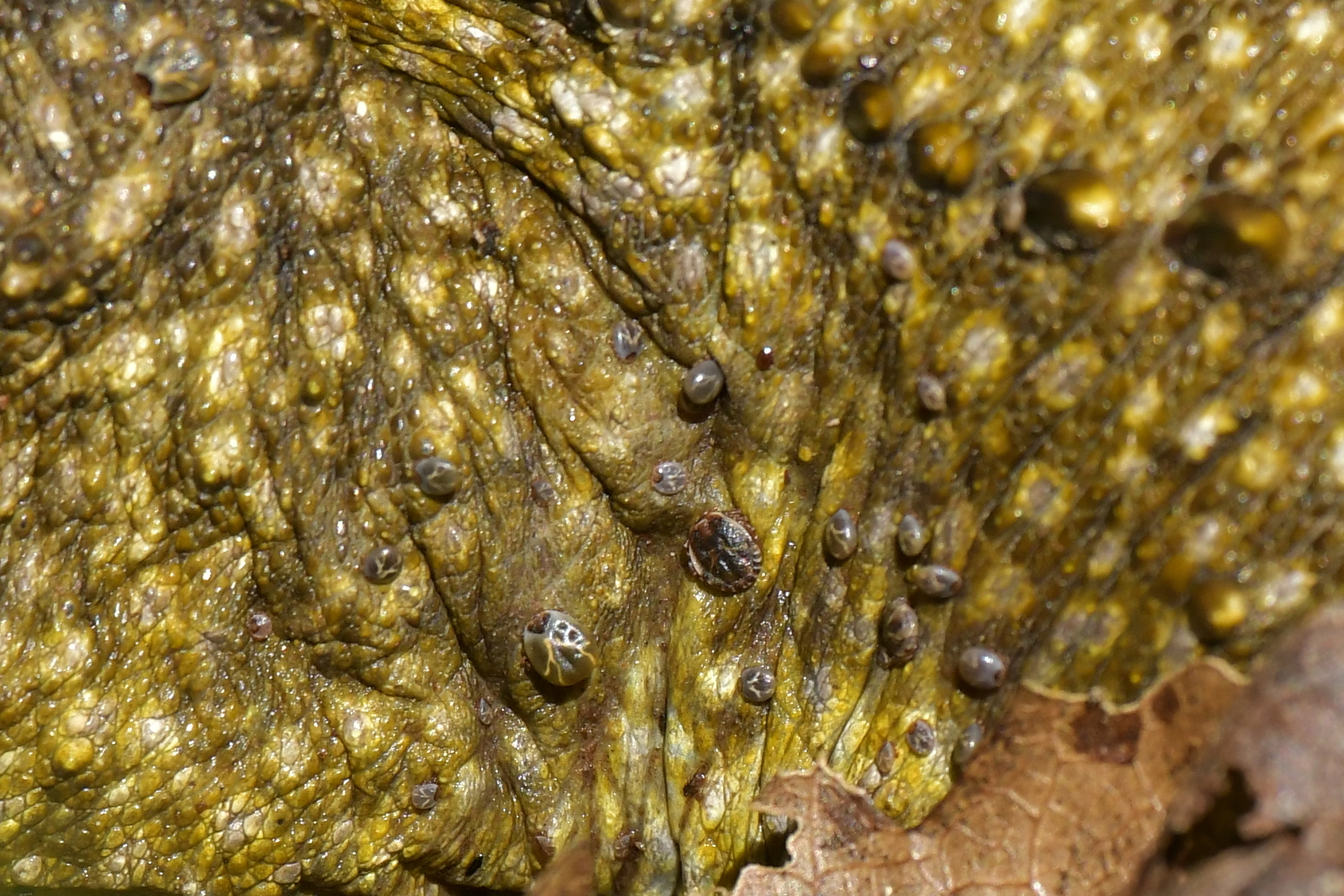
Tuatara ticks on the body of their host, Sphenodon punctatus

Archaeocroton sphenodonti, or the tuatara tick, is a species of tick that parasitises only the tuatara of New Zealand. It is found on just four of the twelve island groups where tuatara survive, preferring islands where the reptiles live in high densities. Larvae, nymphs, and adults all feed exclusively on tuatara blood, and ticks can survive for up to a year without a host. When tuatara are translocated, the tick has been lost or survives only in low densities in the new population. It is the only living species in the genus Archaeocroton.

== Description ==
Adult tuatara ticks are nearly circular, light brown and 2 millimetres (0.079 in) long. They were first described by Lionel Jack Dumbleton in 1943. The holotype male specimen was collected from Stephens Island by E. J. Tillyard in January 1922 and later deposited in the New Zealand Arthropod Collection.

== Taxonomy ==
Originally, this species was placed in the genus Aponomma, as members of this genus mostly parasitise reptiles. More 'typical' Aponomma were placed into the genus Amblyomma in 2002. Phylogenetic analyses suggested that this tick was not closely related to other ticks in the genus Amblyomma, being more closely related to genus Bothriocroton and it should to be placed in its own genus, Archaeocroton.

A fossil species of the genus, Archaeocroton kaufmani was described in 2023 from Burmese amber from Myanmar, dating to the mid-Cretaceous, around 100 million years ago. The host of this species is unknown.

- Ixodidae
  - - Prostriata
      Ixodes
  - Metastriata
    - Robertsicus
    - - Amblyocephalus
        - Amblyomma
        - - Dermacentor
          - - Rhipicentor
            - - Hyalomma
              - Rhipicephalus
      - Haematobothrion
        - - Cryptocroton
          - Bothriocroton
        - - Archaeocroton
          - Alloceraea
        - Haemaphysalis

Ixodidae cladogram after Barker et al., (2024)

== Distribution ==
Like its host, this species has populations living on islands off the coast of the North Island and South Island of New Zealand. However, its distribution is confined to only four of the twelve island groups: the Mercury and Aldermen Islands off the coast of the North Island, and Stephens Island and the Trios in Cook Strait. Islands with a high density of tuatara, with increased association between hosts, are more likely to have ticks present, as the parasite has limited mobility and would find it difficult to disperse where tuatara densities are lower or fluctuate.

== Life cycle ==
The tick has a three-stage life cycle, with all stages parasitising the tuatara. Females that have fed on the host's blood detach from the tuatara and lay eggs. This occurs in the tuatara's burrow. When the eggs hatch, the larvae attach to a tuatara, feed and detach. After moulting, the resulting nymph also attaches and repeats the cycle of feeding, detaching and moulting to become an adult tick. This life cycle may take 2–3 years. Increased temperatures may cause an increase in copulation on adult ticks and faster development rates of all life cycle stages.

== Ecology ==
Tuatara are reptiles that use burrows for shelter. Their ticks can spend over one year off their host and prefer the moist and dark habitats provided by these burrows. Their preference for humid and dark conditions may be an adaptive feature for remaining inside or finding burrows where the host resides. If copulation takes place off the host, ticks may use pheromones to locate a mate. Tuatara live in a variety of habitats and are parasitised by ticks in all of them. The density of ticks on tuatara are higher when the host lives in pasture than in canopy forest. Tuatara ticks mirror the nocturnal activity of tuatara. They are more mobile at night, which could increase the chance of unattached ticks finding a host. It could also reduce the likelihood of desiccation due to the increased humidity at night. They prefer attaching in positions on the back of the host, folds in the skin of the rear legs and the side of the body. Once attached, they feed on the host's blood. Unfed adult ticks have been observed to survive for over one year without their host.

== Conservation ==
This species is less widespread than its host. When translocation of tuatara has occurred, tick densities are lower or absent in the new population. Some tuatara have had the parasite removed before translocation and other populations of tuatara have lost the parasite afterwards. Its conservation status is relict, as – like its host – it once occupied a wider distribution.
