= Nosomma =

Scientific classification
- Kingdom: Animalia
- Phylum: Arthropoda
- Subphylum: Chelicerata
- Class: Arachnida
- Order: Ixodida
- Family: Ixodidae
- Genus: Nosomma; Schulze, 1919
- Species: N. monstrosum

Binomial name
- Nosomma monstrosum (Nuttall & Warburton, 1908)

Synonyms
- Hyalomma monstrosum

Monotypic tick genus

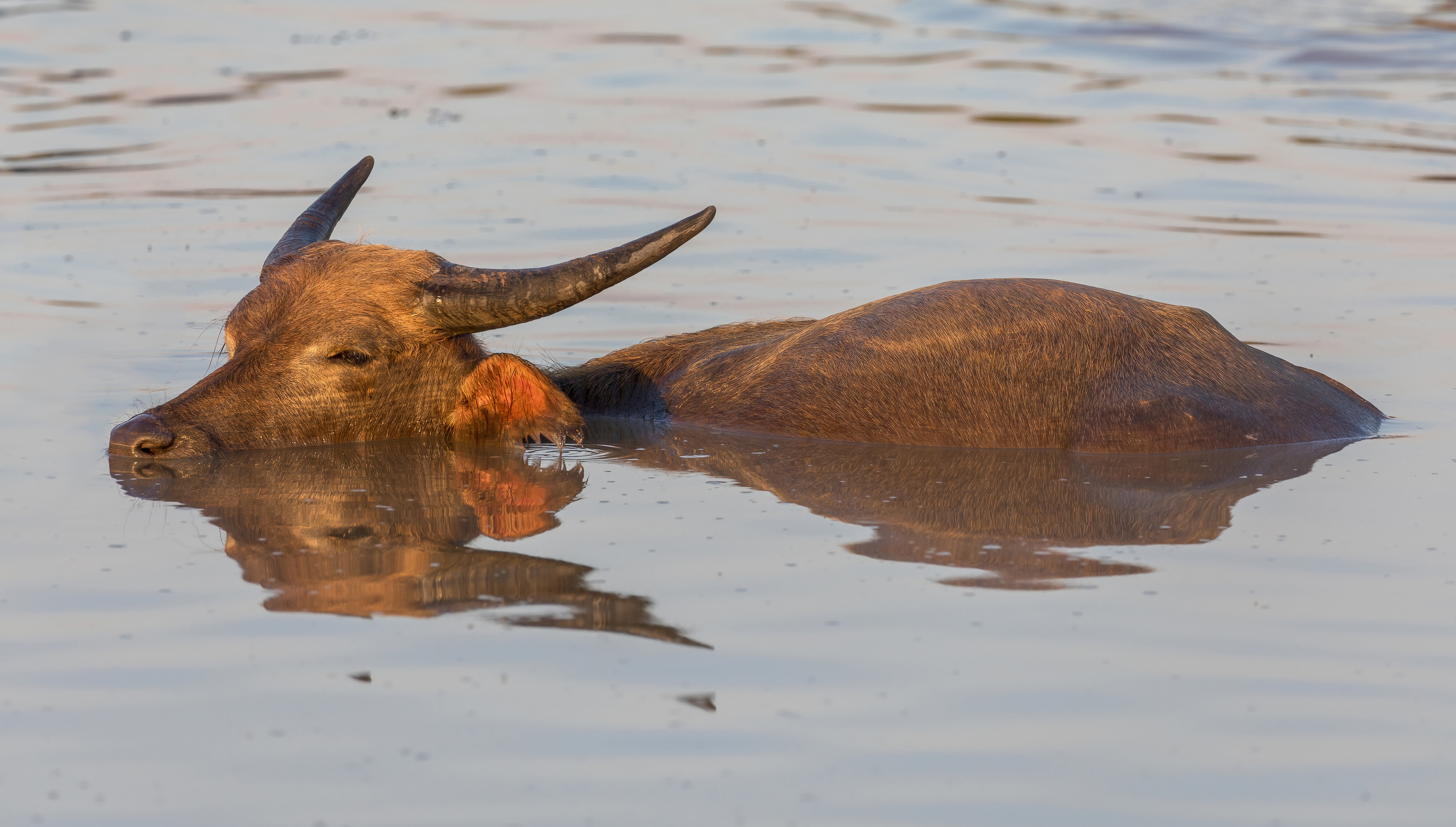
Nosomma monstrosum is known best from the Asian water buffalo.

Nosomma monstrosum is a species of hard-bodied tick found in Asia. The species is found primarily on water buffalo. It is the only member of the monotypic genus Nosomma.

== Ecology and parasitism ==
Nosomma monstrosum is an obligate ectoparasite of mammals, particularly Asian water buffaloes. Adults are also known from cattle, pigs, dogs, bears and horses. Instars - larvae and nymphs - are mostly known to parasitise rodents and shrews. The species is distributed across south and south-eastern Asia, being found in Thailand, India, Nepal, Sri Lanka, Laos, Bangladesh, Vietnam, Pakistan, Myanmar and Tibet.

Nosomma monstrosum is a likely three-host tick, although adverse environmental conditions may alter this behaviour. While the species is found in the Kyasanur Forest disease endemic area, it is not known to be a vector. Nosomma ticks are very rare parasites of humans, and no pathogenesis has been described.

== Taxonomy ==
Nosomma was first described by Schulze as a monotypic genus for the species Hyalomma monstrosum. The genus is closely related to Dermacentor and Hyalomma. Prakasan & Ramami described a new species, Nosomma keralensis, in 2007, but the species has been subsequently rejected due to its poor description and unsuitable differentiating characters.
