= Anomalohimalaya =

Scientific classification
- Kingdom: Animalia
- Phylum: Arthropoda
- Subphylum: Chelicerata
- Class: Arachnida
- Order: Ixodida
- Family: Ixodidae
- Genus: Anomalohimalaya; Hoogstraal, Kaiser & Mitchell, 1970

Type species
- Anomalohimalaya lamai Hoogstraal, Kaiser and Mitchell, 1970

Genus of ticks

Anomalohimalaya is a genus of hard ticks in the family Ixodidae. It contains three known species.

== Species ==
The following species are recognised in the genus Anomalohimalaya:

- Anomalohimalaya cricetuli Teng and Huang, 1981
- Anomalohimalaya lamai Hoogstraal, Kaiser and Mitchell, 1970
- Anomalohimalaya lotozkyi Filippova and Panova, 1978
