= Africaniella =

Scientific classification
- Kingdom: Animalia
- Phylum: Arthropoda
- Subphylum: Chelicerata
- Class: Arachnida
- Order: Ixodida
- Family: Ixodidae
- Genus: Africaniella; Travassos Dias, 1974

Type species
- Africaniella transversale (Lucas, 1845)

Genus of ticks

Africaniella is a genus of hard ticks. There are two extant member species, native to tropical and subtropical Africa. Africaniella species primarily parasitise boa snakes.

== Species ==
As of 2026, there are 2 species described as Africaniella:

- Africaniella orlovi (Kolonin, 1992)
- Africaniella transversale (Lucas, 1845)
