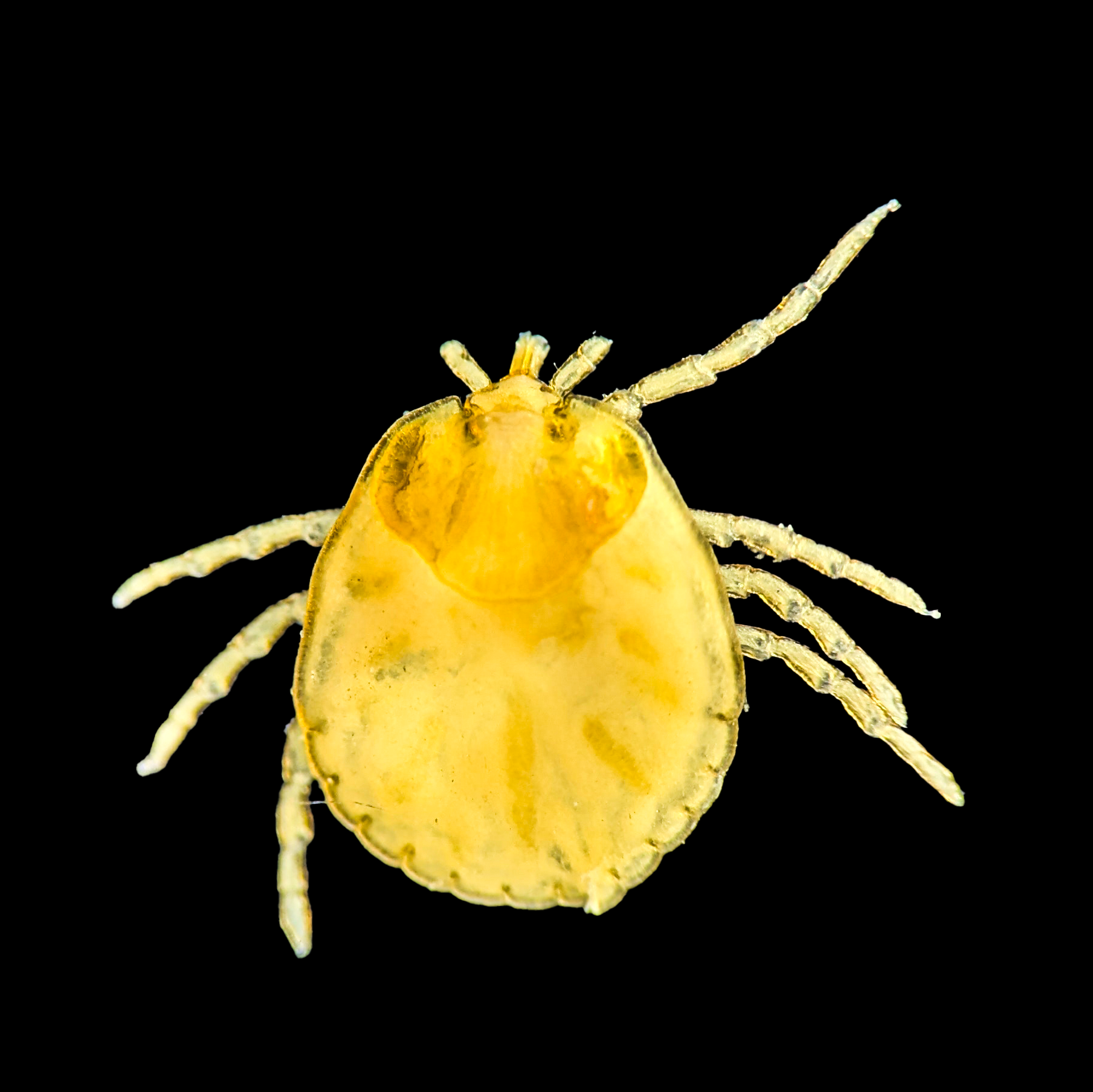
- Female Robertsicus elaphensis.

Scientific classification
- Kingdom: Animalia
- Phylum: Arthropoda
- Subphylum: Chelicerata
- Class: Arachnida
- Order: Ixodida
- Family: Ixodidae
- Genus: Robertsicus; Barker & Burger, 2018
- Species: R. elaphensis

Binomial name
- Robertsicus elaphensis (Price, 1958)

Synonyms
- Aponomma elaphense Price, 1958

= Robertsicus =

Species of tick

Robertsicus elaphensis, or the tail-eating tick, is a species of tick. It is native to the Chihuahuan Desert of Mexico and southeastern United States including parts of Arizona, Texas and New Mexico, corresponding to the habitat of its sole host, the Trans-Pecos rat-snake (Bogertophis subocularis). It is the only reptile tick native to the United States, and is the only member of the Robertsicus genus.

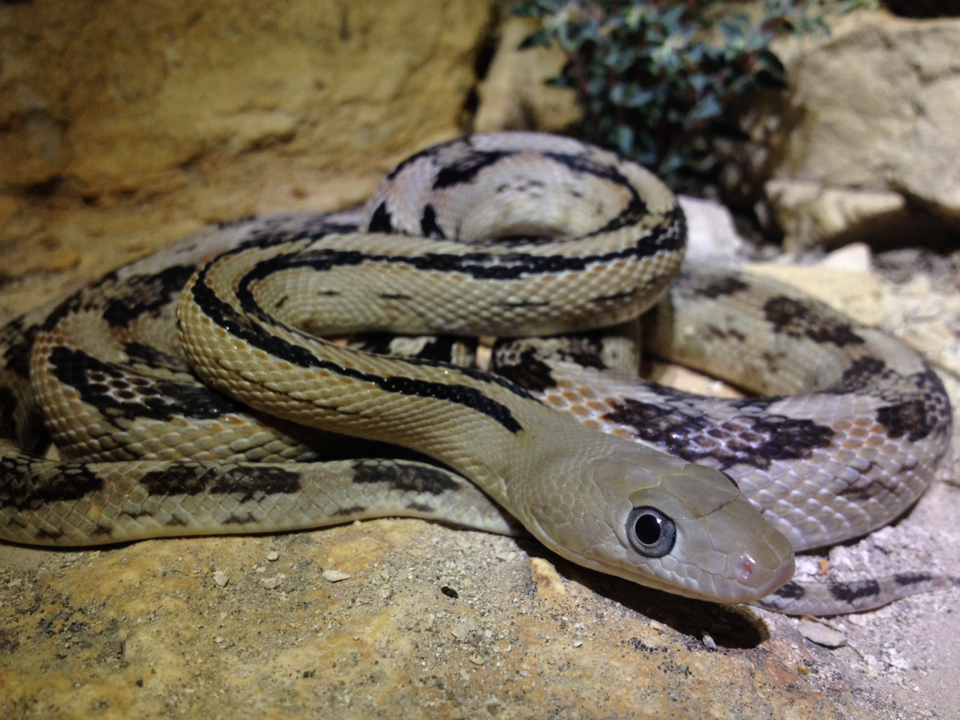
Robertsicus elaphensis is known only from the Trans-Pecos rat snake.

== Systematics ==
Robertsicus elaphensis was originally designated as an Aponomma. Kaufman, in their review of the genus, grouped the species as a 'primitive' Aponomma, along with what was then Aponomma sphenodonti, a tuatara tick from New Zealand. The analysis of Burger confirmed this distinction from the other members of Aponomma, showing the two species were not suitable for inclusion in Amblyomma, or Bothriocroton, the successors of Aponomma. Barker & Burger established the Archaeocroton and Robertsicus genera to accommodate the species in 2018. Robertsicus remains a monotypic genus.

- Ixodidae
  - - Prostriata
      Ixodes
  - Metastriata
    - Robertsicus
    - - Amblyocephalus
        - Amblyomma
        - - Dermacentor
          - - Rhipicentor
            - - Hyalomma
              - Rhipicephalus
      - Haematobothrion
        - - Cryptocroton
          - Bothriocroton
        - - Archaeocroton
          - Alloceraea
        - Haemaphysalis

Ixodidae cladogram after Barker et al., (2024)

== Ecology ==
Like many other reptile ticks, R. elaphensis completes its life stages in the burrow of the snake, moulting and laying eggs in the refuge.

== Morphology ==
Robertsicus elaphensis is most similar to Archaeocroton sphenodonti, both being inornate ticks with single coxa I spurs, with subtriangular basis capituli and strongly rounded cornua in the females. Price also considered the species comparable to Bothriocroton auruginans, due to the similar body profile, pale colouring and shared dental formula.

== Etymology ==
The genus is named for Frederick Hugh Sherston Roberts, known as the 'Father of Australian tick biology'. The species name is after the former name for its host genus, Elaphe.
