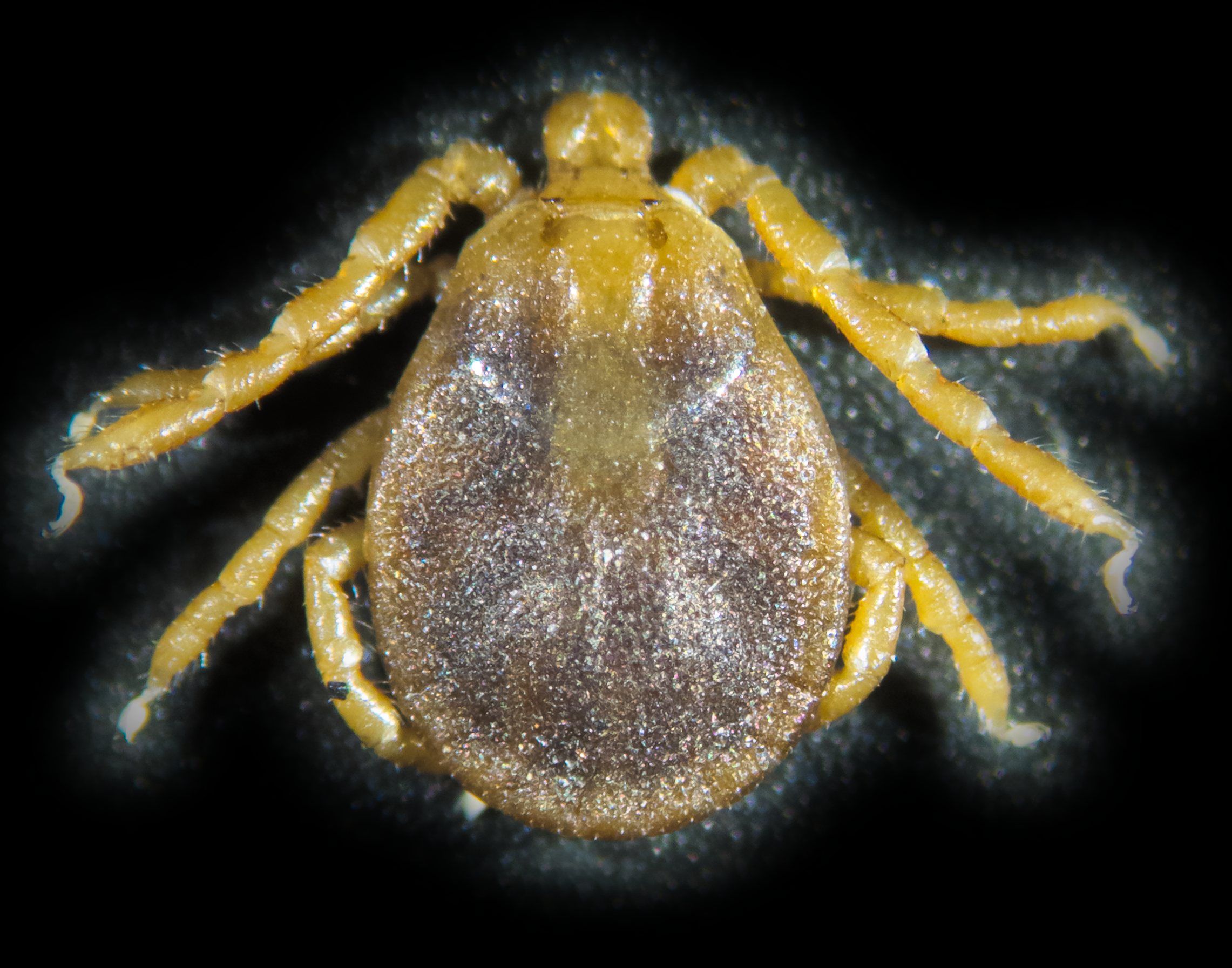
- Alloceraea inermis

Scientific classification
- Kingdom: Animalia
- Phylum: Arthropoda
- Subphylum: Chelicerata
- Class: Arachnida
- Order: Ixodida
- Family: Ixodidae
- Genus: Alloceraea; Schulze, 1919

Type species
- Alloceraea inermis (Birula, 1895)

= Alloceraea =

Genus of ticks

Alloceraea is a genus of hard ticks. Member species parasitise a wide variety of hosts, but particularly bovids, cervids and birds. The genus is found in the Oriental and Nearctic zoogeographic regions, in tropical and subtropical dry broadleaf and conifer forests. Formerly a subgenus of Haemaphysalis, the taxon was elevated to generic rank in 2024.

- Ixodidae
  - - Prostriata
      Ixodes
  - Metastriata
    - Robertsicus
    - - Amblyocephalus
        - Amblyomma
        - - Dermacentor
          - - Rhipicentor
            - - Hyalomma
              - Rhipicephalus
      - Haematobothrion
        - - Cryptocroton
          - Bothriocroton
        - - Archaeocroton
          - Alloceraea
        - Haemaphysalis

Ixodidae cladogram after Barker et al., (2024)

== Species ==
- Alloceraea aponommoides (Warburton, 1913)
- Alloceraea colasbelcouri (Santos Dias, 1958)
- Alloceraea inermis (Birula, 1895)
- Alloceraea kitaokai (Hoogstraal, 1969)
- Alloceraea kolonini (Du, Sun, Xu and Shao, 2018)
- Alloceraea primitiva (Teng, 1982)
- †Alloceraea cretacea (Note: While this fossilied specimen was characterised as a Haemaphysalis (Alloceraea), and is thusly included in Alloceraea, Kelava et al. (2024) make clear that the poor quality of the specimen prevents confident morphological association with Alloceraea, or even Haemaphysalis.) (Chitimia-Dobler, Pfeffer & Dunlop, 2018) Burmese amber, Myanmar, Cenomanian ~99 million years ago.
