= Paul Schulze (zoologist) =

German Tick Taxonomist

- Born: 20 November 1887; Berlin, Germany
- Died: 13 May 1949 (aged 61); Rostock, Germany
- Education: University of Berlin
- Scientific career
- Workplaces: University of Rostock

Paul Schulze was "the most important German tick taxonomist of the early 20th century." Between 1929 and 1937, he described 19 genera, 17 subgenera, 150 species and 150 subspecies of ixodid ticks. He was essentially an amateur taxonomist, working alone for most of his career, not consulting the major tick collections or collaborating with other tick taxonomists.

== Life and career ==
Born Leopold Ernst Paul Schulze on November 20, 1887, in Berlin, he graduated from high school in 1907 and studied science in Berlin, where in 1910 he became an assistant at the Zoological Institute of the University of Berlin. In 1911 he was awarded the Doctor of Philosophy degree in Zoology from the University of Berlin. The title of his dissertation was Die Nackengabel der Papilionidenraupen (The Osmeterium of the Papilionidae).

During World War I, Schulze served as a soldier in a support role, behind the front lines, due to a heart problem. After this compulsory service, he completed post-doctoral work at the University of Berlin in 1918.

In 1923, Schulze was appointed a full professor at the University of Rostock, serving from 1923 to 1945 as Professor of Zoology and Comparative Anatomy, Dean of the Faculty of Arts from 1931 to 1932, and as a Rector from December 1932 to March 1936. His professional contributions included serving as co-director of the university entomology seminar, co-editorship of Zeitschrift für Morphologie und Ökologie der Tiere (Journal of Morphology and Ecology of Animals), and serving as Secretary of the Verein der Freunde der Naturgeschichte in Mecklenburg (Association of Friends of Natural History in Mecklenburg).

In 1945, Schulze was dismissed from university service as a consequence of his membership in the National Socialist German Workers Party, which he had joined in 1937.

Schulze died on May 13, 1949, in Rostock.

== Legacy ==
Although many of the scientific names bestowed by Schulze have been synonymized, they remain important as molecular and morphological studies result in the reinstatement of other names that were once considered synonyms.

Contemporary tick specialists praise Schulze's "perception of the complexity of the genus Dermacentor (under Indocentor) in the Oriental and Australasian zoogeographic regions, and his understanding of tick biodiversity in these regions" which "constitute seminal scientific achievements."

== Ticks named by Schulze ==
- Amblyomma babirussae Schulze, 1933
- Amblyomma quadricavum Schulze, 1941
- Dermacentor confragus Schulze, 1933
- Dermacentor sinicus Schulze, 1932
- Dermacentor steini Schulze, 1933
- Haemaphysalis bartelsi Schulze, 1938
- Haemaphysalis heinrichi Schulze, 1939
- Haemaphysalis hylobatis Schulze, 1933
- Haemaphysalis renschi Schulze, 1933
- Hyalomma albiparmatum Schulze, 1919
- Hyalomma impeltatum Schulze & Schlottke, 1930
- Hyalomma nitidum Schulze, 1919
- Hyalomma scupense Schulze, 1919
- Ixodes apronophorus Schulze, 1924
- Ixodes arboricola Schulze & Schlottke, 1930
- Ixodes collocaliae Schulze, 1937
- Ixodes cumulatimpunctatus Schulze, 1943
- Ixodes luxuriosus Schulze, 1932
- Ixodes nuttallianus Schulze, 1930
- Ixodes persulcatus Schulze, 1930
- Ixodes priscicollaris Schulze, 1932
- Ixodes rugicollis Schulze & Schlottke, 1930
- Ixodes steini Schulze, 1932
- Ixodes vanidicus Schulze, 1943
- Rhipicephalus pilans Schulze, 1935
- Rhipicephalus pumilio Schulze, 1935

== Ticks named in honor of Schulze ==
- Hyalomma schulzei Olenev, 1931
- Ixodes schulzei Aragão & Fonseca, 1951
- Rhipicephalus schulzei Olenev, 1929
