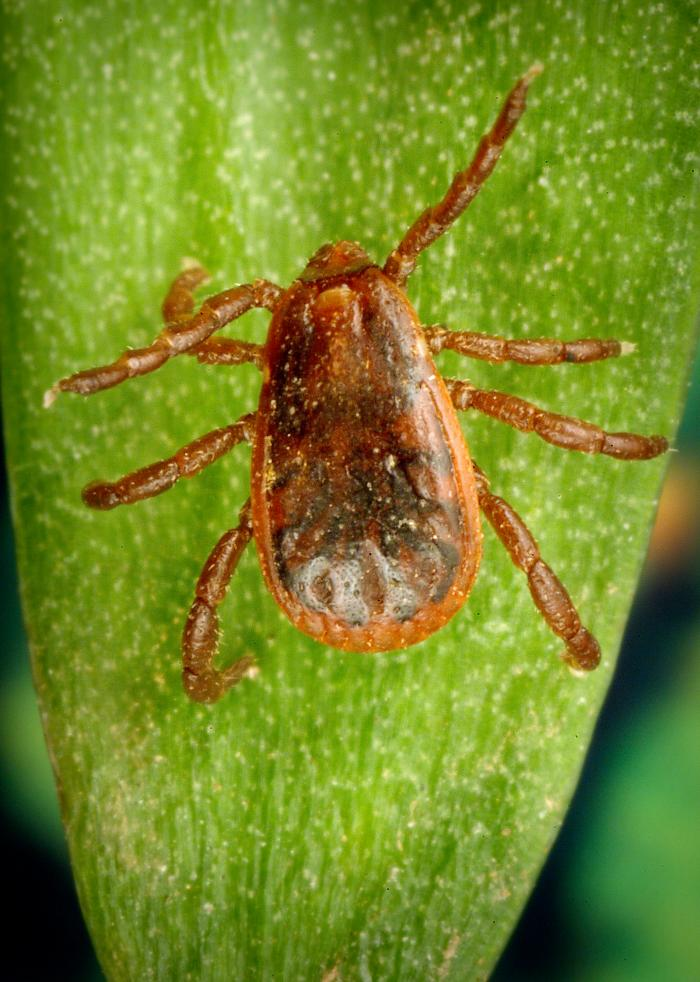
- Rhipicephalus sanguineus

Scientific classification
- Kingdom: Animalia
- Phylum: Arthropoda
- Subphylum: Chelicerata
- Class: Arachnida
- Order: Ixodida
- Family: Ixodidae
- Genus: Rhipicephalus; Koch, 1844

Type species
- Ixodes sanguineus Latreille, 1806

Species
- 90 species, see text.

= Rhipicephalus =

Genus of ticks

- Ixodidae
  - - Prostriata
      Ixodes
  - Metastriata
    - Robertsicus
    - - Amblyocephalus
        - Amblyomma
        - - Dermacentor
          - - Rhipicentor
            - - Hyalomma
              - Rhipicephalus
      - Haematobothrion
        - - Cryptocroton
          - Bothriocroton
        - - Archaeocroton
          - Alloceraea
        - Haemaphysalis

Ixodidae cladogram after Barker et al., (2024)

Rhipicephalus is a genus of hard ticks in the family Ixodidae, consisting of about 90 species. While many species are native to tropical Africa, the genus is cosmopolitan, being found across the world. Several species are vectors of significant human and animal pathogens.

== Morphology ==
Rhipicephalus ticks are commonly called 'brown ticks' as they are mostly brown in colour. Most adult ticks in this genus do not have colour patterns on their scutum (inornate). Many taxa are very similar, without clear distinguishing features. Identification is often further frustrated by intraspecies variation. While males are reliably distinct, instar and female specimens are sometimes impossible to identify due to the lack of differential morphological features.

== Disease potential ==
Rhipicephalus parasitism is of significant economic, medical, and veterinary importance. Many species are vectors of pathogens of humans and animals, including causing East Coast fever, anaplasmosis, babesiosis, rickettsiosis, Boutonneuse fever, Lyme disease, Q fever, Rocky Mountain spotted fever, NSDV and Crimean–Congo hemorrhagic fever. In addition to the infectious agents spread by ticks, tick bites can lead to allergic and toxic reactions.

Some species can cause tick paralysis by injecting a neurotoxin with their bite, such as Rhipicephalus evertsi and Rhipicephalus warburtoni.

== Sex pheromone studies ==
A number of Rhipicephalus spp. females produce phenol and p-cresol after being fed for six days. These compounds may act as sex pheromones since these compounds were shown to be the sex pheromone of Rhipicephalus appendiculatus.

== Etymology ==
The name Rhipicephalus is derived from the Greek word rhiphis, meaning "fan-like", and κεφαλή, kephalē, meaning "head". The two terms are related to the hexagonal basis capituli of Rhipicephalus.

== Species ==
As of 2025, the genus contains 90 recognised species:

- Rhipicephalus afranicus Bakkes, 2020
- Rhipicephalus (Boophilus) annulatus Say, 1821
- Rhipicephalus appendiculatus Neumann 1901 – brown ear tick
- Rhipicephalus aquatilis Walker, Keirans & Pegram, 1993
- Rhipicephalus armatus Pocock, 1900
- Rhipicephalus arnoldi Theiler & Zumpt, 1949
- Rhipicephalus aurantiacus Neumann, 1907 (Note: Provisionally valid; possibly a synonym of R. ziemanni)
- Rhipicephalus australis Fuller, 1899
- Rhipicephalus bequaerti Zumpt, 1949
- Rhipicephalus bergeoni Morel & Balis, 1976
- Rhipicephalus boueti Morel, 1957
- Rhipicephalus bursa Canestrini & Fanzago, 1878
- Rhipicephalus camicasi Morel, Mouchet & Rodhain, 1976
- Rhipicephalus capensis Koch, 1844
- Rhipicephalus carnivoralis Walker, 1966
- Rhipicephalus cliffordi Morel, 1965 (Note: Treated as a synonym of R. pseudolongus in Walker et al. (2000))
- Rhipicephalus complanatus Neumann, 1911
- Rhipicephalus compositus Neumann, 1897
- Rhipicephalus congolensis Apanaskevich, Horak & Mulumba-Mfumu, 2013
- Rhipicephalus cuspidatus Neumann, 1906
- Rhipicephalus (Boophilus) decoloratus Koch, 1844
- Rhipicephalus deltoideus Neumann, 1910
- Rhipicephalus distinctus Bedford 1932
- Rhipicephalus duttoni Neumann, 1907
- Rhipicephalus dux Dönitz, 1910
- Rhipicephalus evertsi Neumann, 1897
- Rhipicephalus exophthalmos Keirans & Walker 1993
- Rhipicephalus follis Dönitz, 1910
- Rhipicephalus fulvus Neumann, 1913
- Rhipicephalus (Boophilus) geigyi Aeschlimann & Morel, 1965
- Rhipicephalus gertrudae Feldman-Muhsam, 1960
- Rhipicephalus glabroscutatus Du Toit, 1941
- Rhipicephalus guilhoni Morel & Vassiliades, 1963
- Rhipicephalus haemaphysaloides Supino, 1897
- Rhipicephalus hibericus Millán, Rodriguez-Pastor & Estrada-Peña, 2024 (Note: R. hibericus is suspect. Millán et al. (2024) described R. hibericus from ticks, relying primarily on reproductive isolation experiments, but used specimens (Zaragoza, Spain) that were not from the type locality (Montpellier, France). Kelava et al. (2025) and Dantas-Torres (2024) both found that the species was not distinct, genetically, from R. sanguineus s.s.)
- Rhipicephalus humeralis Rondelli, 1926 (Note: Females and instars are very similar to R. pulchellus)
- Rhipicephalus hurti Wilson, 1954 (Note: Highly similar to R. jeanneli)
- Rhipicephalus interventus Walker, Pegram & Keirans, 1995
- Rhipicephalus jeanneli Neumann 1913
- Rhipicephalus kochi Dönitz, 1905
- Rhipicephalus (Boophilus) kohlsi Hoogstraal & Kaiser, 1960
- Rhipicephalus leporis Pomerantsev, 1946
- Rhipicephalus linnaei (Audouin, 1826)
- Rhipicephalus longiceps Warburton 1912
- Rhipicephalus longicoxatus Neumann, 1905
- Rhipicephalus longus Neumann, 1907
- Rhipicephalus lounsburyi Walker, 1990
- Rhipicephalus lunulatus Neumann 1907
- Rhipicephalus maculatus Neumann, 1901
- Rhipicephalus masseyi Nuttall & Warburton 1908
- Rhipicephalus (Boophilus) microplus Canestrini, 1888
- Rhipicephalus moucheti Morel, 1965
- Rhipicephalus muehlensi Zumpt, 1943
- Rhipicephalus muhsamae Morel & Vassiliades, 1965
- Rhipicephalus neumanni Walker, 1990
- Rhipicephalus nitens Neumann, 1904
- Rhipicephalus oculatus Neumann 1901
- Rhipicephalus oreotragi Walker & Horak, 2000
- Rhipicephalus pilans Schulze, 1935
- Rhipicephalus planus Neumann, 1907
- Rhipicephalus praetextatus Gerstäcker, 1873
- Rhipicephalus pravus Dönitz, 1910
- Rhipicephalus pseudolongus Santos Dias, 1953
- Rhipicephalus pulchellus Gerstäcker, 1873
- Rhipicephalus pumilio Schulze, 1935
- Rhipicephalus punctatus Warburton 1912
- Rhipicephalus pusillus Gil Collado, 1936
- Rhipicephalus ramachandrai Dhanda, 1966
- Rhipicephalus rossicus Yakimov & Kol-Yakimova, 1911
- Rhipicephalus rutilus Koch, 1844
- Rhipicephalus sanguineus Latreille, 1806 – brown dog tick
- Rhipicephalus scalpturatus Santos Dias, 1959
- Rhipicephalus schulzei Olenev 1929
- Rhipicephalus sculptus Warburton 1912
- Rhipicephalus secundus Feldman-Muhsam, 1952
- Rhipicephalus senegalensis Koch, 1844
- Rhipicephalus serranoi Santos Dias 1950
- Rhipicephalus simpsoni Nuttall 1910
- Rhipicephalus simus Koch, 1844
- Rhipicephalus sulcatus Neumann, 1908
- Rhipicephalus supertritus Neumann, 1907
- Rhipicephalus tetracornus Kitaoka & Suzuki, 1983
- Rhipicephalus theileri Bedford & Hewitt, 1925
- Rhipicephalus tricuspis Dönitz, 1906
- Rhipicephalus turanicus Pomerantsev, 1936
- Rhipicephalus walkerae Horak, Apanaskevich and Kariuki, 2013
- Rhipicephalus warburtoni Walker & Horak, 2000
- Rhipicephalus zambeziensis Walker, Norval & Corwin, 1981
- Rhipicephalus ziemanni Neumann, 1904
- Rhipicephalus zumpti Santos Dias, 1950

=== Unrecognised ===
- Rhipicephalus hoogstraali Kolonin, 2009 (Note: Invalid as a nomen nudum as per Guglielmone et al. (2010))

=== Rhipicephalus sanguineus species complex ===
Rhipicephalus includes a clade centred around the brown dog tick, Rhipicephalus sanguineus. The taxonomy is currently in flux as phylogenies are developed. The species complex contains 16 known species-level lineages, but these often do not map singularly or wholly onto known species. Some species that are prima facie in the complex are yet to be sequenced:

- R. afranicus Bakkes, 2020 - 'Afrotropical lineage'
- R. camicasi Morel, Mouchet & Rodhain, 1976
- R. guilhoni Morel & Vassiliades, 1963
- R. leporis Pomerantsev, 1946 (Note: This species has not been confirmed to cluster, genetically, within the complex.)
- R. linnaei Audouin, 1826 - 'tropical lineage'
- R. moucheti Morel, 1965 (Note: This species has not been confirmed to cluster, genetically, within the complex.)
- R. pumilio Schulze, 1935
- R. pusillus Gil Collado, 1936
- R. rossicus Yakimov & Kol-Yakimova, 1911
- R. rutilus Koch, 1844 - 'southeastern European lineage'
- R. sanguineus sensu stricto Latreille, 1806
- R. schulzei Olenev 1929 (Note: This species has not been confirmed to cluster, genetically, within the complex.)
- R. secundus Feldman-Muhsam, 1952
- R. sulcatus Neumann, 1908
- R. turanicus Pomerantsev, 1936

==== Suspect ====
- Rhipicephalus bergeoni Morel & Balis, 1976 (Note: Although R. burgeoni is traditionally included in the species complex, it has not been able to be resolved within the group. Dantas‑Torres et al (2024) considers it separate.)
- Rhipicephalus hibericus Millán, Rodriguez-Pastor & Estrada-Peña, 2024 (Note: Although Millán et al (2024) describe the species with differential morphology and reproductive isolation, Kelava et al (2025) found the species clusters with the R. sanguineus s.s. clade with a pairwise genetic difference of less than 0.5% Dantas-Torres, Sousa-Paula & Otranto (2024) report similar findings. R. hibericus is likely a synonym of R. sanguineus sensu stricto.)

=== Subgenus Boophilus ===
Boophilus was once considered a separate genus, but studies in the early 2000s resulted in Boophilus being made a subgenus of Rhipicephalus. Although Boophilus has been included in the Rhipicephalus genus, their morphology is different from the typical Rhipicephalus species.
