= Harry Hoogstraal =

American entomologist

- Hoogstraal in the mid-1960s
- Born: 24 February 1917; Chicago, Illinois, United States
- Died: 24 February 1986 (aged 69); Cairo, Egypt
- Education: London School of Hygiene and Tropical Medicine
- Scientific career
- Workplaces: U.S. Naval Medical Research Unit No. 3

Notes
- Photo courtesy of Chris Maser.

Harry Hoogstraal (February 24, 1917 Chicago, Illinois – February 24, 1986 Cairo, Egypt) was an American entomologist and parasitologist. He was described as "the greatest authority on ticks and tickborne diseases who ever lived." The American Society of Tropical Medicine and Hygiene's Harry Hoogstraal Medal for Outstanding Achievement in Medical Entomology honors his contributions to science.

== Life and work ==
Hoogstraal earned Bachelor of Arts and Master of Science degrees (1938 and 1942) from the University of Illinois Chicago, before his training was interrupted by World War II to serve as an officer entomologist (1943–1946) in the United States Army. He later received Ph.D. (1959) and Doctor of Science (1971) degrees from the London School of Hygiene and Tropical Medicine. As a master's degree candidate at the University of Illinois, he organized and led (1938–1941) four multi-disciplinary biological expeditions into the mountain and desert portions of western and southwestern Mexico. These resulted in the amassing of large, scientifically valuable collections of animals and plants. During World War II, Hoogstraal was assigned to the U.S. Army 19th Medical General Laboratory, near Hollandia, Dutch New Guinea, where in 1945 he and Willard V. King engaged in a massive taxonomic study of the mosquitoes of that area. Their time for working up and publishing on their large and rich New Guinea mosquito collection was limited by the forward movement of the war and by the necessity for involvement in other projects in the war's aftermath, but they published descriptions of 36 new species of mosquitoes from their New Guinea collections in a series of 11 papers that contributed to an understanding of the rich and then largely unknown culicid fauna of the southwest Pacific. Additionally, their collections, deposited in the U.S. National Museum, have through the intervening years served as a rich resource to many other individuals involved in taxonomic research on Southwest Pacific mosquitoes.

With the end of World War II, Hoogstraal did not seek an early return to the United States as did most of his Army colleagues. Instead, he took his discharge in Manila and, under the auspices of the Field Museum, organized a major biological expedition into the interior of the Philippine islands of Mindanao and Palawan (1946-1947) and spent the next two years exploring and collecting in those biologically poorly known islands. The collections resulting from his efforts were the richest ever made from those portions of the Philippines. Following his return from the Philippines in 1948, he joined, as an employee of the United States Navy Bureau of Medicine and Surgery, the University of California African Expedition in 1948–1949. This began his lifelong sojourn in Africa. At the completion of this expedition he continued on for a while in Madagascar and then moved to Cairo, to organize and become Head of the Department of Medical Zoology, U.S. Naval Medical Research Unit No. 3 (NAMRU-3), a position which he held for the remainder of his life.

At NAMRU-3 he devoted much of his time to gathering collections of scientifically valuable specimens from remote or little-studied areas of the world and contributing them freely to institutions and specialists everywhere. He often worked eighteen hours a day, and was known to be very productive, as demonstrated by the fact that during his lifetime he authored or co-authored more than 500 publications, edited many more and directed the translation of over 1,800 scientific papers and books. He was a member of more than 30 professional societies, served in a volunteer capacity in at least 20 professional and editorial posts, lectured on countless occasions to scientific groups, participated in the graduate training of a number of students, and built and managed for many years an outstanding Department of Medical Zoology at NAMRU-3 in Cairo. His collaborators included parasitologists as Dr. Gertrud Theiler and Dr. Jane Brotherton Walker.

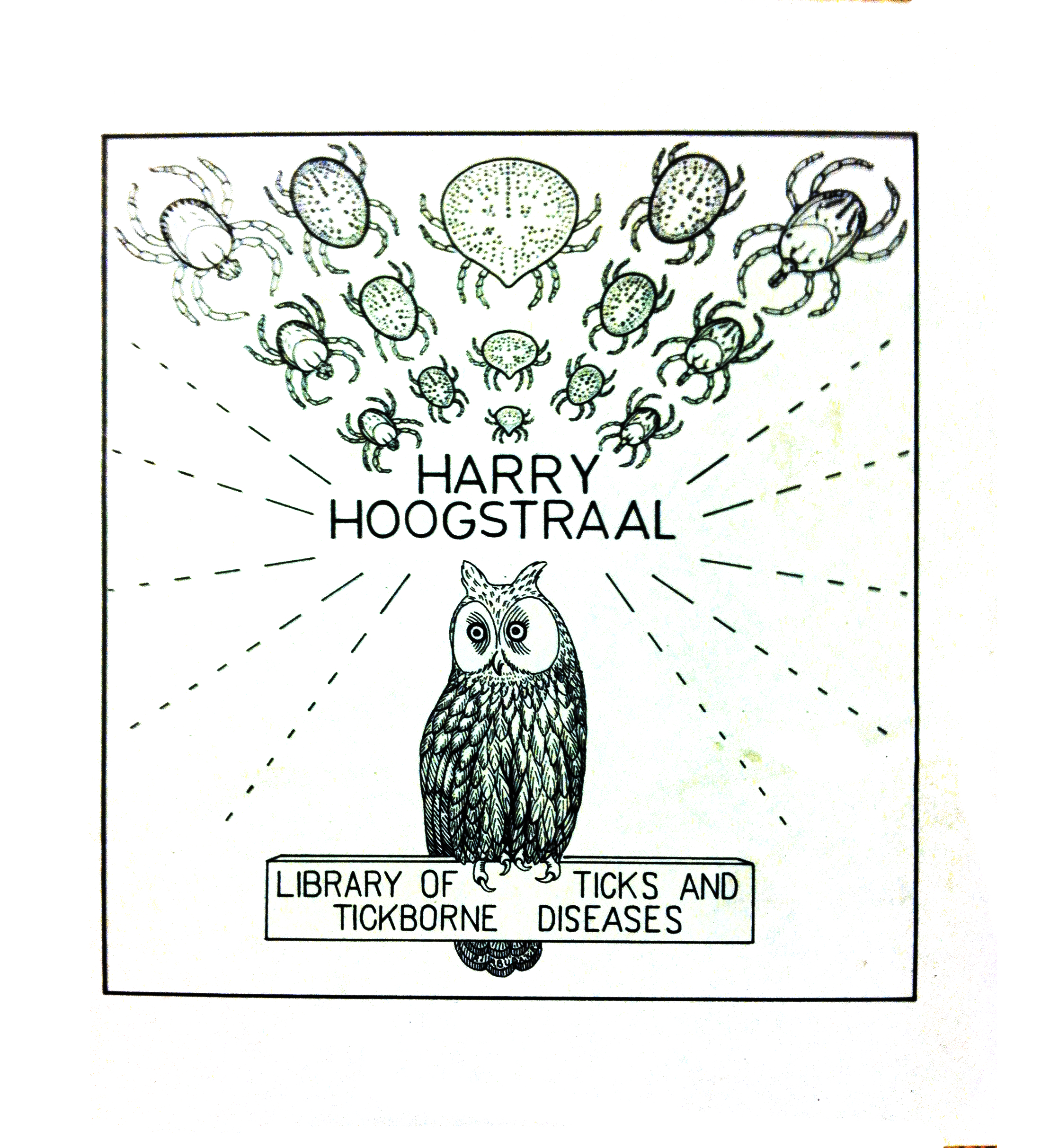
Bookplate of entomologist Harry Hoogstraal, featuring an owl of knowledge and ticks

== Honors ==
During his life, Hoogstraal received a host of professional honors, including the Henry Baldwin Ward Medal of the American Society of Parasitologists in 1967; the Presidential Order of Merit First Class of the Arab Republic of Egypt in 1978; and the Walter Reed Medal of the American Society of Tropical Medicine and Hygiene also in 1978. He was awarded a Doctorat Honoris Causa degree by Ain Shams University in 1978, and an Honorary Doctor of Science degree by the University of Khartoum in 1983.

== Species named in honor of Harry Hoogstraal ==
Hoogstraal's name has been extensively memorialized in scientific nomenclature. Ten years prior to his death, the number of species with the species epithet hoogstraali (and related derivations such as hoogstraalia, hoogstraaliana, and hoogstraaliter) is said to have numbered more than 200.

A selection of these species includes:

- the colubrid snake Telescopus hoogstraali Schmidt & Marx, 1956,
- the Busuanga squirrel Sundasciurus hoogstraali (Sanborn, 1952),
- the Hoogstraal's gerbil Gerbillus hoogstraali (Lay, 1975),
- Hoogstraal's striped grass mouse, Lemniscomys hoogstraali (Dieterlen, 1991),
- the yellow-spotted rock hyrax Heterohyrax brucei hoogstraali (Setzer, 1956),
- and the passerine bird Irena cyanogastra hoogstraali (Rand, 1948).

Arthropods include:

- the mosquitoes Aedes (Stegomyia) hoogstraali (Knight and Rozeboom, 1946) and Tripteroides (Tripteroides) hoogstraali (Baisas, 1947),
- the batflies Brachytarsina hoogstraali (Jobling, 1951) and Strebla hoogstraali (Wenzel, 1966),
- the stag beetle Figulus hoogstraali (Benesh, 1958),
- the longhorn beetle Tethionea hoogstraali (Gressitt, 1951),
- the predaceous ground beetle Bembidion (Cillenus) hoogstraali (Darlington, 1959),
- the sand fly Sergentomyia (Neophlebotomus) hoogstraali (Fairchild, 1952),
- the ceratophyllid flea Foxella hoogstraali (Traub, 1950),
- the gerrid bug Potamometropsis hoogstraali (Hungerford, 1957),
- the fly Idiocera hoogstraali (Alexander, 1946),
- the ceratopogonid midge Camptopterohelea hoogstraali (Wirth, 1960),
- the mallophagan louse Psittoecus hoogstraali (Guimarães, 1974),
- the scarabaeid beetle Onthophagus hoogstraali (Saylor, 1943),
- the sharpshooter leafhopper Cofana hoogstraali (Young, 1979),
- the caddisfly Plectropsyche hoogstraali (Ross, 1947),
- the proturan insects Eosentomon hoogstraali (Nosek, 1973) and Nosekiella hoogstraali (Nosek, 1980),
- the macronyssid mite Parasteatonyssus hoogstraali (Keegan, 1951),
- the ixodid ticks Ixodes hoogstraali (Arthur, 1955) and Rhipicephalus hoogstraali (Kolonin, 2009), and
- the harvestman Leiobunum hoogstraali (Goodnight & Goodnight, 1942).

Other eponymous species include the protozoan parasites Leishmania hoogstraali (McMillan, 1965) and Isospora hoogstraali (Prasad, 1961), the "candidatus" Rickettsia Rickettsia hoogstraalii Mattila et al. 2007, and the nematode Icosiella hoogstraali (Schmidt & Kuntz, 1969).
