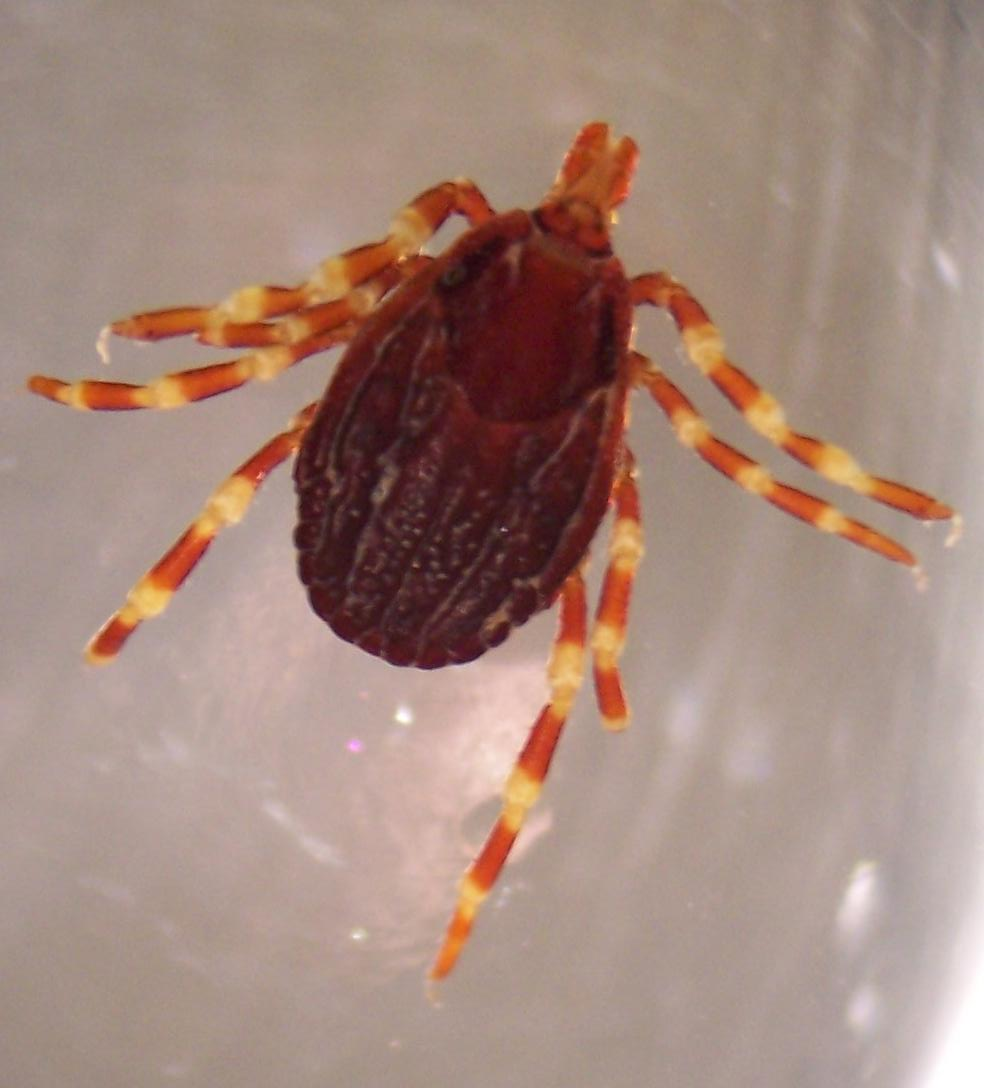
- Hyalomma marginatum specimen in alcohol

Scientific classification
- Kingdom: Animalia
- Phylum: Arthropoda
- Subphylum: Chelicerata
- Class: Arachnida
- Order: Ixodida
- Family: Ixodidae
- Genus: Hyalomma; Koch, 1844

Species
- 28, see text

= Hyalomma =

Genus of ticks

Hyalomma is a genus of hard-bodied ticks common in Asia, Europe, and North Africa. They are also found in Southern Africa. The name is derived from Greek: Hyalos (ὕαλος) crystal, glass; and omma (oμμα) eye. The genus is believed to have originated in Iran or Central Asia, and then spread further into Asia, including the Middle East, and to southern Europe and Africa.

== Description ==
Hyalomma are large ticks, with a dark scutum, distinct festoons and eyes. The genus is sometimes referred to as 'bont-legged ticks' due to the presence of light-colored bands on the legs; not to be confused with Amblyomma, which are called 'bont ticks'. Hyalomma species are often difficult to identify due to their hybridization and genetic and morphological variations, caused by harsh environmental conditions and lack of food sources. With few hosts available, they are required to be active as soon as a potential host is sensed.

== Parasitism ==
Adult Hyalomma can bite humans and transmit serious pathogens. Immature (nymph) Hyalomma usually feed on birds, rodents, and hares and can be the cause of viral disease and rickettsioses. Nymphs are often transmitted from one place to another by migrating birds. For example, a migrating bird carrying a Hyalomma marginatum nymph can cause Crimean-Congo hemorrhagic fever. Hyalomma species can also transmit rickettsias like Siberian tick typhus, Boutonneuse fever, and Q-fever.

== Taxonomy ==
Hyalomma form part of the Rhipicephalinae subfamily, in the broader Amblyocephalus clade of the Ixodidae.

- Ixodidae
  - - Prostriata
      Ixodes
  - Metastriata
    - Robertsicus
    - - Amblyocephalus
        - Amblyomma
        - - Dermacentor
          - - Rhipicentor
            - - Hyalomma
              - Rhipicephalus
      - Haematobothrion
        - - Cryptocroton
          - Bothriocroton
        - - Archaeocroton
          - Alloceraea
        - Haemaphysalis

Ixodidae cladogram after Barker et al., (2024)

== Species ==
As of 2025, there are 27 species described as Hyalomma:

- Hyalomma aegyptium Linnaeus, 1758
- Hyalomma albiparmatum Schulze, 1919 (Note: H. albiparmatum is poorly differentiated from H. nitidum and H. truncatum, and may be a synonym of the latter.)
- Hyalomma anatolicum Koch, 1844
- Hyalomma arabica Pegram, Hoogstraal & Wassef, 1982
- Hyalomma asiaticum Schulze and Schlottke, 1929
- Hyalomma brevipunctatum Sharif, 1928
- Hyalomma dromedarii Koch, 1844
- Hyalomma excavatum Koch, 1844 (Note: Often regarded as a subspecies of H. anatolicum. Currently considered distinct as per Guglielmone et al. (2020))
- Hyalomma franchinii Tonelli-Rondelli, 1932
- Hyalomma glabrum Delpy, 1949
- Hyalomma hussaini Sharif, 1928
- Hyalomma hystricis Dhanda & Raja, 1974
- Hyalomma impeltatum Schulze & Schlottke, 1930
- Hyalomma impressum Koch, 1844
- Hyalomma isaaci Sharif, 1928
- Hyalomma kumari Sharif, 1928
- Hyalomma lusitanicum Koch, 1844
- Hyalomma marginatum Koch, 1844
- Hyalomma nitidum Schulze, 1919
- Hyalomma punt Hoogstraal, Kaiser & Pedersen, 1969
- Hyalomma rhipicephaloides Neumann, 1901
- Hyalomma rufipes Koch, 1844
- Hyalomma schulzei Olenev, 1931
- Hyalomma scupense Schulze, 1919
- Hyalomma somalicum Tonelli-Rondelli, 1935 (Note: See Apanaskevich & Horak (2009), citing previous studies where specimens determined as Hyalomma erythraeum Tonelli-Rondelli, 1932 then later considered misidentified, contra Hyalomma impeltatum Schulze & Schlottke, 1930.)
- Hyalomma truncatum Koch, 1844
- Hyalomma turanicum Pomerantsev, 1946
