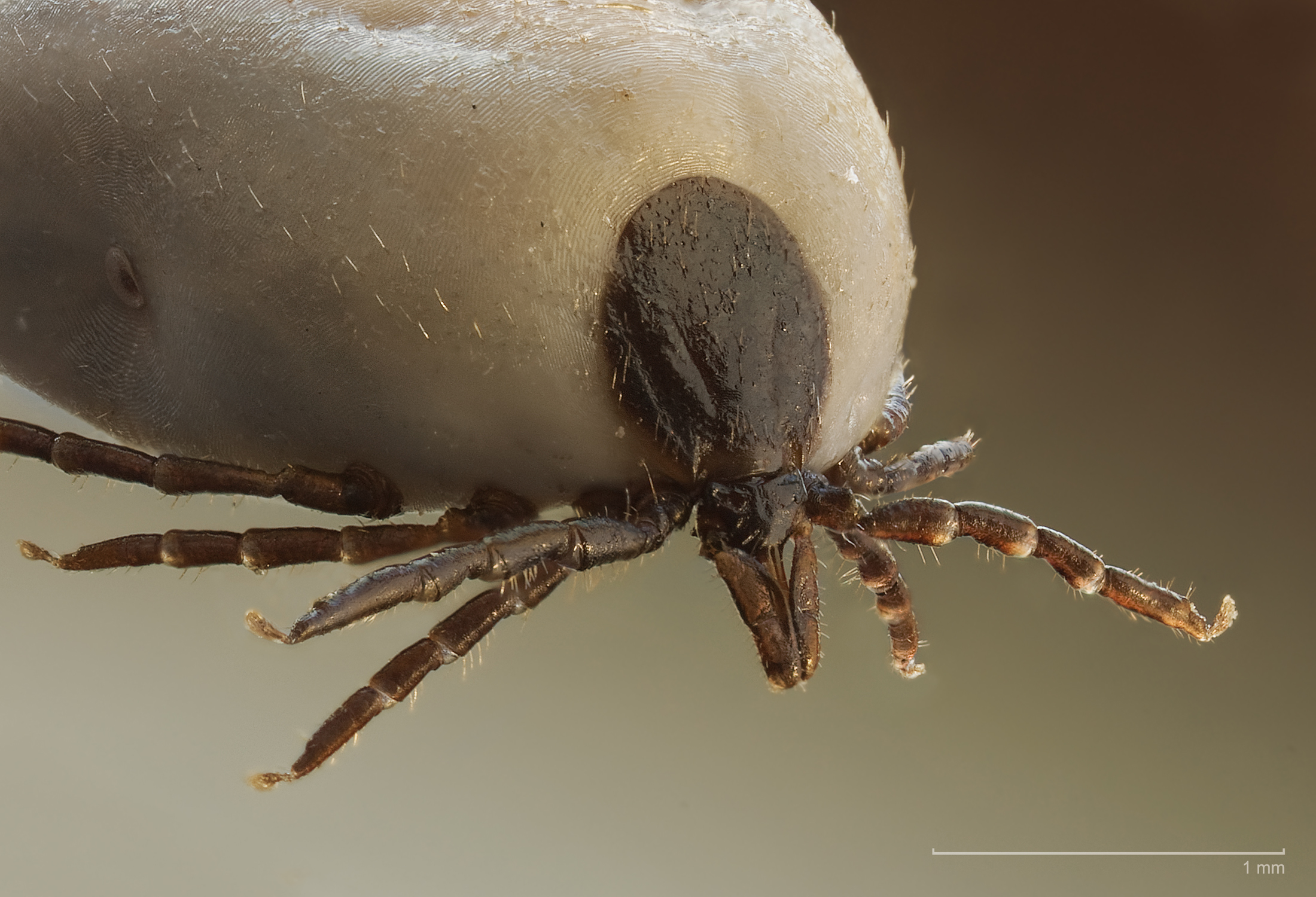
- Ixodes ricinus (engorged)

Scientific classification
- Kingdom: Animalia
- Phylum: Arthropoda
- Subphylum: Chelicerata
- Class: Arachnida
- Order: Ixodida
- Superfamily: Ixodoidea
- Family: Ixodidae; C. L. Koch, 1844

Diversity
- 18 genera, about 769 species

= Ixodidae =

Ixodidae Temporal range: Cretaceous–present

Family of ticks

The Ixodidae are the family of hard ticks or scale ticks, one of the three families of ticks, consisting of 750 species, as of 2025. They are known as 'hard ticks' because they have a scutum or hard shield, which the other major family of ticks, the 'soft ticks' (Argasidae), lack. They are ectoparasites of a wide range of host species, and some are vectors of pathogens that can cause human disease.

== Description ==
The Ixodidae are distinguished from the Argasidae by the presence of a scutum. In both the nymph and the adult, a prominent gnathosoma (or capitulum, mouth and feeding parts) projects forward from the animal's body; in the Argasidae, conversely, the gnathosoma is concealed beneath the body.

Ixodidae attach to a host bite painlessly and are generally unnoticed, and they remain in place until they engorge and are ready to moult; this process may take days or weeks. Some species drop off the host to moult in a safe place, whereas others remain on the same host and only drop off once they are ready to lay their eggs.

== Classification ==
The Ixodidae is divided into two groups: the Prostriata and the Metastriata, distinguished by the position of the anal groove, which is anterior in the former, and posterior in the latter. The Metastriata are further divided into two lineages, Amblyocephalus and Haematobothrion. As of 2025, the Ixodidae is composed of 769 extant species in 18 genera, in addition to two fossil genera.

- Ixodidae
  - - Prostriata
      Ixodes
  - Metastriata
    - Robertsicus
    - - Amblyocephalus
        - Amblyomma
        - - Dermacentor
          - - Rhipicentor
            - - Hyalomma
              - Rhipicephalus
      - Haematobothrion
        - - Cryptocroton
          - Bothriocroton
        - - Archaeocroton
          - Alloceraea
        - Haemaphysalis

Ixodidae cladogram after Barker et al., (2024)

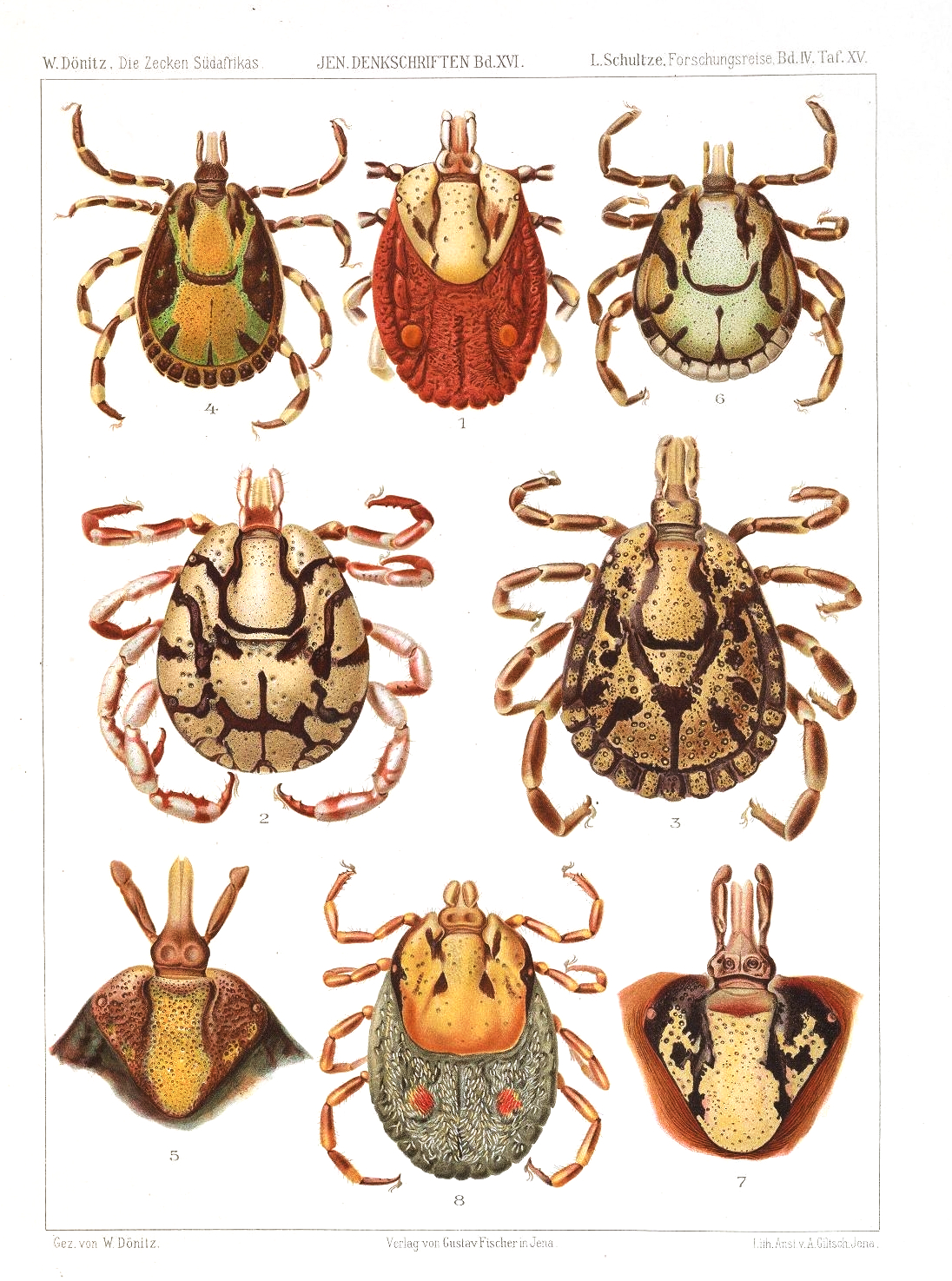
The Ixodidae is composed of a wide range of genera. The family is distinguished by the presence of a hard, shell-like scutum

Lineage		Genera	# of Species
Prostriata	Ixodinae	Ixodes Latreille, 1795	274
Metastriata	Amblyocephalus	Amblyomma Koch, 1844	135 (Note: The elevation of Africaniella in 2020, and Cryptocroton in 2024 reduces the count of this genus in Guglielmone et al (2020) by three.)
		Anomalohimalaya Hoogstraal, Kaiser & Mitchell, 1970	3
		Cosmiomma Schulze, 1919	1
		Dermacentor Koch, 1844	43
		Hyalomma Koch, 1844	28
		Margaropus Karsch, 1879	3
		Nosomma Schulze, 1919	1 (Note: N. keralensis was proposed in 2007, but has subsequently been rejected)
		Rhipicentor Nuttall & Warburton, 1908	2
		Rhipicephalus Koch, 1844	90
	Haematobothrion	Alloceraea Schulze, 1919	6
		Archaeocroton Dumbleton, 1943	1
		Bothriocroton Keirans, King & Sharrad, 1994	7
		Cryptocroton Barker & Barker	1
		Haemaphysalis Koch, 1844	170 (Note: The elevation of Alloceraea in 2024 reduces the count of this genus in Guglielmone et al (2020) by six.)
		Sharifiella Santos Dias, 1958	1
	Unresolved	Africaniella Travassos Dias, 1974	2
		Robertsicus Barker & Burger, 2018	1
			769

Fossil genera (Note: Other genera, such as Alloceraea and Bothriocroton have recognised paleobiota species)

- †Compluriscutula - 1 species, Poinar and Buckley 2008 Burmese amber, Myanmar, Cenomanian
- †Cornupalpatum - 1 species, Poinar and Brown 2003 Burmese amber, Myanmar, Cenomanian

The Ixodidae is also sometimes classified by its subfamilies, but the current formulations do not encompass all species. There are currently five recognised subfamilies:

- Amblyomminae - comprising Amblyomma.
- Bothriocrotoninae - comprising Bothriocroton.
- Haemaphysalinae - comprising Haemaphysalis.
- Ixodinae - comprising Ixodes.
- Rhipicephalinae - comprising Dermacentor, Margaropus, Rhipicephalus, Rhipicentor, Hyalomma and Nosomma. (Note: Hyalomma and Nosomma were formerly considered part of the Hyalomminae, but this subfamily has subsequently been sunk into the Rhipicephalinae.)

== Medical importance ==
Many hard ticks are of considerable medical importance, acting as vectors of diseases caused by bacteria, protozoa, and viruses, such as Rickettsia and Borrelia. Other tick-borne diseases include Lyme disease, babesiosis, ehrlichiosis, Rocky Mountain spotted fever, anaplasmosis, Southern tick-associated rash illness, tick-borne relapsing fever, tularemia, Colorado tick fever, Powassan encephalitis, and Q fever. Ixodid ticks are the primary vectors of tick paralysis, which can affect domestic dogs, cats and livestock, as well as humans.

== See also ==
- Ticks of domestic animals
