= Aponomma =

Scientific classification
- Kingdom: Animalia
- Phylum: Arthropoda
- Subphylum: Chelicerata
- Class: Arachnida
- Order: Ixodida
- Family: Ixodidae
- Genus: Amblyomma
- Subgenus: Aponomma; Lahille, 1905

Subgenus of ticks

Aponomma is a subgenus of Amblyomma, a genus of hard ticks.

Prior to 2002, Aponomma was a full rank genus of eyeless, primarily reptile ticks. The genus was fragmented in 1972, with the proposal of three distinct groups. In 1999, nuclear rDNA analysis confirmed that the genus was paraphyletic, and following this finding, the genus was redistributed. The taxon remains as a subgenus, grouping together eyeless Amblyomma.

== Species ==
- Amblyomma (Aponomma) arcanum Karsch, 1879
- Amblyomma (Aponomma) crassipes Neumann, 1901
- Amblyomma (Aponomma) exornatum Koch, 1844
- Amblyomma (Aponomma) fimbriatum Koch, 1844
- Amblyomma (Aponomma) flavomaculatum Lucas, 1846
- Amblyomma (Aponomma) fuscolineatum Lucas, 1847
- Amblyomma (Aponomma) gervaisi Lucas, 1847
- Amblyomma (Aponomma) inopinatum Santos Dias, 1989
- Amblyomma (Aponomma) komodoense Oudemans, 1928
- Amblyomma (Aponomma) kraneveldi Anastos, 1956
- Amblyomma (Aponomma) latum Koch, 1844
- Amblyomma (Aponomma) pattoni Neumann, 1910
- Amblyomma (Aponomma) quadricavum Schulze, 1941
- Amblyomma (Aponomma) soembawense Anastos, 1956
- Amblyomma (Aponomma) trimaculatum Lucas, 1878
- Amblyomma (Aponomma) varanense Supino, 1897

=== Former species ===
- Africaniella transversale Lucas, 1845
- Alloceraea colasbelcouri Santos Dias, 1958
- Archaeocroton sphenodonti Dumbleton, 1943
- Bothriocroton auruginans Schulze, 1936
- Bothriocroton concolor Neumann, 1899
- Bothriocroton glebopalma Keirans, King & Sharrad, 1994
- Bothriocroton hydrosauri Denny, 1843
- Bothriocroton tachyglossi Roberts, 1953
- Bothriocroton undatum Fabricius, 1775
- Robertsicus elaphensis Karsch, 1879
