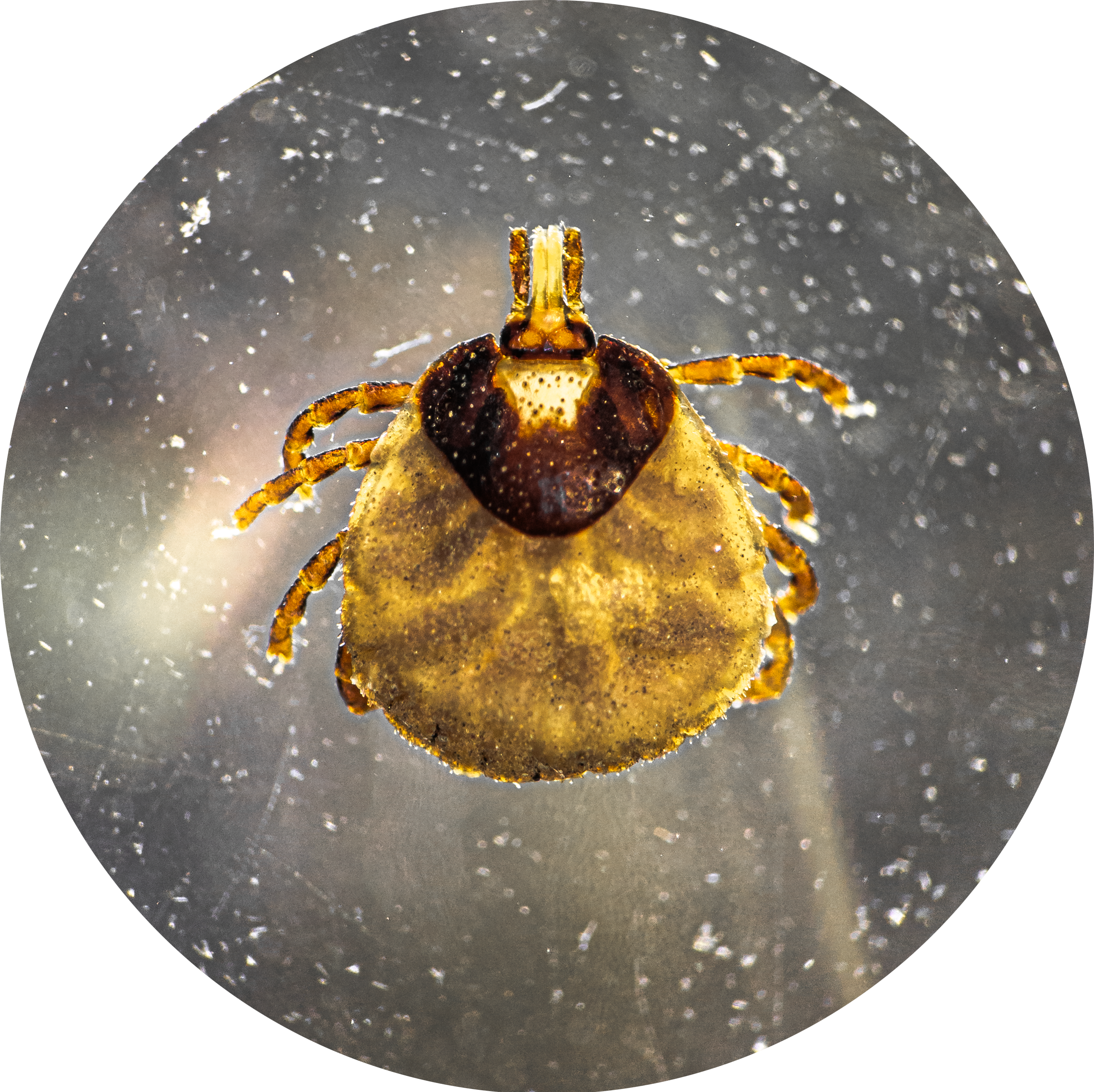
- Light micrograph of female B. undatum.

Scientific classification
- Kingdom: Animalia
- Phylum: Arthropoda
- Subphylum: Chelicerata
- Class: Arachnida
- Order: Ixodida
- Family: Ixodidae
- Subfamily: Bothriocrotoninae
- Genus: Bothriocroton; Keirans, King & Sharrad, 1994

Type species
- B. glebopalma Keirans, King & Sharrad, 1994

= Bothriocroton =

Bothriocroton Temporal range: Cenomanian–present

Genus of ticks

- Ixodidae
  - - Prostriata
      Ixodes
  - Metastriata
    - Robertsicus
    - - Amblyocephalus
        - Amblyomma
        - - Dermacentor
          - - Rhipicentor
            - - Hyalomma
              - Rhipicephalus
      - Haematobothrion
        - - Cryptocroton
          - Bothriocroton
        - - Archaeocroton
          - Alloceraea
        - Haemaphysalis

Ixodidae cladogram after Barker et al., (2024)

Bothriocroton is a genus of hard ticks. There are nine extant member species, native to Australia and New Guinea. Bothriocroton species typically parasitise monotremes, marsupials, and reptiles.

== Evolutionary history & geographic distribution ==
Like other Ixodid ticks, Bothriocroton likely emerged in Gondwana, although a more precise point of origin has not been identified. The Prostriata (modern Ixodes) likely diverged from the Metastriata 234 ± 18 Ma. Basal metastriate lineages, including the Bothriocrotoninae are thought to have originated around 180 ± 15 Ma.

Early Bothriocroton species likely dispersed throughout the Australian landmass, alongside other early metastriata lineages such as Amblyomminae, Khimairidae and Nuttalliellidae. Bothriocroton species likely crossed and occupied Burma terrane over the Incertus Arc following its formation around 155 Ma. As a result, many Ixodida paleobiota, including Bothriocrotoninae, are best known from studies of Burmese amber. B. muelleri, described in 2023, is the only known fossil species attributed to Bothriocroton. The window for Burmese colonisation was brief, with the land connections being lost ~ 140 Ma.

Whatever the diversity of Asian Bothriocroton may have been, it likely collapsed by the mid-Creatceous. Modern Bothriocroton are found only in Australasia, east of the Wallace Line, specifically Australia and New Guinea, formerly comprising Sahul. Climate variability, particularly Australian desertification, has driven the formerly transcontinental distributions of some species to retreat to coastal and subcoastal regions over time.

== Ecology ==
Bothriocroton lifecycles and ecological behaviour are generally poorly known. The exception to this is B. hydrosauri, the southern reptile tick, which, along with the newly distinguished B. bulli, is the most thoroughly studied tick of wildlife in the world. Assumptions of the behaviour of other Bothriocroton species are primarily derived from their relationship to the B. hydrosauri species group (hydrosauri, bulli, dahlbergi).

Bothriocroton are thought to be three-host-ticks, meaning that between each life stage (larvae, nymph, adult), the ticks drop off the host to moult or lay eggs. Reptile Bothriocroton, including B. hydrosauri, B. glebopalma and B. undatum are understood to be 'ambush' ticks, dropping off the host in the lizard's refuge, which permits easy access to hosts, which reliably return to the same place. As such, the need to quest is negated. The remaining Bothriocroton are primarily echidna ticks (B. concolor, B. spratti, B. dahlbergi & B. oudemansi), with B. auruginans being a wombat tick. Wombats return reliably to one or more burrows in their home range, which may permit B. auruginans life stages to similarly employ an 'ambush' strategy. Echidnas, however, 'wander' around a home range without consistent 'ambush' sites, meaning that echidna Bothriocroton may quest more actively.

== Vector studies ==
Bothriocroton ticks have a limited pathogenic profile.

B. hydrosauri (southern reptile tick), is a vector of Rickettsia honei, the causative bacteria of Flinders Island spotted fever. The disease is generally mild, without recorded fatalities. One study identified that chronically unwell patients had a significantly higher seropositivity rate for R. honei, but it is not clear whether the infections were causally related to their illnesses.

B. concolor (echidna tick) carries Borrelia tachyglossi, and B. undatum carries Borrelia undatumii, but these bacteria are phylogenetically distinct from Lyme disease or relapsing fever Borrelia, and have not been shown to be pathogenic to humans. Lyme disease Borrelia are carried exclusively by certain prostriate (Ixodes) ticks, none of which are endemic to Australia.

== Description ==
Bothriocroton are large (2-7mm), round ticks. Their mouthparts are long, with lateral palpal margins narrower than their basis capitulum. Species often have regions of dense punctation on the female scutum and male conscutum. They are further characterised by a posterior anal groove, and absence of sclerotised adanal plates. They have no eyes. The reported synapomorphy for Bothriocroton is three pairs of large wax glands on segment VIII of the larvae.

Bothriocroton may be mistaken for the two species of eyeless Amblyomma (Aponomma) native to Australia - A. fimbriatum and A. trimaculatum. Unlike these species, however, Bothriocroton species do not have iridescent or metallic ornamentation. Additionally, all reptile Bothriocroton have distinct lateral grooves in the male.

== Taxonomy ==
- Bothriocroton
  - - - - - Bothriocroton hydrosauri
          - Bothriocroton bulli
        - Bothriocroton dahlbergi
      - Bothriocroton undatum
    - Bothriocroton auruginans
  - - Bothriocroton concolor
    - Bothriocroton spratti

Bothriocroton species cladogram after complete mitochondrial genome phylogenies recovered in Kelava et al. (2026). B. glebopalma & B. oudemansi do not have entire mitochondrial genomes sequenced and are thus excluded.

Bothriocroton is a relatively new genus. It was first a subgenus, described in 1994 with reference to Bothriocroton glebopalma, which had distinctive characters delineating the species from other what was then Aponomma subgenera. Nuclear rDNA analysis subsequently demonstrated that the heterogenous Aponomma genus was polyphyletic, and Bothriocroton was raised to full generic rank to accommodate a class of former "Indigenous Australian" Aponomma. Bothriocroton is a basal metastriate lineage, and the second-largest of the Haematobothrion lineages, which includes Alloceraea, Archaeocroton, Cryptocroton, Haemaphysalis and Sharifiella.

=== Species ===
Bothriocroton currently contains nine extant species:

- B. undatum Fabricius, 1775
- B. hydrosauri Denny, 1843, including former B. tachyglossi Roberts, 1953
- B. concolor Neumann, 1899
- B. glebopalma Keirans, King & Sharrad, 1994
- B. oudemansi Neumann, 1910
- B. auruginans Schulze, 1936
- B. bulli Barker, 2026
- B. dahlbergi Barker, 2026
- B. spratti Barker, 2026

An additional extinct Bothriocroton species has been proposed from Burmese amber paleobiota specimens.

- †B. muelleri Chitimia-Dobler, Mans & Dunlop, 2022

=== Etymology ===
"Bothriocroton" comes from the Greek: bothros, meaning pitted; and krótos, meaning tick. Many Bothriocroton ticks are highly punctate, particularly on the male conscutum.
