= Bothriocroton oudemansi =

Scientific classification
- Kingdom: Animalia
- Phylum: Arthropoda
- Subphylum: Chelicerata
- Class: Arachnida
- Order: Ixodida
- Family: Ixodidae
- Genus: Bothriocroton
- Species: B. oudemansi

Binomial name
- Bothriocroton oudemansi (Neumann, 1910)^{ex Zaglossus bruijnii ; Papua New Guinea}

Synonyms
- Aponomma oudemansi Neumann, 1910

New Guinean tick species

Bothriocroton oudemansi is a hard-bodied tick species endemic to New Guinea.

== Ecology ==
The species is an echidna tick, having been reported on three echidna species - Zaglossus bartoni, Zaglossus bruijni, and Tachyglossus aculeatus. Zaglossus bruijni is the type host, and the only confirmed host. B. oudemansi was previously synonymised with Bothriocroton concolor, so the veracity of older records is suspect. B. oudemansi has not been reported on the critically endangered Zaglossus attenboroughi.

Corresponding with the distribution of its host Zaglosssus, B. oudemansi has been found across the New Guinean Cordillera, in both Papua New Guinea and Indonesia. The species is known to be found in the Crater Mountain Wildlife Management Area in Eastern Highlands Province, and in Chimbu Province, where the species was most recently described.

== Description ==
Bothriocroton oudemansi, like all Bothriocroton, tend to be large, rounded ticks. It can be distinguished by the presence of its large, extruding spiracular plates. Like its former synonym B. concolor, the species has two paired files of stout dentition, but its palps are comparably more slender, and lacking the conspicuous distoventral palpal spur.

- Bothriocroton
  - - - - - Bothriocroton hydrosauri
          - Bothriocroton bulli
        - Bothriocroton dahlbergi
      - Bothriocroton undatum
    - Bothriocroton auruginans
  - - Bothriocroton concolor
    - Bothriocroton spratti

Bothriocroton species cladogram after complete mitochondrial genome phylogenies recovered in Kelava et al. (2026). B. glebopalma & B. oudemansi do not have entire mitochondrial genomes sequenced and are thus excluded.

== Etymology ==
The species is named for Dutch zoologist AC Oudemans.
