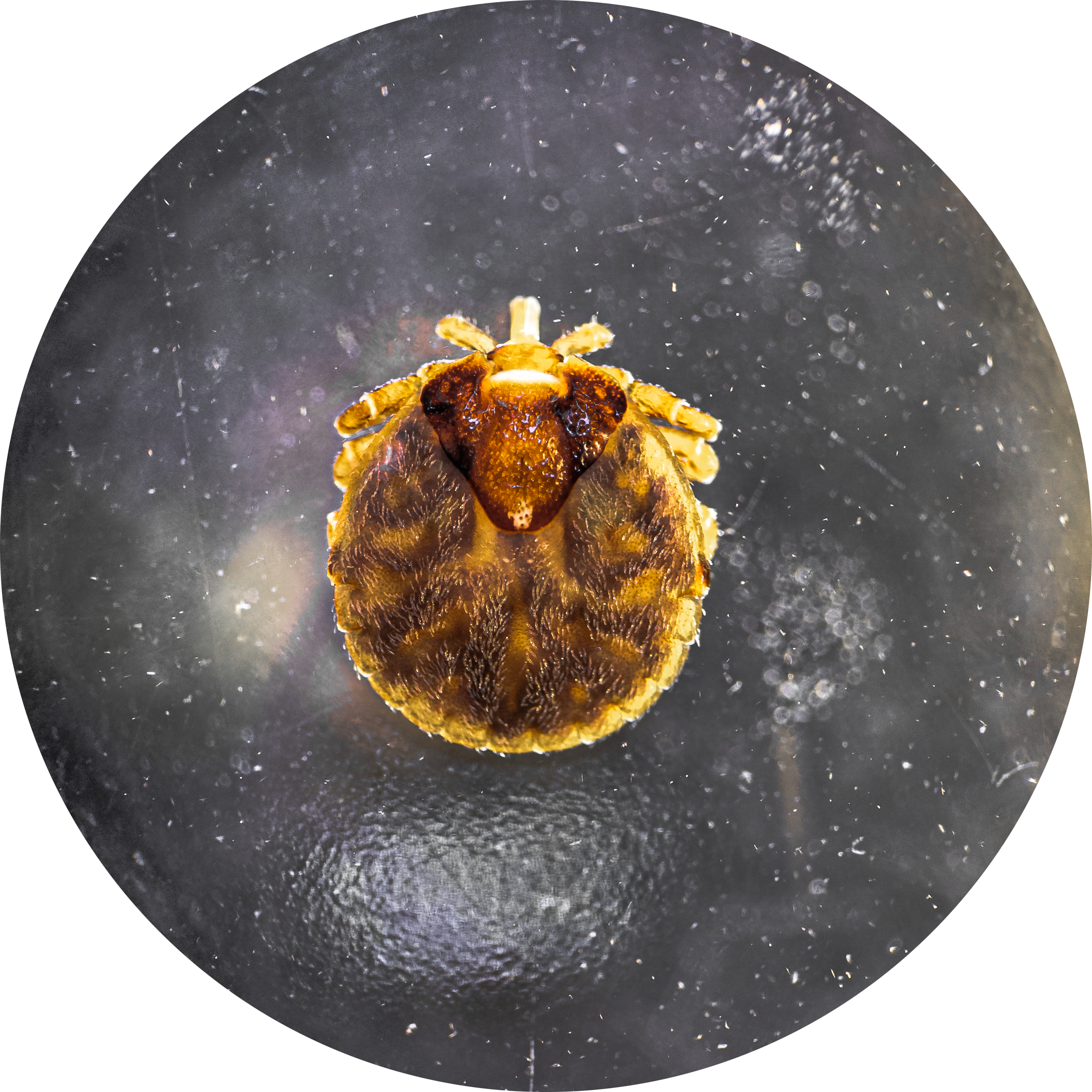
- Light micrograph of female Bothriocroton hydrosauri

Scientific classification
- Kingdom: Animalia
- Phylum: Arthropoda
- Subphylum: Chelicerata
- Class: Arachnida
- Order: Ixodida
- Family: Ixodidae
- Genus: Bothriocroton
- Species: B. hydrosauri

Binomial name
- Bothriocroton hydrosauri (Denny, 1843)^{ex Tiliqua nigrolutea, "Van Diemen's Land" (Tasmania)}

Synonyms
- Ixodes hydrosauri Denny, 1843; Ixodes trachysauri Lucas, 1861; Aponomma hydrosauri Roberts, 1953; Aponomma trachysauri Roberts, 1953; Aponomma tachyglossi Roberts, 1953; Bothriocroton tachyglossi Andrews, 2006

= Bothriocroton hydrosauri =

Australian tick species

Bothriocroton hydrosauri, commonly known as the southern reptile tick, is a hard-bodied tick species endemic to Australia.

== Ecology ==
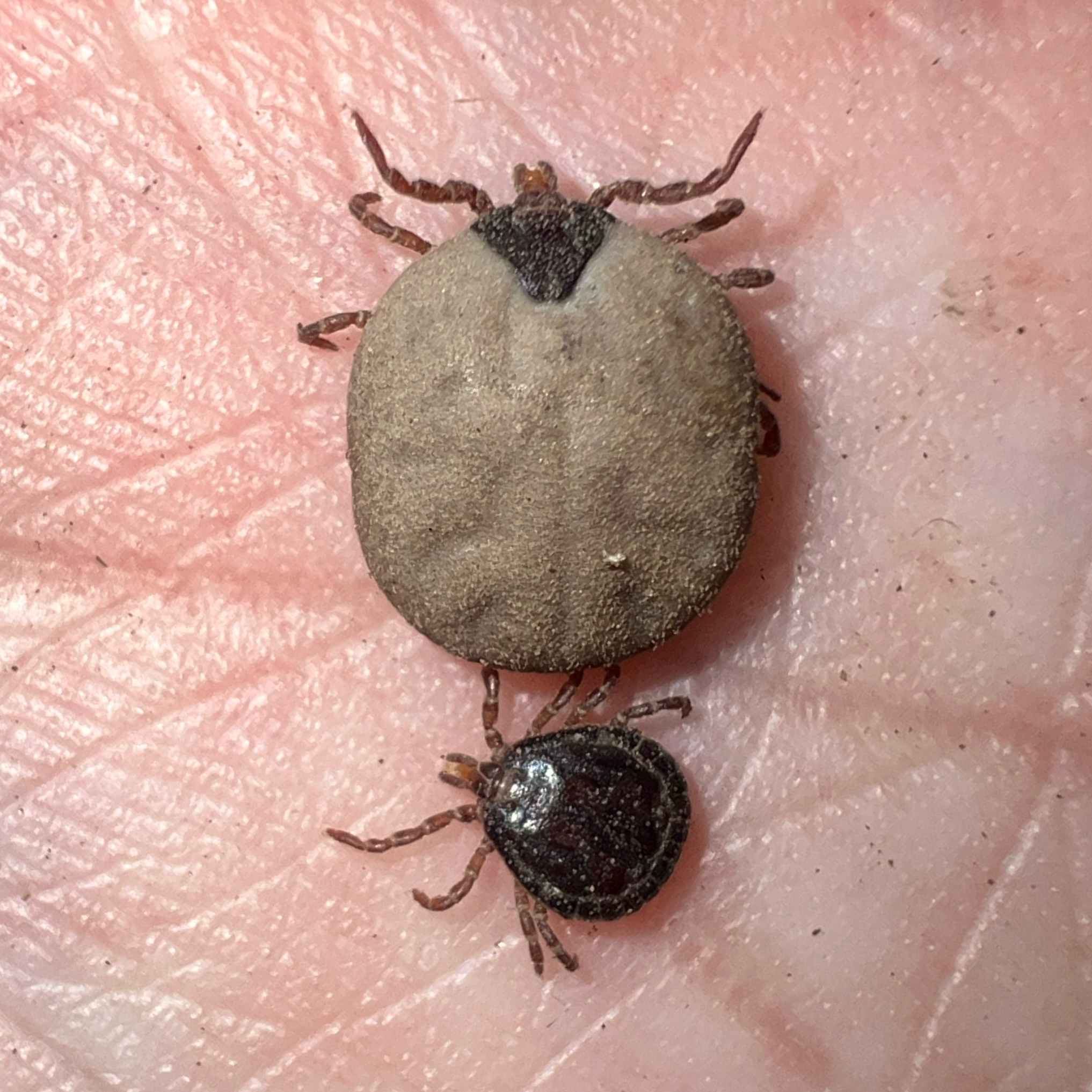
Adult female (replete, above) and male (below).

Bothriocroton hydrosauri is distributed discontinuously in eastern and southeastern Australia, with populations in Queensland (formerly B. tachyglossi), in southeastern New South Wales spanning to the Eyre Peninsula, and in Tasmania. In the southern population (NSW, Vic, Tas, SA), B. hydrosauri is a generalist reptile tick, infesting a variety of Australian lizards and snakes. The species is very commonly found on blue-tongue lizards (Tiliqua nigrolutea) and shingleback skinks (Tiliqua rugosa) in this range. In Queensland, B. hydrosauri is only found on short-beaked echidnas (Tachyglossus acleatus). Rarely, the species can parasitise humans.

B. hydrosauri is a vector of Rickettsia honei, which causes Flinders Island spotted fever. A novel thogotovirus strain has been isolated in a Tasmanian B. hydrosauri, a bacterial genus known to cause fever & neurological symptoms following human infection.

B. hydrosauri is a constitutive species of the three-tick problem of Austral ecology. The phenomenon sees the geographic distributions of three reptile ticks - Amblyomma limbatum, Bothriocroton hydrosauri and Amblyomma albolimbatum - inexplicably remaining allopatric despite their shared proximity around Bundey Bore Station, South Australia.

== Identification ==
Bothriocroton hydrosauri, like all Bothriocroton, tend to be large, rounded ticks. B. hydrosauri has paired stout dentition in triplicate (3/3), with large, circular porose areas and a characteristically pilose alloscutum in the female, and ventral plaques with moderate conscutal punctation in the male. Adult females are also characterised by the whitish enamel spot at the apex of the scutum, which is present in many specimens. Queensland Bothriocroton hydrosauri may have more pronounced dorsal cuticle indentations in the male, and more subtriangular, as opposed to circular, porose areas in the female. Queensland B. hydrosauri should not be confused with B. concolor, which lacks ventral plaques in the male, and exhibits small porose areas, wide palps and distinct ventro-medial processes on the second palpal article.

== Taxonomy ==
- Bothriocroton
  - - - - - Bothriocroton hydrosauri
          - Bothriocroton bulli
        - Bothriocroton dahlbergi
      - Bothriocroton undatum
    - Bothriocroton auruginans
  - - Bothriocroton concolor
    - Bothriocroton spratti

Bothriocroton species cladogram after complete mitochondrial genome phylogenies recovered in Kelava et al. (2026). B. glebopalma & B. oudemansi do not have entire mitochondrial genomes sequenced and are thus excluded.

Bothriocroton hydrosauri is closely related to two other Bothriocroton species.

Bothriocroton bulli circumscribes the population formerly considered as B. hydrosauri found along the southwestern Western Australia coast, from Esperance to Margaret River. The species are between 5-6% genetically distinct from one another, and exhibit reproductive isolation. The two species remain morphologically similar.

Bothriocroton dahlbergi is described from a small number of specimens discovered at Mount Molloy, Queensland, formerly identified as B. hydrosauri. The range of B. dahlbergi is unknown, and this species also shares significant visual similarity with B. hydrosauri, despite significant genetic differentiation.

The B. hydrosauri population in Queensland was formerly considered a distinct species - Bothriocroton tachyglossi, due to host preferences differences with the southern population as well as some morphological distinction. The two species are now considered synonymous, as supported by mitochondrial genome evidence.

== Etymology ==
Bothriocroton hydrosauri is named for what was thought to be its original type host. Denny mistakenly interpreted the description of the host, noted as a "Guana" (sic. "Goanna"), to mean Hydrosaurus gouldii. Varanid lizards, which the term 'goanna' usually refers to, are not present in Tasmania, the type locality. The type host was most likely Tiliqua nigrolutea, which was sometimes also referred to as a 'goanna', and is a more common host of the tick.
