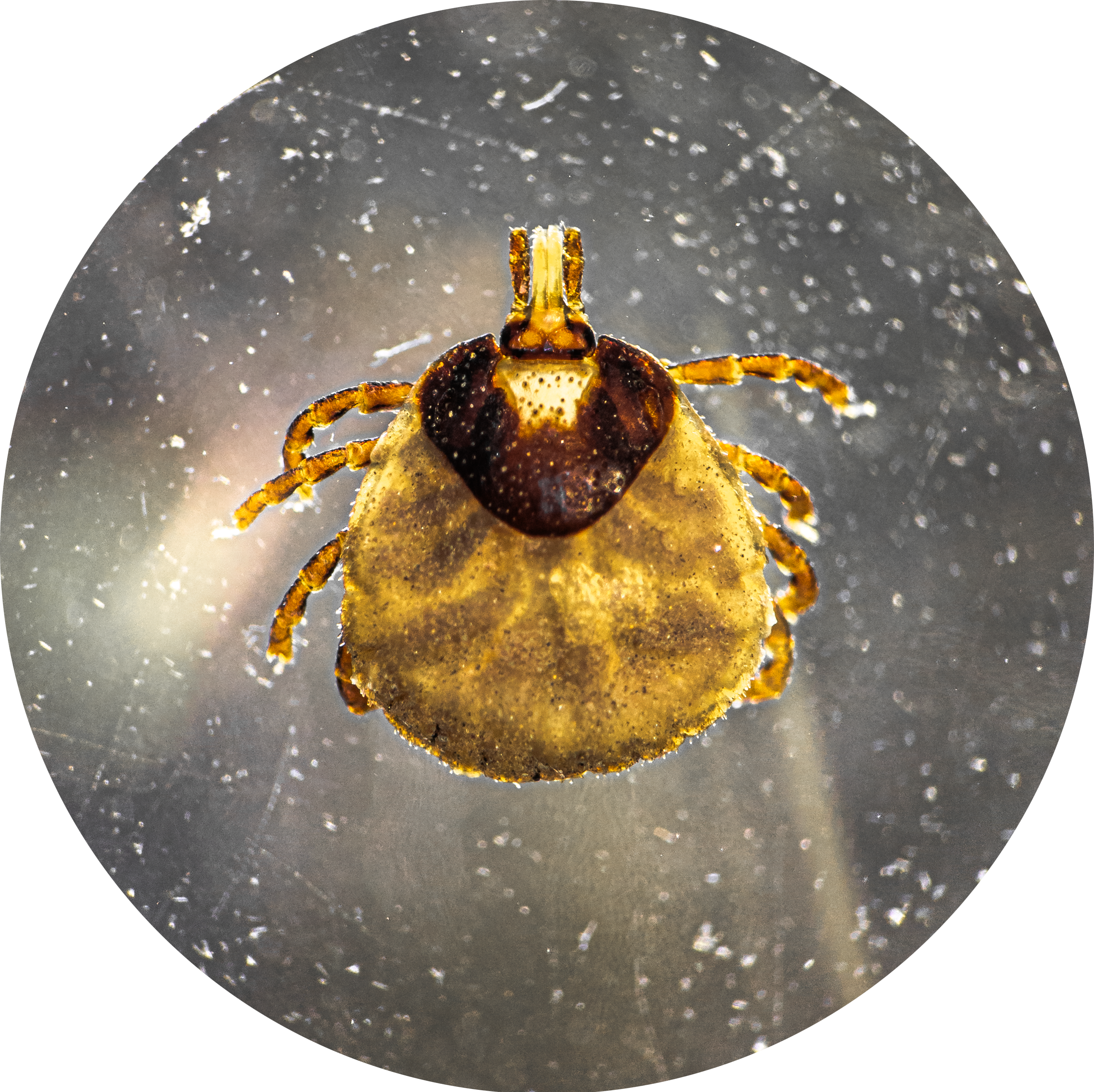
- Light micrograph of female

Scientific classification
- Kingdom: Animalia
- Phylum: Arthropoda
- Subphylum: Chelicerata
- Class: Arachnida
- Order: Ixodida
- Family: Ixodidae
- Genus: Bothriocroton
- Species: B. undatum

Binomial name
- Bothriocroton undatum (Fabricius, 1775) host unknown; "Nova Hollandia" (Australia)

Synonyms
- Acarus undatus (Fabricius, 1775); Ixodes varani (Koch, 1867); Aponomma decorosum (Neumann,1899); Aponomma undatum (Roberts, 1970)

= Bothriocroton undatum =

Australian tick species

Bothriocroton undatum, commonly known as the goanna tick, is a species of hard-bodied tick that is endemic to Australia.

Its range includes Queensland, New South Wales and Victoria. While they are sometimes found on snakes or skinks, their primary hosts are monitors and goannas, particularly Varanus varius.

== Description ==
Bothriocroton undatum, like all Bothriocroton, tend to be large, rounded ticks. That said, B. undatum is known to be among the smallest Bothriocroton. They are distinguished by their characteristic ornamentation. Females present with pale colouration between cervical grooves, whereas the male conscutum has whitish patches forming a wishbone shape, bifurcated posteriorly.

== Vector transmission ==
Bothriocroton undatum can carry Borrelia bacteria from the reptile-associated clade, related to Borrelia tachyglossi as described in Bothriocroton concolor. The degree of human or animal pathogenicity is similarly unknown.

A Rickettsia tamurae strain has also been identified in B. undatum specimens. R. tamurae from Amblyomma testudinarium has been reported to be able to infect humans, causing skin inflammation. B. undatum, however, has no history of human infection.

- Bothriocroton
  - - - - - Bothriocroton hydrosauri
          - Bothriocroton bulli
        - Bothriocroton dahlbergi
      - Bothriocroton undatum
    - Bothriocroton auruginans
  - - Bothriocroton concolor
    - Bothriocroton spratti

Bothriocroton species cladogram after complete mitochondrial genome phylogenies recovered in Kelava et al. (2026). B. glebopalma & B. oudemansi do not have entire mitochondrial genomes sequenced and are thus excluded.
