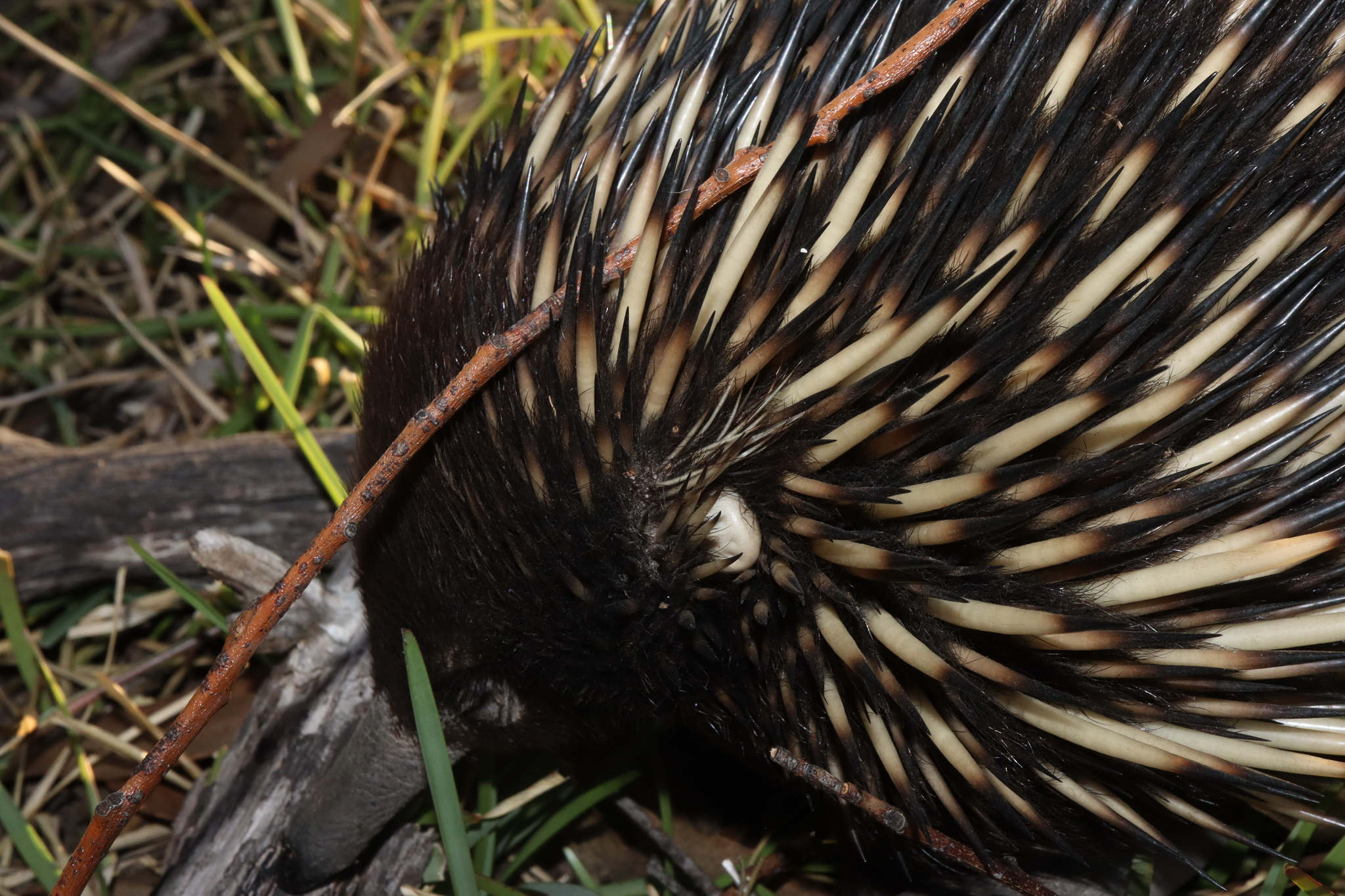
- An echidna tick, likely a Bothriocroton spratti.

Scientific classification
- Kingdom: Animalia
- Phylum: Arthropoda
- Subphylum: Chelicerata
- Class: Arachnida
- Order: Ixodida
- Family: Ixodidae
- Genus: Bothriocroton
- Species: B. spratti

Binomial name
- Bothriocroton spratti Barker, 2026

= Bothriocroton spratti =

Australian tick species

Bothriocroton spratti is a hard-bodied tick species endemic to Australia.

== Ecology and distribution ==
Bothriocroton spratti is commonly found on echidnas across southern New South Wales, Victoria, Tasmania and eastern South Australia. B. spratti has strict host specificity to echidnas, specifically the short-beaked echidna, Tachyglossus aculeatus. The exception is on Kangaroo Island, where B. spratti can be found on Macropus fuliginosus ssp. fuliginosus, the Kangaroo Island subspecies of the Western grey kangaroo. The species is the most common tick of echidnas in southern Australia. Other tick species that feed on echidnas include Amblyomma echidnae, Amblyomma australiense, Amblyomma moyi and Ixodes barkeri, but all of these are uncommon. B. concolor is common on echidnas in Queensland.

== Description ==
Bothriocroton spratti, like all Bothriocroton, tend to be large, rounded ticks. Like B. concolor, the species is exhibits a distinct pointed spur projecting medially from distoventral palpal segment II. Females often have pale colouring to the medial scutal aspect, and large bilateral punctations on the posterior of the lateral scutal aspects. In both sexes, the palps are more broad, dorsally, than in other Bothriocroton. B. spratti cervical grooves are shorter and more sharply angled than B. concolor, resulting in a more elliptical intercervical area.

== Taxonomy ==
- Bothriocroton
  - - - - - Bothriocroton hydrosauri
          - Bothriocroton bulli
        - Bothriocroton dahlbergi
      - Bothriocroton undatum
    - Bothriocroton auruginans
  - - Bothriocroton concolor
    - Bothriocroton spratti

Bothriocroton species cladogram after complete mitochondrial genome phylogenies recovered in Kelava et al. (2026). B. glebopalma & B. oudemansi do not have entire mitochondrial genomes sequenced and are thus excluded.

Bothriocroton spratti is closely related to Bothriocroton concolor, being only recently distinguished from the latter. The two species are very challenging to distinguish visually, and the margin of geographic delineation is not clear. B. spratti is found in southern NSW, Victoria, Tasmania and South Australia, whereas B. concolor is known from Queensland and northern NSW.

== Etymology ==
The species is named for Dr. David Spratt, an Australian-Canadian parasitologist.
