= Amblyomma albolimbatum =

Scientific classification
- Kingdom: Animalia
- Phylum: Arthropoda
- Subphylum: Chelicerata
- Class: Arachnida
- Order: Ixodida
- Family: Ixodidae
- Genus: Amblyomma
- Species: A. albolimbatum

Binomial name
- Amblyomma albolimbatum Neumann, 1907

Species of tick

Amblyomma albolimbatum is a species of tick. It is also known as the stumptailed lizard tick. It feeds on lizards, in particular skinks, but also snakes. It is endemic to Australia.
