= Bothriocroton dahlbergi =

- Female Bothriocroton dahlbergi

Scientific classification
- Kingdom: Animalia
- Phylum: Arthropoda
- Subphylum: Chelicerata
- Class: Arachnida
- Order: Ixodida
- Family: Ixodidae
- Genus: Bothriocroton
- Species: B. dahlbergi

Binomial name
- Bothriocroton dahlbergi Barker, 2026

Australian tick species

Bothriocroton dahlbergi is a hard-bodied tick species endemic to Far North Queensland, Australia.

== Ecology and distribution ==
Bothriocroton dahlbergi is known from the short-beaked echidna (Tachyglossus aculeatus) in the Atherton Tableland, Far North Queensland, with the only confirmed specimens being found at Mount Molloy. The species' estimated distribution spans from north of Townsville to Cape York.

== Description and identification ==
Bothriocroton dahlbergi strongly resembles B. hydrosauri. Much like B. hydrosauri, female B. dahlbergi are large, dark ticks, with pilose dorsal alloscuta. The males of the species are only provisionally known, as none have been genotyped. B. dahlbergi lack the lateral scutal depressions of confluencing punctations of B. hydrosauri and exhibit shallower cervical grooves. The dental formula of recognised specimens is 4/4 stout, compared to 3/3 stout most common to B. hydrosauri.

== Taxonomy ==
- Bothriocroton
  - - - - - Bothriocroton hydrosauri
          - Bothriocroton bulli
        - Bothriocroton dahlbergi
      - Bothriocroton undatum
    - Bothriocroton auruginans
  - - Bothriocroton concolor
    - Bothriocroton spratti

Bothriocroton species cladogram after complete mitochondrial genome phylogenies recovered in Kelava et al. (2026). B. glebopalma & B. oudemansi do not have entire mitochondrial genomes sequenced and are thus excluded.

Bothriocroton dahlbergi are morphologically similar to Bothriocroton hydrosauri, but quite genetically disparate, being the most remote of the hydrosauri species group.

== Etymology ==
The species is named for Amber Dahlberg, a Queensland wildlife carer who collected the elusive holotype and paratypes.
