= Bothriocroton bulli =

- Male Bothriocroton bulli

Scientific classification
- Kingdom: Animalia
- Phylum: Arthropoda
- Subphylum: Chelicerata
- Class: Arachnida
- Order: Ixodida
- Family: Ixodidae
- Genus: Bothriocroton
- Species: B. bulli

Binomial name
- Bothriocroton bulli Barker, 2026

Australian tick species

Bothriocroton bulli is a hard-bodied tick species endemic to Australia.

== Ecology and distribution ==
Bothriocroton bulli is known from Tiliqua rugosa along the southwestern Western Australia coast, from Esperance to Margaret River.

== Description ==
Bothriocroton bulli, like all Bothriocroton, tend to be large, rounded ticks. Much like B. hydrosauri, female B. bulli are large, dark, circular ticks, with highly pilose dorsal alloscuta, often with a conspicuous spot of enamel at the scutal apex. Males are typically smaller than females, with posterior conscutal indentation and ventral plaques. Compared to B. hydrosauri, B. bulli males exhibit lateral grooves that continue onto the scapulae, which themselves are wide, making the overall body profile more circular than pyriform hydrosauri males. Female cervical grooves in B. bulli are distinctly wider than in B. hydrosauri.

== Taxonomy ==
- Bothriocroton
  - - - - - Bothriocroton hydrosauri
          - Bothriocroton bulli
        - Bothriocroton dahlbergi
      - Bothriocroton undatum
    - Bothriocroton auruginans
  - - Bothriocroton concolor
    - Bothriocroton spratti

Bothriocroton species cladogram after complete mitochondrial genome phylogenies recovered in Kelava et al. (2026). B. glebopalma & B. oudemansi do not have entire mitochondrial genomes sequenced and are thus excluded.

Bothriocroton bulli is closely related to Bothriocroton hydrosauri, being only recently distinguished from the latter. The two species are separated by the Nullarbor Plain, and exhibit reproductive isolation, consistent with the 5-6% genetic distance between them.

== Etymology ==
The species is named for the late Professor Michael Bull, an Australian ecologist who conducted significant research on the species.
