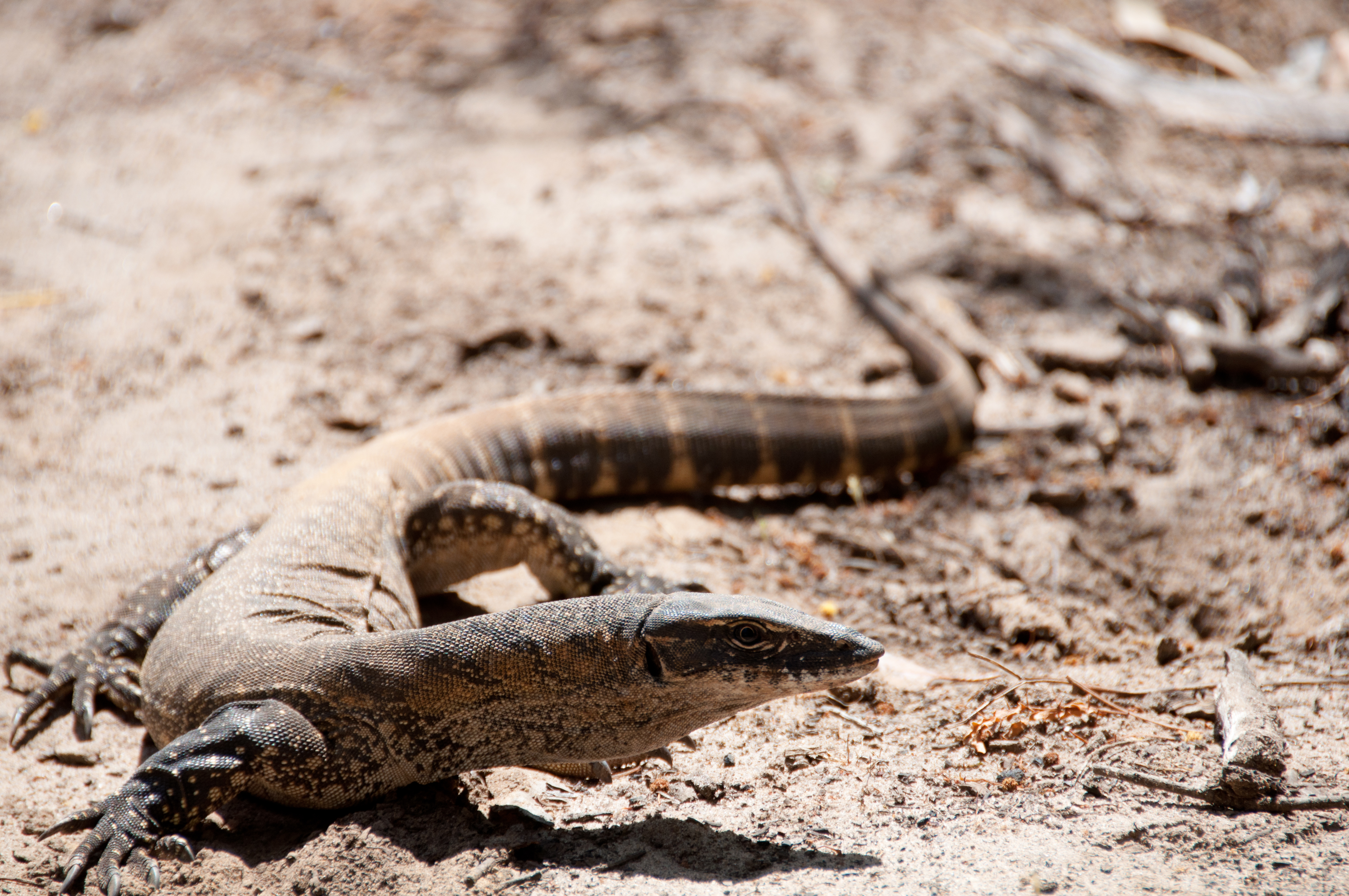

Conservation status
- Least Concern (IUCN 3.1)

Scientific classification
- Kingdom: Animalia
- Phylum: Chordata
- Class: Reptilia
- Order: Squamata
- Suborder: Anguimorpha
- Family: Varanidae
- Genus: Varanus
- Subgenus: Varanus
- Species: V. rosenbergi

Binomial name
- Varanus rosenbergi Mertens, 1957
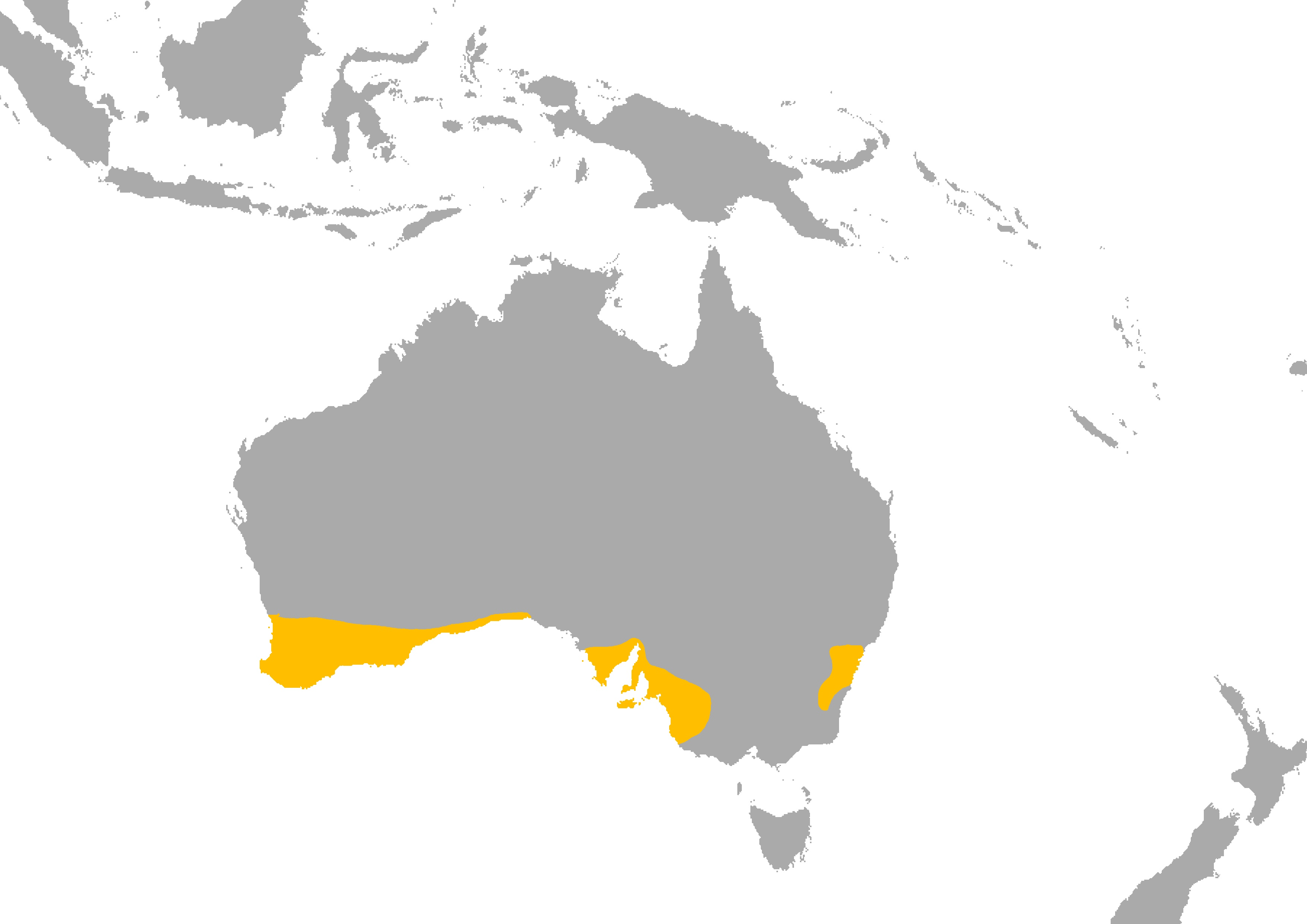

= Rosenberg's monitor =

Species of lizard

The Rosenberg's monitor (Varanus rosenbergi) is an Australian species of varanid reptile found in southern regions of the continent. They are large and fast predators with rugged bodies and long tails, having a combined length up to 1.5 metres, that will consume any smaller animal that is pursued and captured or found while foraging. They occur in the Australian Capital Territory, New South Wales, South Australia, Victoria, where it may be rare or locally common, and more frequently observed in Western Australia, where it is sometimes abundant.

== Taxonomy ==
The species was first described by German herpetologist Robert Mertens in 1957, named and recognized as a subspecies of Varanus gouldii; a revision of Western Australian monitors published in 1980 elevated the taxon to species status. It is now considered to be a member of the V. gouldii species complex. The holotype was collected at the Stirling Range in Southwest Australia. The specific name, rosenbergi, is in honor of German naturalist Hermann von Rosenberg.

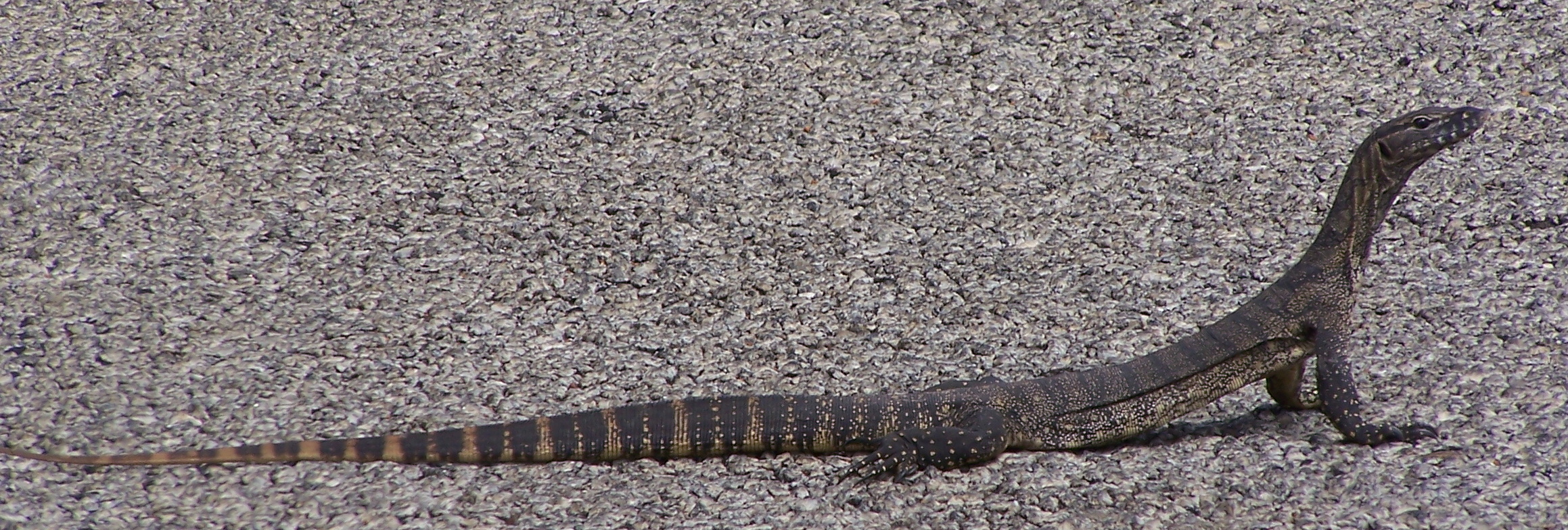
Individual from the holotype locality, Western Australia, Stirling Range

The infrageneric classification of the species allies it to other taxa of the subgenus Varanus (Varanus). A geographically remote population in the eastern states has distinct characteristics that may represent a cryptic species. A description published as Pantherosaurus kuringai in 1985 is regarded as a synonym for this species.

The common names include the heath monitor or the southern heath monitor, along with those names that are a legacy of their description as the sand goanna Varanus gouldii.

== Description ==
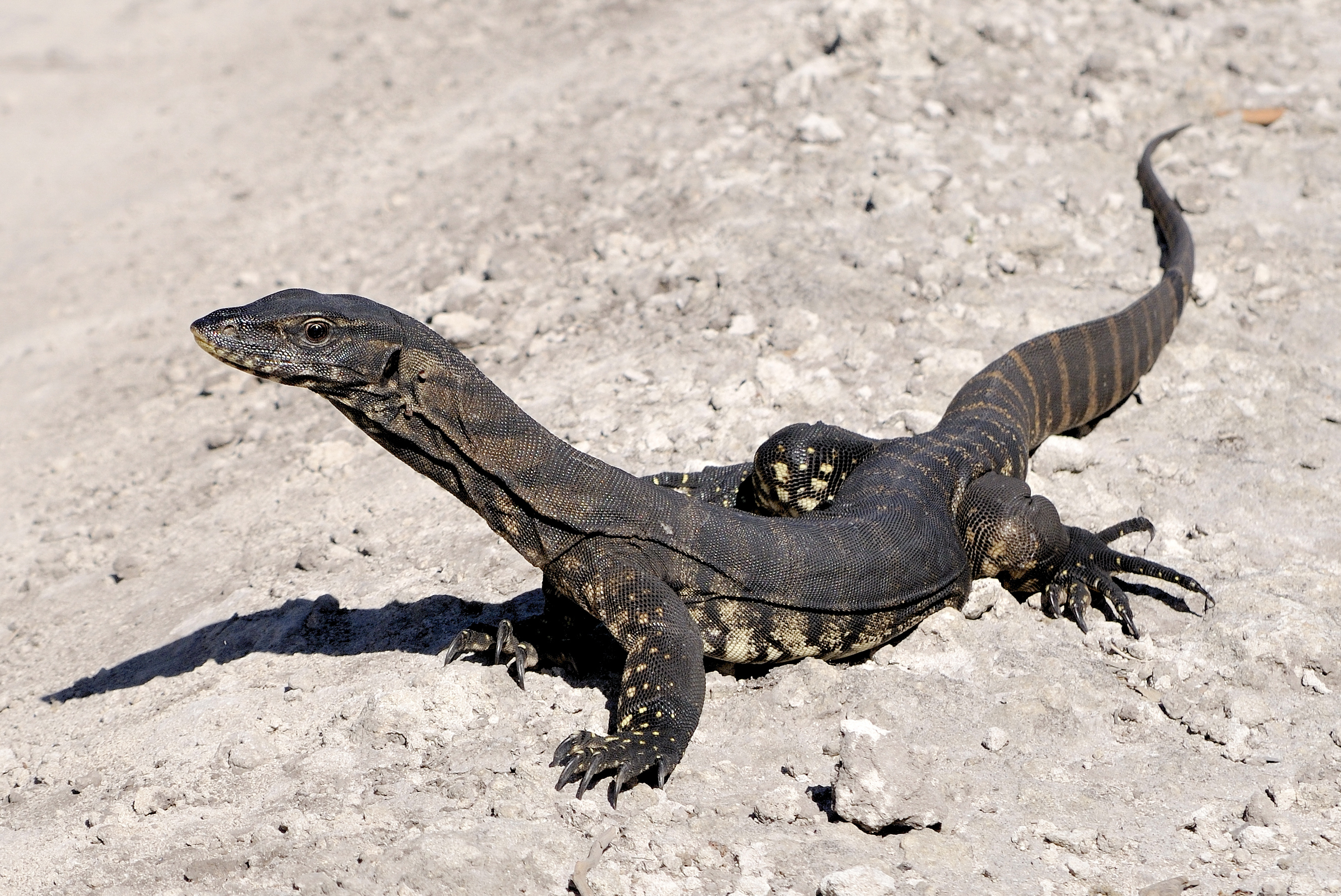
Dark coloured individual, south-western coast of Western Australia

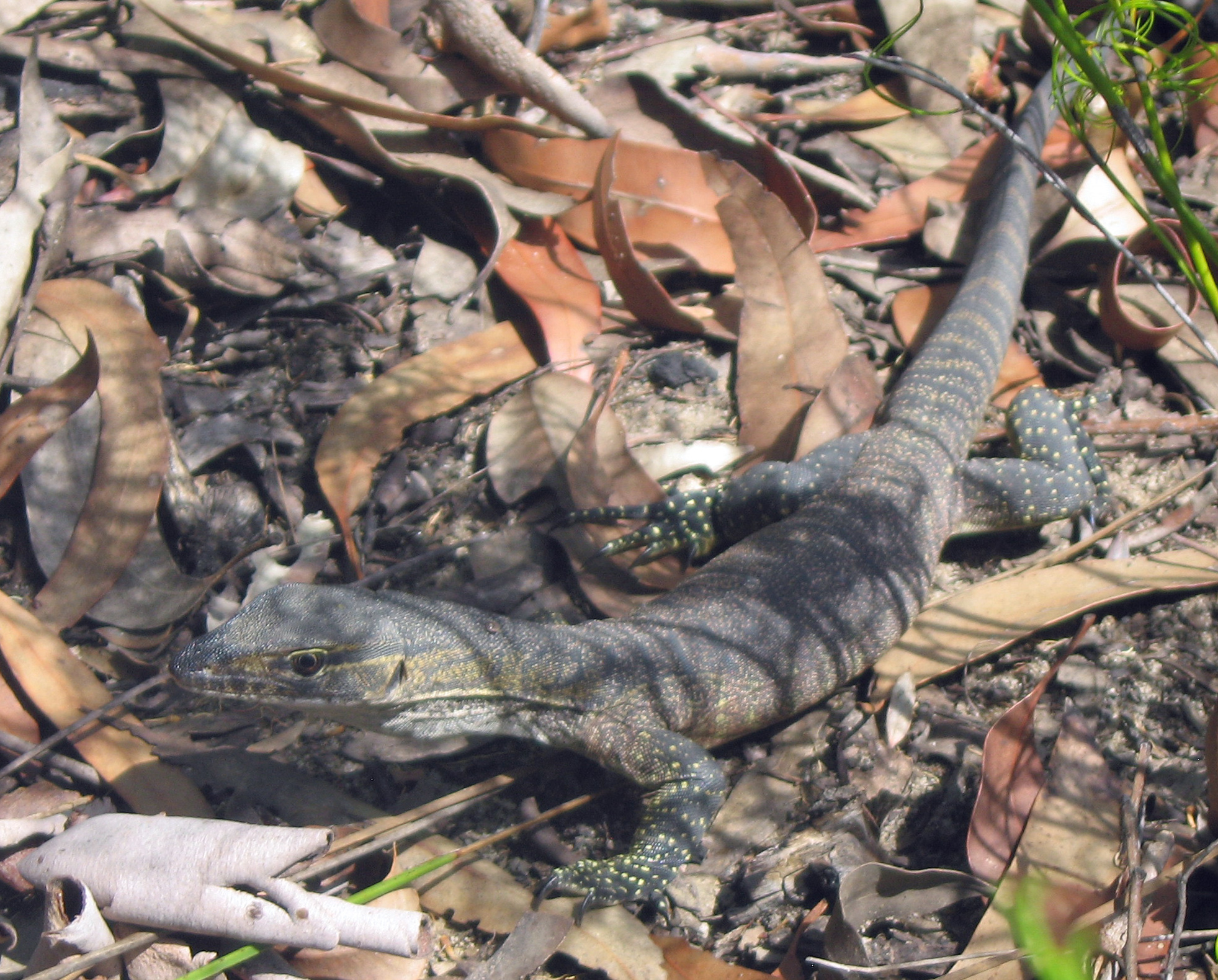
Juvenile

Like most other monitor lizards, these are fast-moving predators with long tails, stout limbs and clawed feet. They resemble the closely related and widespread sand goanna (Varanus gouldii), to which they were previously allied as a subspecies, but distinguished by darker coloration overall, especially the markings at the tail tip and underside and the distinct black banding at the back and neck. Dull and vaguely defined yellow stripes appear across most of the tail's length, sometimes interrupting the blackish colour of its end. The feet and limbs are also very dark, and spotted with a creamy or brownish colour. The dark tone at the head is marked with yellow dots above the mouth, and the yellowish cream background colour of the underside displays a blackish reticular pattern.

The largest specimens are those found at Kangaroo Island, near the coast of South Australia, these are also darker than those on the mainland and possess a greater number of scale rows at the ventral side. Fat layers in Rosenberg's monitor constitute around 7.6% of body weight, allowing energy reserves to be stored throughout the body and tail. This monitor can reach a length of 1.5 metres. It is dark gray with yellow and white spotting and black bands on its body and all the way down the tail. The juvenile is tinged with orange.

The comparative ratio of head and body lengths between the sexes, often evident in the monitor subgenus Odatria, is not easily discernible in this species and their subgenus Varanus.

== Behaviour ==
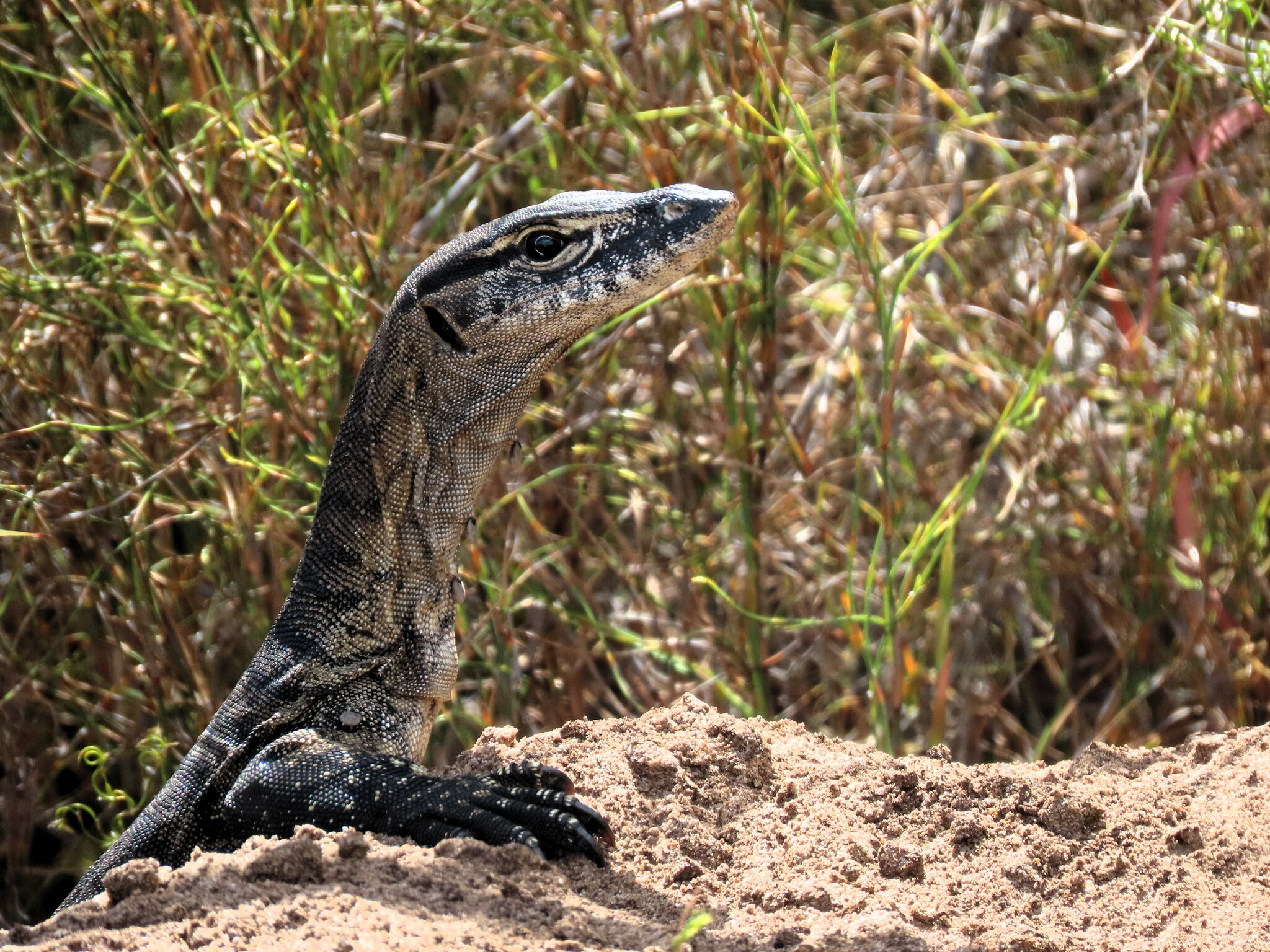
Western Australia

They are highly active carnivores, able to pursue large prey, and opportunistic generalists whose diet includes birds, reptiles, mammals, eggs, and carrion. Analysis of the island population in South Australia revealed that the majority of their diet is reptiles and mammals, with a third of their diet being invertebrates, primarily species of acridid grasshoppers, areneid sea snails, blattoid cockroaches and beetles. Some amphibians, mostly Limnodynastes frogs, and a small proportion of birds were also found to have been captured and consumed, but invertebrates would be found during its regular foraging activities through soft soils and detritus. This goanna has been observed eating road kill, including possums and wallabies, and consumption of these may account for a significant proportion of the mammal component of their diet. The native Australian bush rat is likely pursued and caught, but the records of consumption of the western grey kangaroo and brush-tail possum is likely the discovery of their carcasses.

Water is obtained from prey when seasonal rainfall is low, and supplemented by drinking free water when available. Living in a sometimes saline environment, they are able to expel excess salts—primarily sodium chloride and a smaller amount of potassium—through gland structures at the nostrils. In winter months the water required by the goanna may be supplemented from free water or by pulmocutaneous exchange of moisture.

The darker coloration of Rosenberg's monitor, a form of melanism, allows a greater degree of thermoregulation of their body in the cooler southern climates. They periodically bask in the sun throughout the day, or when the opportunity arises, laying in the soil if it is warm or clambering on to branches to avoid a net heat loss; heath monitors are mostly found in their burrows during the coldest parts of the year. Females may continue to be active at night, maintaining a body temperature 20 °C greater than the ambient temperature.

Rosenberg's monitor conserves its energy requirements during cooler seasons of the year, entering a state of torpor, but demonstrates the ability to voluntarily arouse itself during these periods.

The species will climb a tree to evade capture.

== Reproduction ==
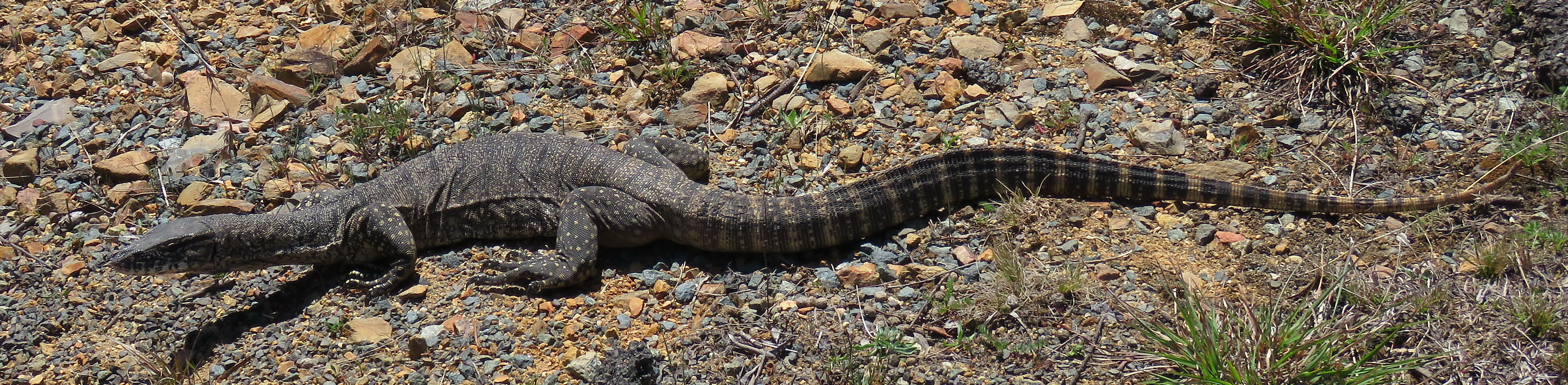
Namadgi National Park, ACT.

As a large amount of energy is expended in the production of and defence of eggs, females often (though not always) have a 1-2 year break between egg clutches. Males on the other hand usually mate every year.

Reproductive behaviour, including guarding of nest sites, occurs during the summer over a four-month period of a sexually active adult's year, beginning before the December solstice and ending after the March equinox.

=== Courtship ===
Rosenberg’s monitor displays unusual reproductive behaviours in comparison to other monitor species, forming pairs that often remain monogamous throughout the breeding season, or even beyond; male and female pairs are sometimes found in the same burrows during winter, although pairs break up before the following breeding season. In lace and rock monitors, scent marking was only observed in males. Female Rosenberg’s monitors in comparison play a more active role in courtship. In December, potentially breeding members of both sexes begin making broad, deep, serpentine furrows in the ground termed “squidge marks”. “Squidging” is done by pressing the body to the ground and moving diagonally. Squidge marks are often within a 20 metre radius of termite mounds, although they may also be found on trails.

Males compete mainly through posturing — the body and gular pouch inflates, the back arches, and legs extend in an aggressive pose, circling each other until one male either walks away or is chased off. On rare occasions, physical fighting may occur, which includes wrestling and biting. Fights may last up over 40 minutes, and only occur prior to pairs having been established.

Males upon finding a female’s burrow will often occupy a separate burrow a few metres apart from her own. A male would invite her out of her burrow by entering his head into the burrow before retreating. He then circles her, flicking his tongue, until she initiates physical contact by touching him with her head. Within days, he moves into her burrow, which is then enlarged. The pair stays in close proximity of each other for several days, often basking together with the male’s front and hind legs resting across the female’s back.

=== Mating ===
Within 2–7 days of pairing up, copulation begins. The pair copulate several times daily for a period of 7–17 days. The male emerges to bask first, before re-entering the burrow, kicking up dirt as he does. Shortly after, he backs out of the burrow followed by the female. He licks and pecks her head and groin, rubs his head along her back and sides, and strokes her head and front legs with his own front legs. Copulation then begins with insertion of one of the male’s two hemipenes followed by 10–15 minutes of pelvic thrusts. Afterwards, the male continues basking; the female either returns to the burrow or basks with him.

Males will usually defend females and their burrows from other males, aggressively chasing off intruders; if the female is left unattended, she will frequently copulate with up to two other males. Males will similarly sometimes mate with up to three other females. While females do not act aggressively against courting males, copulation only occurs if she is receptive, as she will lie flat to the ground such that copulation can only occur if she lifts her tail and rotates her cloaca to one side. The side to which she rotates her cloaca dictates which of the male's hemipenes can be inserted, and she alternates the side she rotates it to with each copulation. Sometimes however, females will have two (or very rarely three) male partners that do not conflict with each other. Depending on the year, 40-80% of mated pairs remain exclusively monogamous throughout the breeding season.

=== Egg laying ===
While males will continue to forage for food, females do not before egg laying. On one occasion however, a pair was seen feeding on a wallaby carcass that the male had dragged to the burrow.

A week before egg laying, females will begin circling and scratching at termite mounds near the burrow, even at night in the dark. Rosenberg’s monitors only lay their eggs in the mounds of Nasutitermes exitiosis (a species also utilized by lace monitors). The use of termitaria provides the hatchlings favourable conditions as termite nests regulate warmth and humidity, offering an internal temperature of 30 °C for most of the year, and do not fall below 20 °C at the coolest times of the year.

It takes two days to excavate an egg chamber in a termite mound before laying a clutch of 10-14 eggs. Infertile clutches of 6-7 eggs have been recorded from older females. The entrance to egg chamber is then plugged up by termites in 3–5 hours; the female returns the following morning and backfills the entrance herself if the hole was not completely plugged. She then defends her clutch from predators that might eat her eggs, including male Rosenberg’s monitors that she had not mated with even if they are twice her weight. While fights against conspecifics are not fatal, they often result in dislocated or broken legs, broken ribs, spine injuries, and severe bite wounds to the head, throat, and body. Although uncommon, defending females are occasionally defeated by conspecifics, and her eggs then eaten. On a few occasions, males assisted females with the excavation and backfilling of the egg chamber.

The incubation period of Rosenberg's monitor eggs is around seven months or longer on Kangaroo Island, which is regarded as an extended period when compared to other squamates and may be a response to the cooler climate of its range. In September and October, the hatchlings emerge from the mound, possibly with digging assistance from the adult; this parenting behaviour has inferred from the habits of other monitors without being directly observed in Rosenberg's monitor. A study observing this species at Kangaroo Island found that hatchlings emerged at the point of the parents entry to the nest, and able to excavate themselves from their birthplace. Their emergence corresponds with increasing warmth of the temperature outside the termitaria, and the hatchlings are observed at basking in the sunshine at the exterior and reoccupying the nest site during cold nights.

== Distribution ==
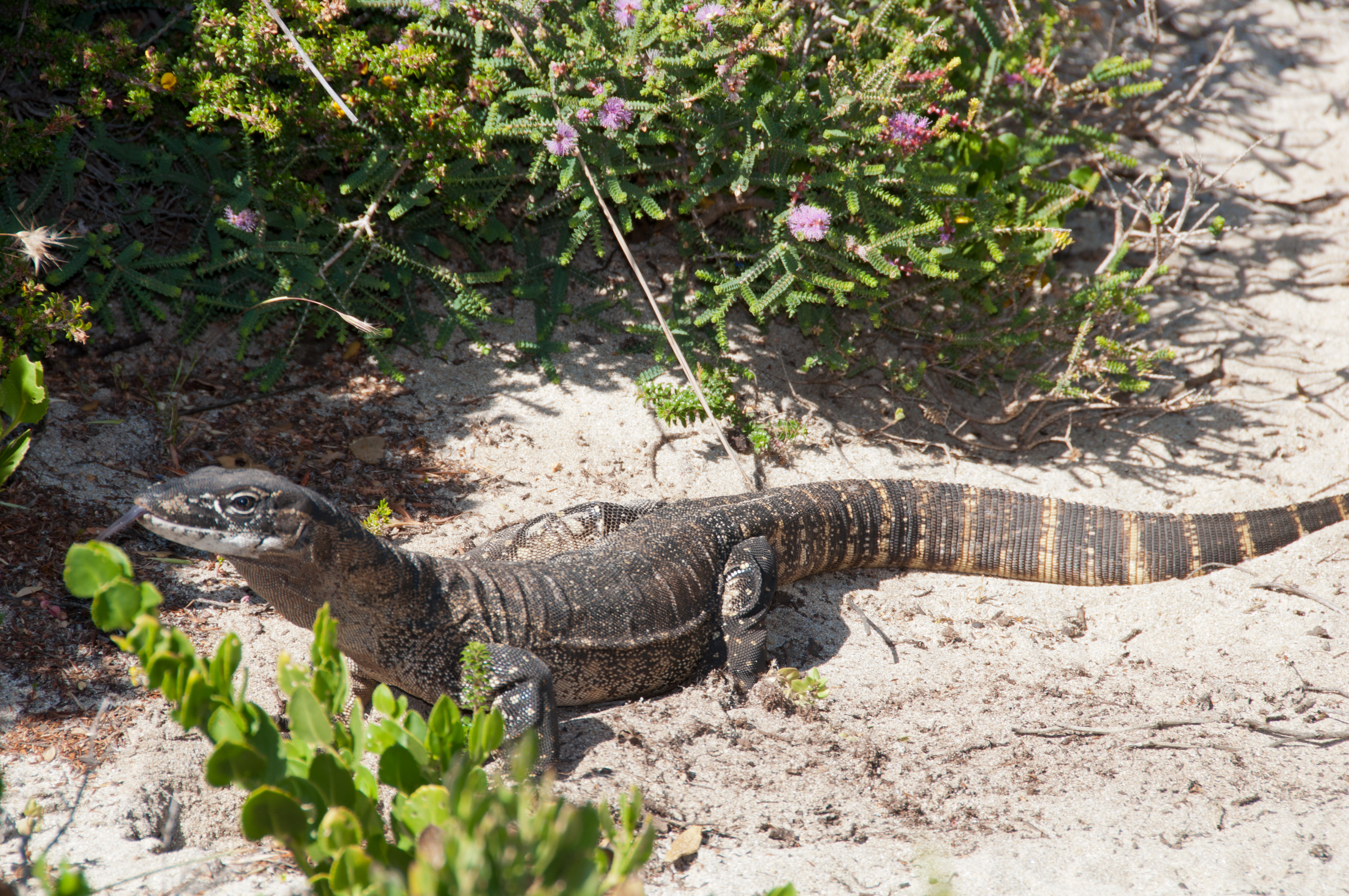
South Australia, Kangaroo Island

The distribution range of the species is in the south of the Australian continent, all occurrences are recorded below the southern 30° line of latitude. The range in Southwest Australia is south of Mussel Pool, to the northeast of the state's capital Perth, and inland from the southern coast in a range that extends close to Bendering, Norseman, Balladonia and then east to Eucla and South Australia. Rosenberg's monitor is most common in the west, locally abundant in favourable habitat, and deeply fragmented in the east; isolated groups near Canberra and Sydney may represent a separate species. A subpopulation, with individuals somewhat larger in size, is found on Kangaroo Island, and a mainland population in South Australia is considered rare. The eastern states included in records of the species occurrence at New South Wales, the Australian Capital Territory and Victoria.

The heath monitor is found in habitat close to sea level and at elevations below 1500 metres asl. The population in New South Wales, isolated and suspected to be a sister species, is found at a range of elevations, including occurrences above the snow-line in the mountainous regions of eastern Australia. The individual range of Rosenberg's monitor is comparatively large.

The distribution range overlaps with sand goannas (Varanus gouldii) and individuals of these species are sometimes sympatric, especially at southern areas of the Western Australian wheatbelt and on the Swan Coastal Plain; the species do not hybridize. The named distribution range of the widespread population of V. gouldi, due to a historically uncertain taxonomic description, was revised to exclude the southern coastal areas were this species occurs.

== Ecology ==
The favoured types of habitat Rosenberg's monitor is associated with plant communities are most often sandy heathland, open woodland or sclerophyll forest, although the species is known to occur in other vegetation types. The near coastal areas it inhabits are frequently saline environments. Subalpine environments in the southernmost parts of its range such as Naas Valley, ACT, sometimes encounters snowfall. Heath monitors excavate burrows for refuge, or occupy rocky fissures and hollow trees.

=== Parasites ===
Rosenberg's monitor is known to be host to nine species of intestinal nematodes, parasites known as roundworm, and is recorded near undisturbed habitat with high infection rates of Abbreviata nematodes. Individuals often carry blood-feeding ticks lodged to their skin, these are found around the cloaca or base of the tail or seeking areas of high blood flow at the head and neck by the female tick when pregnant. The infestation rate in the southwest region is around half of the adults and is absent in juveniles, the Kangaroo Island population has a higher rate, around 85% of those surveyed carrying Aponomma fimbriatum ticks.

== Conservation ==
Rosenberg's monitor was once widespread across much of the southern parts of Australia. While listed as Least Concern by the IUCN, it has since disappeared from much of its natural range on the mainland. In recent years, the population on Kangaroo Island has declined as a result of habitat loss due to altered land use, increasing road traffic, and increasing predation by feral cats and pigs.

Gallery

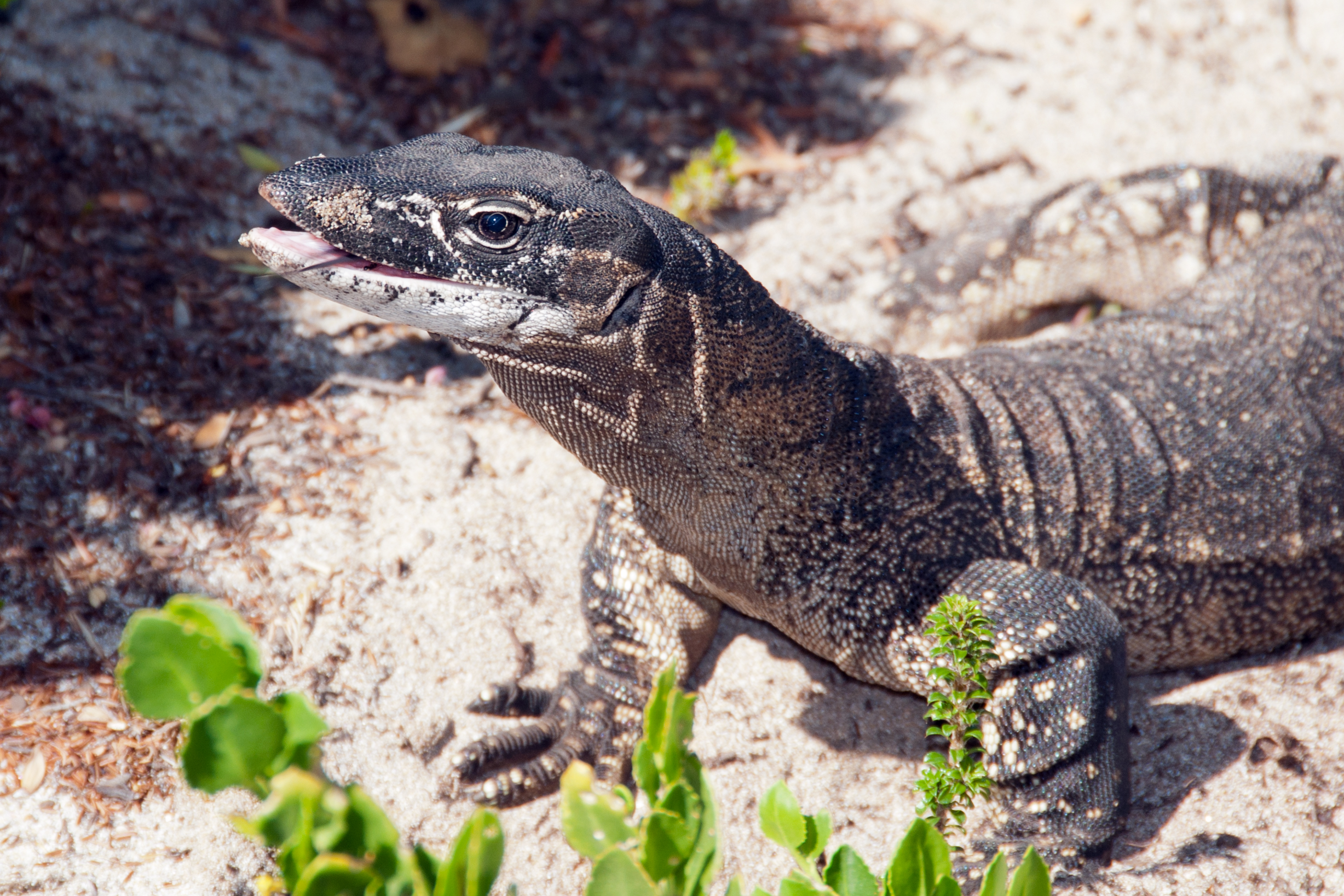
South Australia, Kangaroo Island

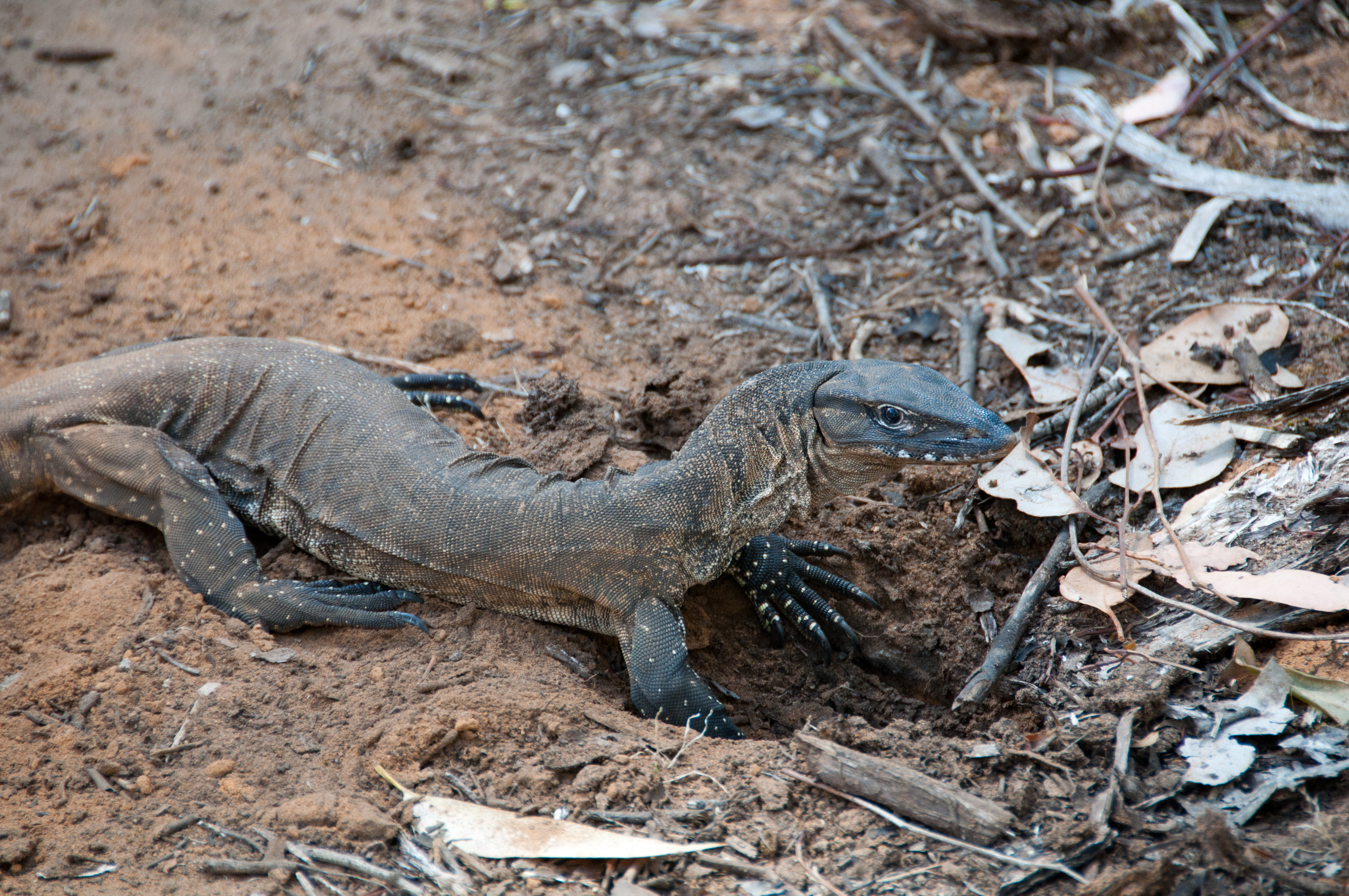
South Australia, Kangaroo Island

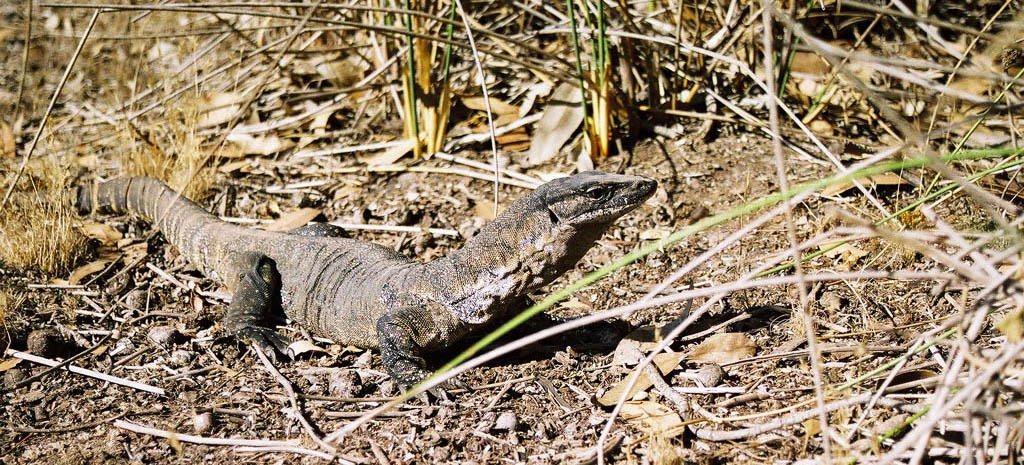
South Australia, Kangaroo Island

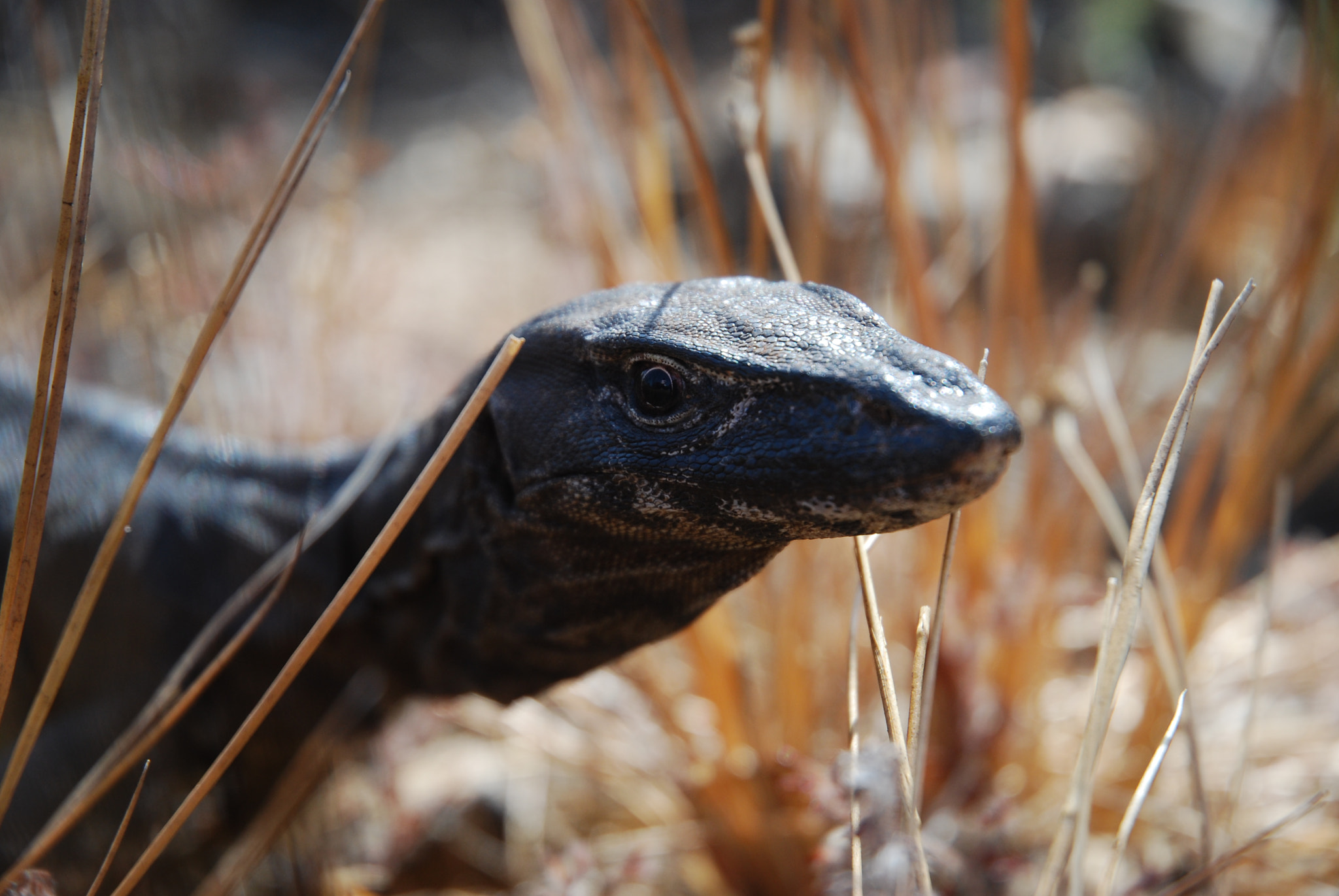
Western Australia

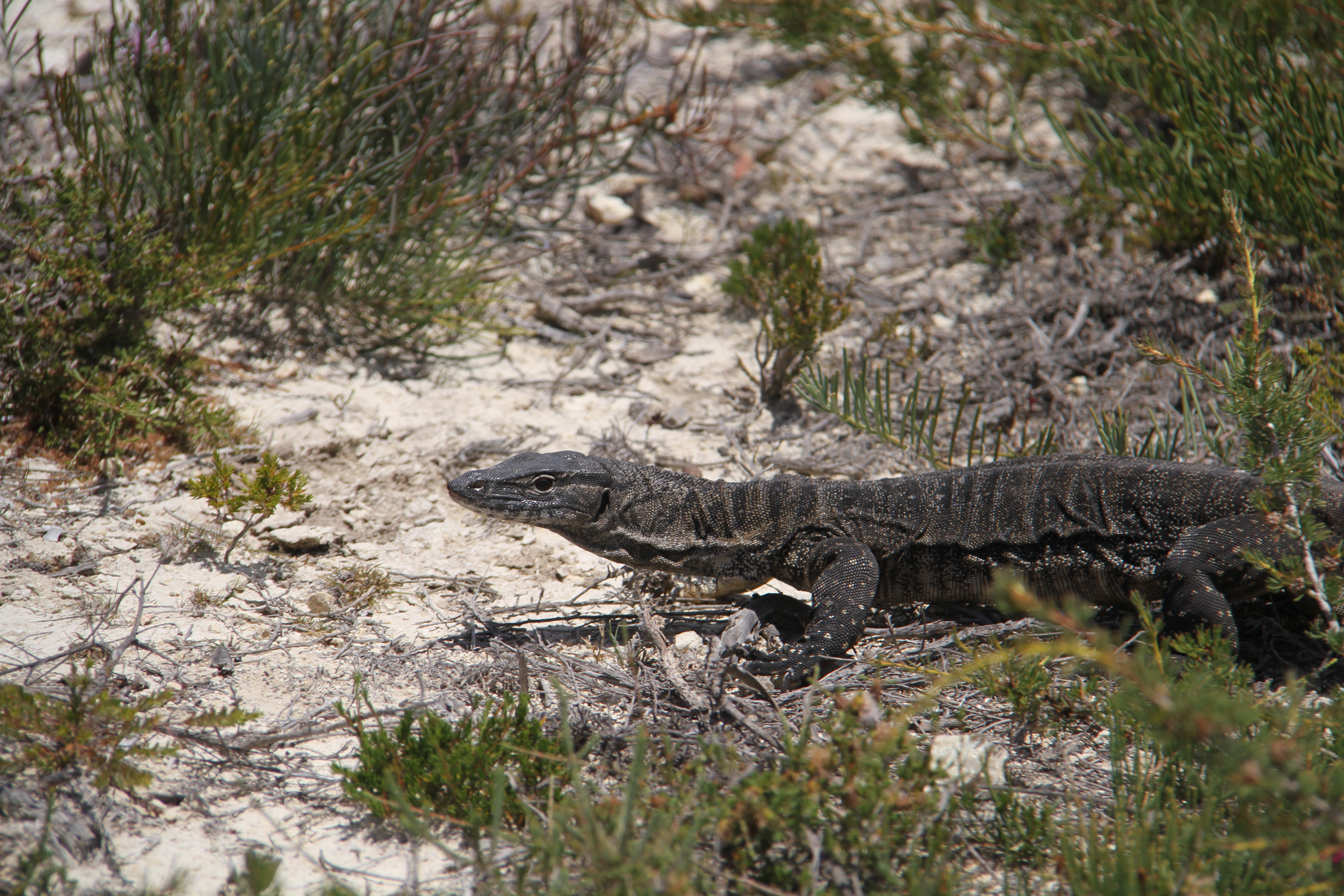
Western Australia, Cape Arid National Park

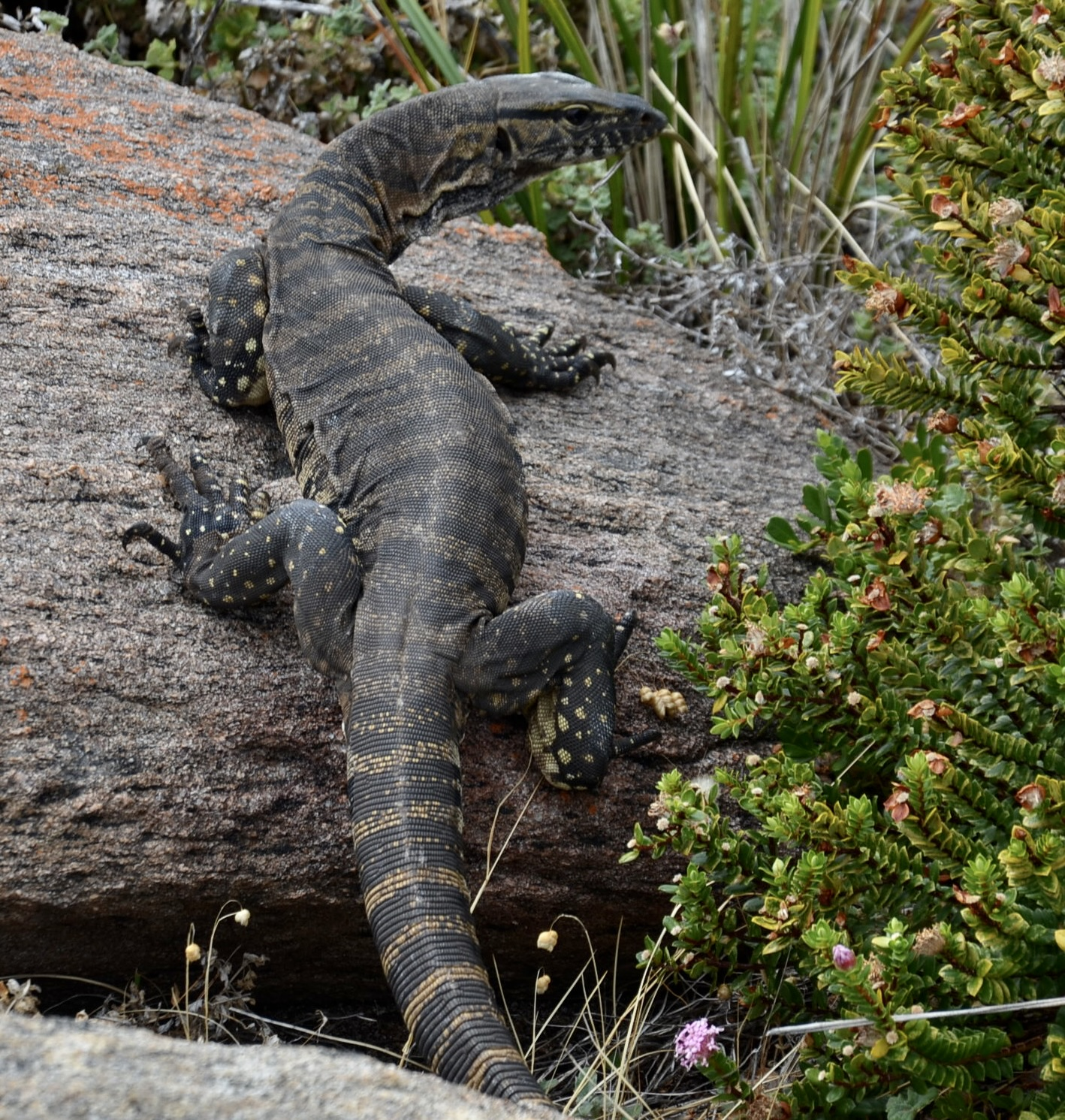
Western Australia, Cape Leeuwin
