= Bothriocroton glebopalma =

Scientific classification
- Kingdom: Animalia
- Phylum: Arthropoda
- Subphylum: Chelicerata
- Class: Arachnida
- Order: Ixodida
- Family: Ixodidae
- Genus: Bothriocroton
- Species: B. glebopalma

Binomial name
- Bothriocroton glebopalma (Keirans, King & Sharrad, 1994)^{ex Varanus glebopalma; Prince Regent River Reserve, Western Australia}

Synonyms
- Aponomma (Bothriocroton) glebopalma Keirans, King and Sharrad, 1994

Australian tick species

Bothriocroton glebopalma is a hard-bodied tick species endemic to Australia.

The species is named for its host Varanus glebopalma, the twilight monitor - "glebopalma" literally means "earth palm", and refers to the shiny pads found on the undersides of the lizard's feet. The species also parasitises Varanus glauerti, and is sympatric with Amblyomma glauerti.

B. glebopalma's geographic distribution is closely correlated with the range of their host species, and thus, they are found in the arid grasslands and escarpments of northern Australia, including Queensland, Northern Territory and Western Australia. Little is known of the specific life-cycle of the species, although its sympatry with Amblyomma glauerti suggests that its off-host stages would subsist in the crevices where the host lizards rest.

== Description ==
B. glebopalma, like all Bothriocroton, tend to be large, round ticks. Females have a wide, punctate scutum that is ornamented in three large patches, and an alloscutum characterised by many short, white, 'peg-like' setae. Males are a rough, spiny tick with typically eight white ornamentation patches across the conscutum. The species can be differentiated from its sympatric heterolog Amblyomma glauerti by its dentition - B. glebopalma has two stout files, whereas A. glauerti has a 4/4 dental formula. Moreover, while B. glebopalma males have a circular body profile without marginal grooves, A. glauerti males are elliptical, with a punctate marginal groove.

Diagnostically, B. glebopalma may also be confused with B. undatum, another ornate reptile tick. However, B. undatum has a 3/3 dental formula, and males have a punctate marginal groove, and minimal conscutum setae, differentiating the two species. Generally, the unique form of scutum ornamentation, punctation and setae clearly delineate the B. glebopalma.

== Taxonomy ==
- Bothriocroton
  - - - - - Bothriocroton hydrosauri
          - Bothriocroton bulli
        - Bothriocroton dahlbergi
      - Bothriocroton undatum
    - Bothriocroton auruginans
  - - Bothriocroton concolor
    - Bothriocroton spratti

Bothriocroton species cladogram after complete mitochondrial genome phylogenies recovered in Kelava et al. (2026). B. glebopalma & B. oudemansi do not have entire mitochondrial genomes sequenced and are thus excluded.

Although it is rarely encountered by humans, B. glebopalma is the type species for the genus Bothriocroton. Originally designated as within Aponomma when first described, the species was placed into the novel subgenus Bothriocroton, due to its highly punctate scutum and peg-like setae, which were considered distinguishing factors from species in other subgenera. Bothriocroton was elevated to full generic rank in 2002.
