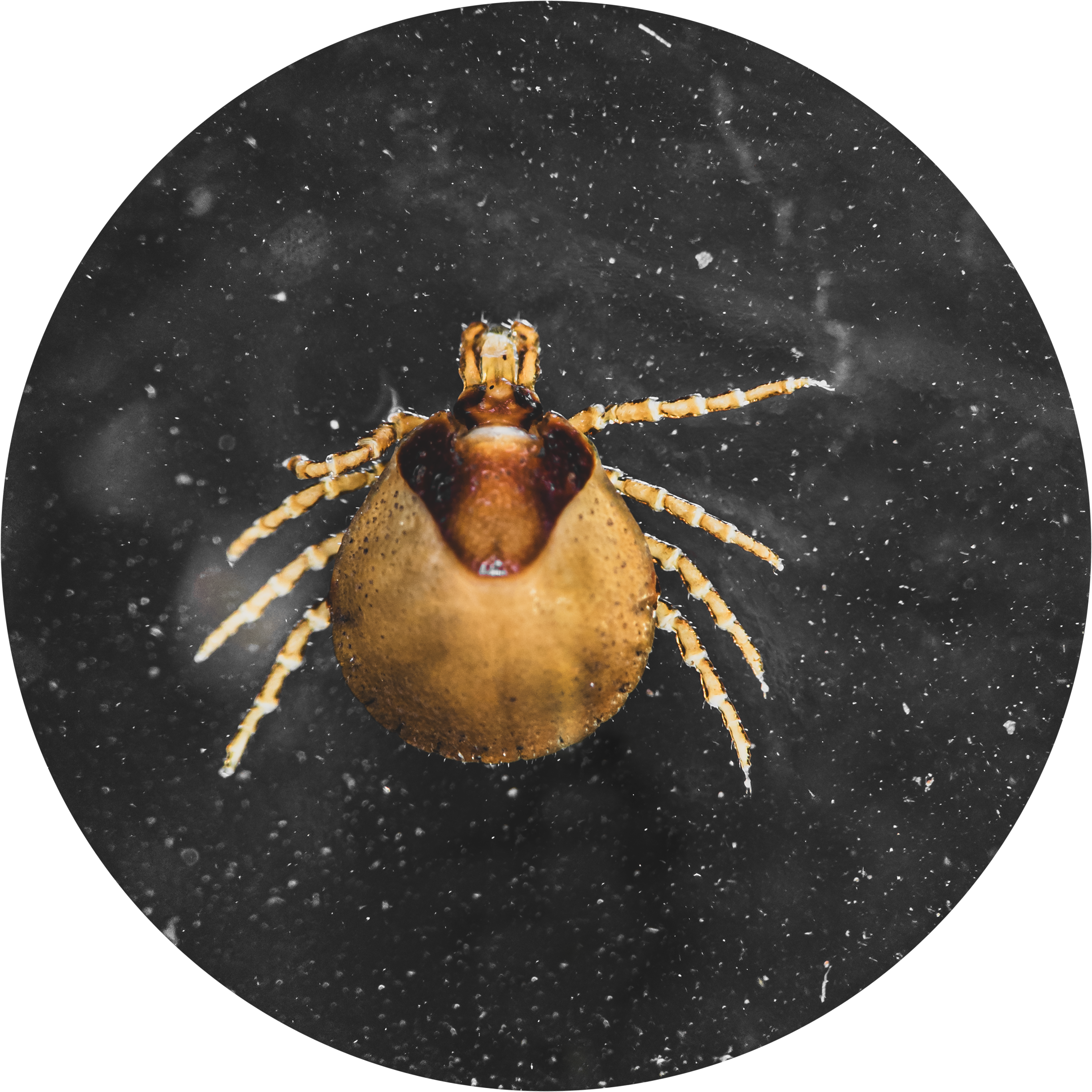
- Light micrograph of female Bothriocroton concolor

Scientific classification
- Kingdom: Animalia
- Phylum: Arthropoda
- Subphylum: Chelicerata
- Class: Arachnida
- Order: Ixodida
- Family: Ixodidae
- Genus: Bothriocroton
- Species: B. concolor

Binomial name
- Bothriocroton concolor (Neumann, 1899)^{ex Tachyglossus aculeatus; Queensland}

Synonyms
- Aponomma concolor (Neumann, 1899); Aponomma tropicum (Roberts, 1953)

= Bothriocroton concolor =

Australian tick species

Bothriocroton concolor, commonly known as the echidna tick, is a hard-bodied tick species endemic to Australia.

== Ecology and distribution ==
Bothriocroton concolor is commonly found on echidnas across eastern Queensland and northeastern New South Wales. As the name suggests, B. concolor has strict host specificity to echidnas, specifically the short-beaked echidna, Tachyglossus aculeatus. The species is the most common tick of echidnas in its distribution. In central Queensland, it may be confused with B. hydrosauri, which is also common on echidnas in that region. Other tick species that feed on echidnas include Amblyomma echidnae, Amblyomma australiense, Amblyomma moyi and Ixodes barkeri, but all of these are uncommon. B. spratti is common on echidnas in southern Australia.

== Description ==
Bothriocroton concolor, like all Bothriocroton, tend to be large, rounded ticks. They are distinguishable by the presence of a conspicuous pointed spur projecting medially from distoventral palpal segment II. Females often have pale colouring to the medial scutal aspect, and large bilateral punctations on the posterior of the lateral scutal aspects. In both sexes, the palps are more broad, dorsally, than in other Bothriocroton.

== Vector transmission ==
Bothriocroton concolor can host Borrelia tachyglossi, a bacterium related to, but distinct from Lyme disease and relapsing fever Borrelia. It is not known to be pathogenic to humans or other animals. A Rickettsia bellii sequence of unknown pathogenicity has been previously identified in three B. concolor.

== Taxonomy ==
- Bothriocroton
  - - - - - Bothriocroton hydrosauri
          - Bothriocroton bulli
        - Bothriocroton dahlbergi
      - Bothriocroton undatum
    - Bothriocroton auruginans
  - - Bothriocroton concolor
    - Bothriocroton spratti

Bothriocroton species cladogram after complete mitochondrial genome phylogenies recovered in Kelava et al. (2026). B. glebopalma & B. oudemansi do not have entire mitochondrial genomes sequenced and are thus excluded.

Bothriocroton concolor is closely related to Bothriocroton spratti. The two species are very challenging to distinguish visually, and the margin of geographic delineation is not clear. B. spratti is found in southern NSW, Victoria, Tasmania and South Australia, whereas B. concolor is known from Queensland and northern NSW.
