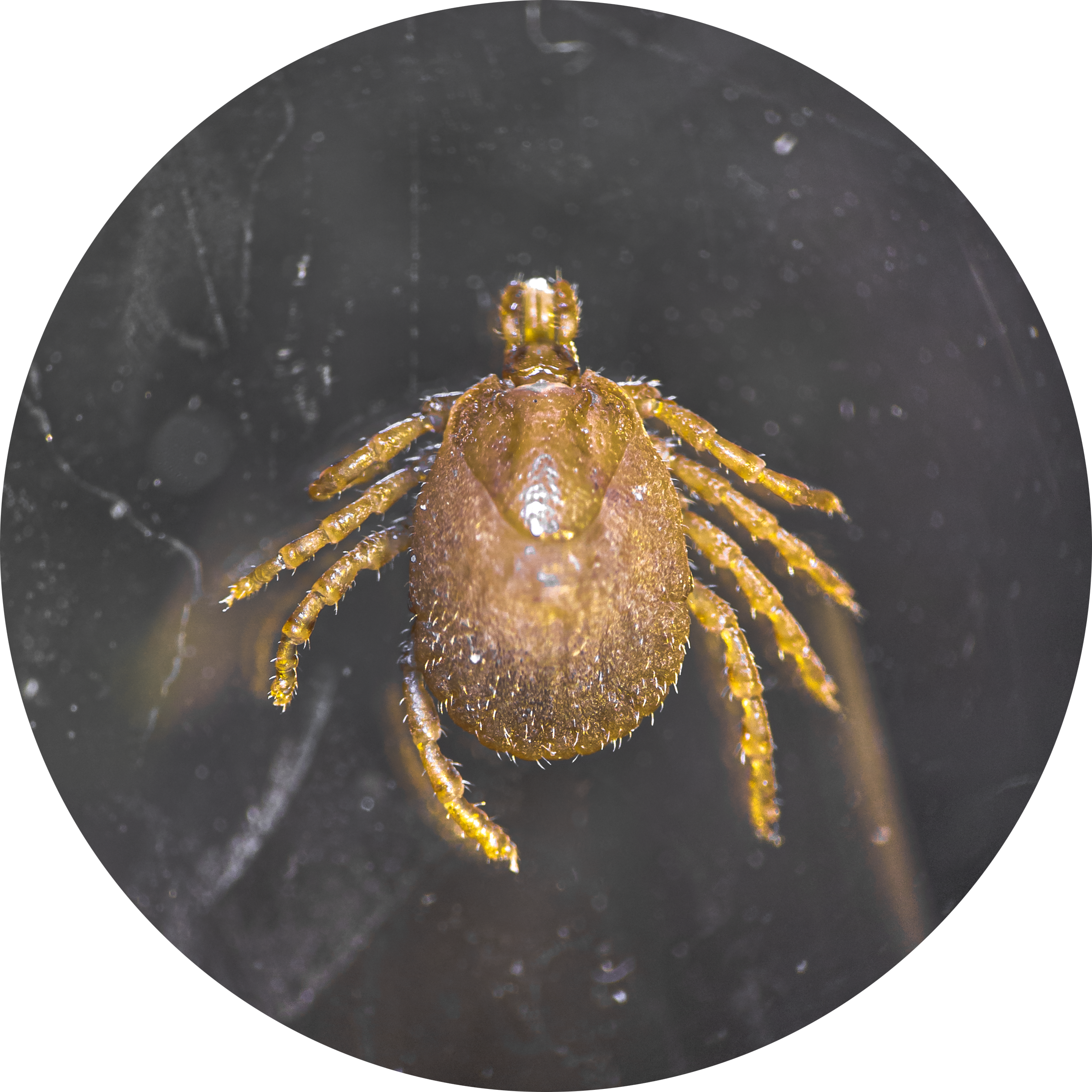
- Light micrograph of female Bothriocroton auruginans

Scientific classification
- Kingdom: Animalia
- Phylum: Arthropoda
- Subphylum: Chelicerata
- Class: Arachnida
- Order: Ixodida
- Family: Ixodidae
- Genus: Bothriocroton
- Species: B. auruginans

Binomial name
- Bothriocroton auruginans (Schulze, 1936)^{ex "wombat" likely Vombatus ursinus ; Sydney, New South Wales}

Synonyms
- Aponomma auruginans Schulze, 1936

= Bothriocroton auruginans =

Australian tick species

Bothriocroton auruginans, commonly known as the wombat tick, is a hard-bodied tick species endemic to Australia.

== Ecology ==
B. auruginans has high host specificity to wombats, specifically Vombatus ursinus, the common wombat. Their distribution is thus closely correlated with the range of their host species, which extends from the Queensland-New South Wales border down through eastern Australian, including Tasmania. Although common wombat distribution extends as far west as Adelaide, B. auruginans is ostensibly not present in western Victoria, or South Australia.

Correspondingly, the species does not infest Lasiorhinus wombats, likely due to their limited ranges in central Queensland for Lasiorhinus krefftii, and arid South Australia, for Lasiorhinus latifrons. Domestic dogs are the only other reported hosts for B. auruginans, with infections with larval or nymphal instars likely arising from contact with wombat burrows.

Although bacteria like C. burnetii have been reported in wombat ticks, there are no pathogeneses are associated with B. auruginans, likely due to its strict host specificity.

== Description ==
B. auruginans, like all Bothriocroton, tend to be large ticks. They are particularly inornate, without enamel and with minimal punctation, which distinguishes them from their sister species, B. undatum. Also contrasting is the tarsi, which are dorsally bifid into distinct lobes.

- Bothriocroton
  - - - - - Bothriocroton hydrosauri
          - Bothriocroton bulli
        - Bothriocroton dahlbergi
      - Bothriocroton undatum
    - Bothriocroton auruginans
  - - Bothriocroton concolor
    - Bothriocroton spratti

Bothriocroton species cladogram after complete mitochondrial genome phylogenies recovered in Kelava et al. (2026). B. glebopalma & B. oudemansi do not have entire mitochondrial genomes sequenced and are thus excluded.

== Etymology ==
The name auruginans comes from the latin root aurugo-, which refers to yellow or gold colouring.
