= Henry Denny =

English entomologist (1803–1871)

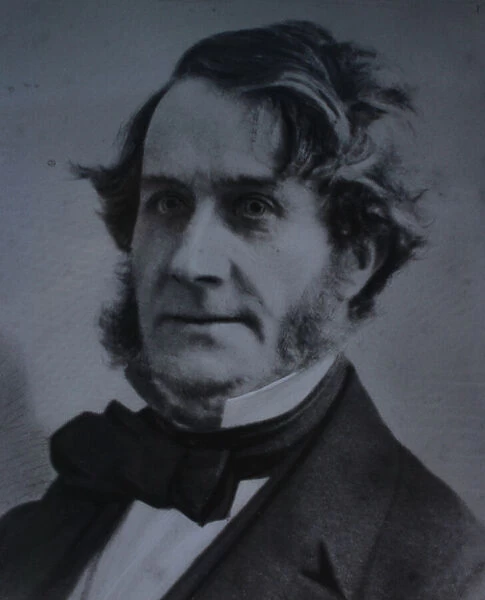

Henry Denny (1803 – 7 March 1871) was an English entomologist, known as an authority on parasitic insects. He served as the first curator of the Leeds Museum. His son Alfred Denny became a professor of zoology at the University of Sheffield.

== Life ==
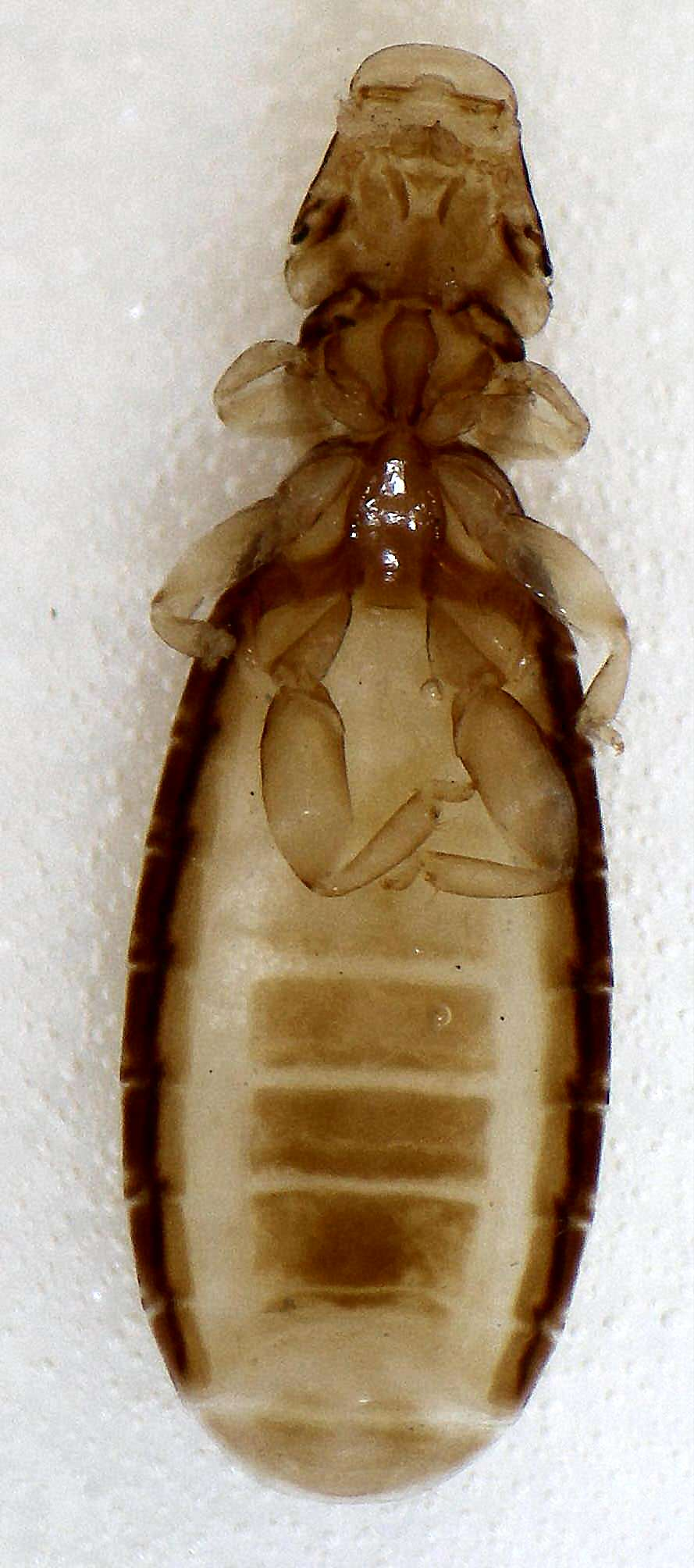
A bird louse, Ricinus bombycillae, named by Denny (1842), now in the genus Amblycera

Denny was born in Norwich. He became interested in entomology through contact with John Curtis and William Kirby. In 1821, he was a guest of Kirby for a month at Barham Rectory. He became the first salaried curator of the Leeds Museum, then the museum of the Leeds Literary and Philosophical Society, appointed in 1826. He held that post for 45 years. Also in 1825, he published a monograph on the British species of ant-loving beetles in the genus Pselaphus. In 1832 he lectured on botany at the Leeds School of Medicine. The British Association for the Advancement of Science in 1842 made a grant to Denny for the study of British Anoplura; William Kirby tried to bring him in as illustrator of his Introduction to Entomology, and he contributed a few plates for it. Denny was elected Associate of the Linnean Society in 1843. He also served as a secretary to the Yorkshire Geological and Polytechnic Society from 1845 until his death.

A good friend of Charles Darwin, Henry Denny was asked if lice affecting humans could have speciated in different parts of the world. Denny's response would be included in his treatise "The Descent of Man, and Selection in Relation to Sex". Denny's response to Darwin found its way into the book: "I am informed by Mr. Denny that the most different kinds of dogs, fowls, and pigeons, in England, are infested by the same species of Pediculi or lice."

Denny died at Leeds in 1871, at the age of 68.

== Works ==
Denny's published writings were:

- Monographia Pselaphorum et Scydmænorum Britanniæ; or an Essay on the British species of the genera Pselaphus of Herbst, and Scydmænus of Latreille, Norwich, 1825.
- Monographia Anoplurorum Britanniæ; or an Essay on the British species of Parasitic Insects belonging to the order Anoplura of Leach, London, 1842.

== Notes ==
Attribution

This article incorporates text from a publication now in the public domain: Stephen, Leslie, ed. (1888). "Denny, Henry". Dictionary of National Biography. Vol. 14. London: Smith, Elder & Co.
