= Amblyomma fimbriatum =

Scientific classification
- Kingdom: Animalia
- Phylum: Arthropoda
- Subphylum: Chelicerata
- Class: Arachnida
- Order: Ixodida
- Family: Ixodidae
- Genus: Amblyomma
- Species: A. fimbriatum

Binomial name
- Amblyomma fimbriatum Koch, 1844.

Species of tick

Amblyomma (Aponomma) fimbriatum is a species of tick, a blood feeding parasite. The hosts include the goanna Varanus rosenbergi.
