= Amblyomma trimaculatum =

Scientific classification
- Kingdom: Animalia
- Phylum: Arthropoda
- Subphylum: Chelicerata
- Class: Arachnida
- Order: Ixodida
- Family: Ixodidae
- Genus: Amblyomma
- Species: A. trimaculatum

Binomial name
- Amblyomma trimaculatum Lucas, 1878

Synonyms
- Aponomma trimaculatum Neumann, 1899; Aponomma undatum Schulze, 1933 (misapplied name); Aponomma (Aponomma) trimaculatum Santos Dias, 1993; Ixodes trimaculatus Lucas, 1878

Species of tick

Amblyomma trimaculatum, is a hard-bodied tick of the genus Amblyomma. It is found in Papua New Guinea, Australia, Indonesia, Solomon Islands, and Sri Lanka. It is primarily an ectoparasite of monitor lizards and snakes.
