= Louis Georges Neumann =

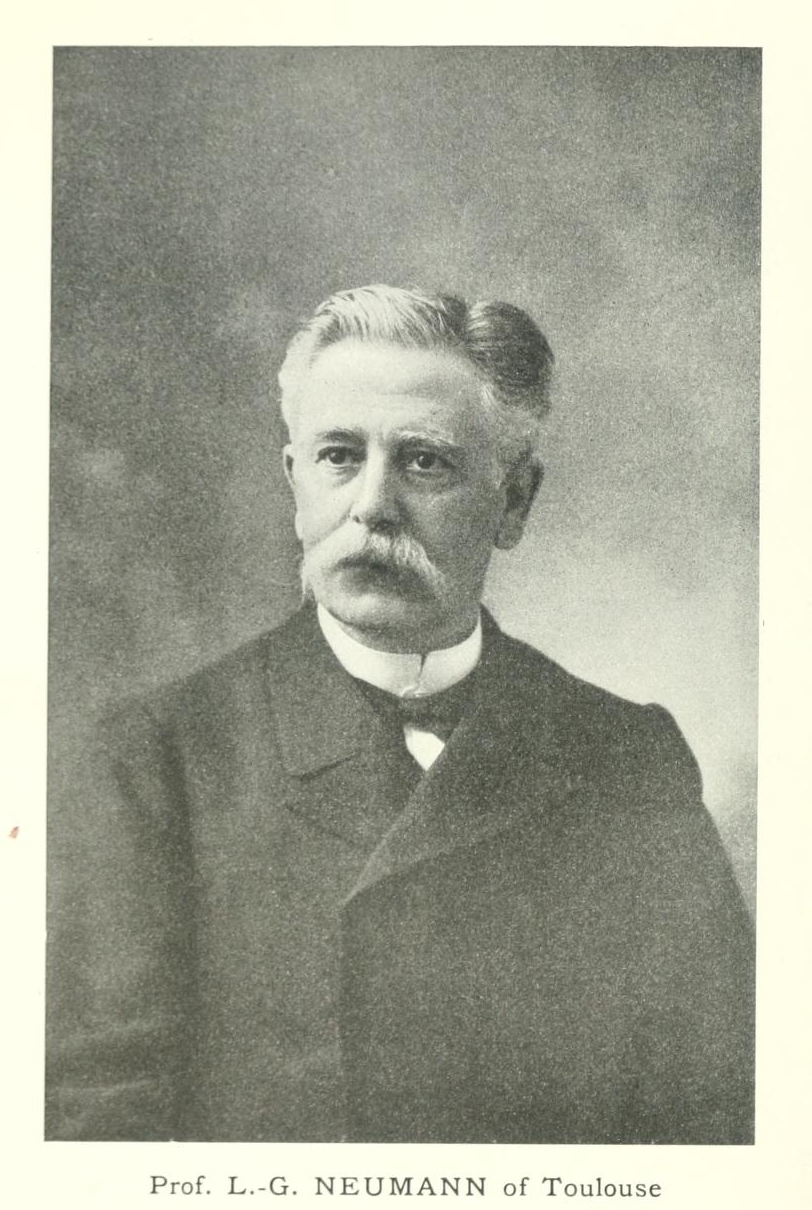

Louis Georges Neumann (22 October 1846 – 28 June 1930) was a French veterinary parasitologist who specialized in ticks. He was a professor at the Veterinary School in Toulouse.

Neumann was born in Paris and was orphaned at a young age. He studied veterinary medicine at the Maisons-Alfort National Veterinary School in 1868 and joined the French army working at the cavalry school in Saumur. He became a lecturer at the École nationale vétérinaire de Toulouse in 1878 and a professor two years later. He worked on helminth parasites initially but soon started examining the arthropods starting with some interest in the mallophaga but he gave the greatest attention to the ticks and became a leading expert on them. He published numerous descriptions of new species and received collections from around the world. He revised the taxonomy of ticks in the family Ixodidae as part of the German zoological volumes Tierreich. In 1896 he wrote a book on the biographies of famous veterinarians. He was elected to the French Academy of Sciences in 1918. He collaborated with Alcide Railliet, G.H.F. Nuttall, V.I. Yakimov, and others parasitologists from around the world.

The mite genus Neumannella Trouessart, 1916 and many species of parasite such as Haemaphysalis neumanni have been named after him.
