= Midichloria =

"Candidatus Midichloria"

Scientific classification (Candidatus)
- Domain: Bacteria
- Phylum: Pseudomonadota
- Class: Alphaproteobacteria
- Order: Rickettsiales
- Family: "Candidatus Midichloriaceae"
- Genus: "Candidatus Midichloria"
- Species: "Ca. M. mitochondrii"

Binomial name
- "Candidatus Midichloria mitochondrii"

Genus of bacteria

"Candidatus Midichloria" is a candidatus genus of Gram-negative, non-endospore-forming bacteria, with a bacillus shape around 0.45 μm in diameter and 1.2 μm in length. First described in 2004 with the temporary name IricES1, "Candidatus Midichloria" species are symbionts of several species of hard ticks (e.g., Ixodes ricinus and Ixodes uriae of the Ixodidae family). They live in the cells of the ovary of the females of this tick species. These bacteria have been observed in the mitochondria of the host cells, a trait that has never been described in any other symbiont of animals.

"Candidatus Midichloria" bacteria seem to consume the mitochondria they parasitize, possibly using them as a source of energy and/or molecules to multiply. The interaction of these symbionts with their host is currently unknown, though the 100% prevalence in the females of the host tick suggests a mutualistic association. Although there is no evidence that even up to 20 bacteria residing within the host cell mitochondria produce deleterious effects in Rhipicephalus bursa, the prevalence in R. bursa was estimated at 33% in females and 14% in males, suggesting that the relationship may be more complicated than previously thought. In I. ricinus, between 10 and 20 bacteria are known to produce deleterious effects, leading to the conclusion that "Candidatus Midichloria" consume mitochondria.

== Species ==
Only one species, "Candidatus Midichloria mitochondrii", is described in this genus. Molecular screenings, however, have detected the presence of related bacteria in other tick species, as well as in other blood-sucking arthropods, suggesting the possibility of horizontal transmission of these bacteria.

It was given its own family, "Candidatus Midichloriaceae", in the Rickettsiales. Some poorly studied candidate species belonging to this family may include Nicolleia massiliensis and the unclassified Montezuma strain.

== Naming ==
The name of this bacterial genus, "Candidatus Midichloria", is derived from the fictional midichlorians, a symbiotic, microscopic life form, which allow beings to communicate with the Force described in the fictional Star Wars universe.

== Genome ==
The genome of "Ca. M. mitochondrii" has been sequenced by an international scientific consortium formed by researchers at the University of Milan, the University of Sydney, the University of Valencia, the University of Pavia, and the University of Milan Bicocca.

The genome is 1.2 Mb, and it is, for most characteristics, very similar to the genomes of the other Rickettsiales, with two notable exceptions; the genome of M. mitochondrii contains the gene sets for the synthesis of the flagellum and of a cytochrome cbb3 oxidase.

== "Candidatus Midichloria" and the origin of mitochondria ==
Schematic ribosomal RNA phylogeny of Alphaproteobacteria

- Magnetococcidae
  Magnetococcus marinus
- - Caulobacteridae
    - Holosporales
    - Hyphomicrobiales, Rhodobacteraceae,
      Rhodospirillales, Sphingomonadales, etc.
  - Rickettsidae
    - Pelagibacterales
      - Pelagibacteraceae
        Pelagibacter
      - Subgroups Ib, II, IIIa, IIIb, IV and V
    - Rickettsiales
      - Proto-mitochondria
      - - Anaplasmataceae
          - Neorickettsia
          - - Wolbachia
            - - Anaplasma
              - Ehrlichia
        - - Midichloriaceae
            Midichloria
          - Rickettsiaceae
            - Orientia
            - Rickettsia

The cladogram of Rickettsidae has been inferred by Ferla et al. from the comparison of 16S + 23S ribosomal RNA sequences.

The Rickettsiales are widely believed to be the closest relatives to mitochondria. Based on the fact that the "Candidatus Midichloria" genes for the flagellum and for the cbb_{3} cytochrome oxidase were proven to be ancestral, the genes were inferred to have been present in the bacterium that established the symbiosis with the ancestor of the eukaryotic cell, which became the mitochondrion.

Hence, sequencing the genome of "Ca. M. mitochondrii" allowed an improved reconstruction of the mitochondrion's hypothetical free-living ancestor: It was a motile bacterium able to survive in microaerophilic conditions. Both these characteristics may have played an important role in the beginning of the symbiosis between the eukaryotic cell and the mitochondrion.
