= Neoehrlichia mikurensis =

Scientific classification
- Domain: Bacteria
- Kingdom: Pseudomonadati
- Phylum: Pseudomonadota
- Class: Alphaproteobacteria
- Order: Rickettsiales
- Family: Anaplasmataceae
- Genus: Neoehrlichia
- Species: N. mikurensis

Binomial name
- Neoehrlichia mikurensis

Human pathogen

Neoehrlichia mikurensis (NM), previously known as Candidatus Neoehrlichia mikurensis, is an intracellular, gram-negative bacteria belonging to the family Anaplasmataceae. Using ticks as vectors, it spreads between animals - mainly rodents, but other mammals as well as humans can get infected. After Borrelia and Rickettsia, it is believed to be the third most common tick-borne pathogen able to infect humans. Between 2009 and 2019, 45 human cases of NM-infections were found in Sweden.

== Disease and diagnostics ==
The disease caused by NM is called neoehrlichiosis. It usually presents with symptoms such as fever and vascular complications of unclear origin, e.g., thromboembolisms. Today, the disease is diagnosed using NM-specific PCR. To determine that NM is present in an animal, samples must be taken and analysed using PCR and sequencing . The primer used is specific for organisms of the Anaplasmataceae and Rickettiaceae families. Once the material has been amplified, phylogenetic studies of the 16S rRNA-sequence are performed, along with sequencing of fragments of the 16s rRNA-gene and the groEL-gene.

Routine microbiological methods can not be employed to find NM as intracellular bacteria cannot be cultivated on cell-free media.

== History ==
During the last 20 years several bacteria within the family Anaplasmataceae have been discovered. Among others, one was found in the Netherlands in 1999, and another – nearly identical – was found in rats in Japan. The latter was given the name Candidatus Neoehrlichia mikurensis after the island Mikura-jima where the rats were collected. The bacteria kept the name Candidatus until 2019 when it was first cultivated. It has been isolated from rodents, which are believed to act as reservoirs for the pathogen, as well as from the ticks which act as vectors. The ticks have been found to mainly belong to the genus Ixodes.

In September 2009 the first human case of an NM-infection was found. The patient was a Swedish, 77-year-old man with chronic B-cell lymphoma with symptoms of sepsis. Several blood cultures were taken, and though they all came back negative, sepsis was still suspected. A panbacterial 16s rRNA gene PCR was performed, and sequencing the amplified material resulted in a 100% match for NM. Cultivation of the pathogen was not successful until 2019, when a research group at the University of Gothenburg infected both tick-cell lines and human endothelial cells using blood from immunocompromised neoehrlichiosis patients.

== Systematics ==
NM belongs to the family Anaplasmataceae together with Ehrlichia, Anaplasma, Neorickettsia, Aegyptianella and Wolbachia. Several similar species have also been discovered, among them Candidatus Neoehrlichia lotoris, which has been isolated from racoons and is thought to be the closest relative to NM.

== Morphology and cell tropism ==
Because of the difficulty in cultivating NM, not much is known about its morphology, life cycle and cellular tropism, but it is believed to have similar characteristics of the other bacteria belonging to the Anaplasmataceae. All other bacteria in the family are obligate intracellular bacteria that reproduce within membrane-bound vacuoles inside the cytoplasm of eukaryotic blood cell, which indicates that NM, too, should display similar characteristics. Furthermore, the Anaplasmataceae are pleiomorphic cocci which range in size between 0.5 and 1.2 μm.

The precise cellular tropism for NM has not yet been determined, but a study from 2019 showed that human endothelial cells are certainly one of the targets. Electron micrographs of rat spleens have shown rounded, pleiomorphic structures with the correct size for NM, but seeing as no labelling was done using DNA-probes or specific antibodies, these have not been formally proven to be NM.

== Reservoirs and vectors ==
Rodents act as reservoirs for several zoonotic pathogens, which can be transferred between different hosts, both animal and human, through various means. The main reservoirs for NM are voles and mice. In one study done in southern Sweden, it was found that 8.8% of the rodents were carriers of NM. The pathogen has also been found in deer, wild boars and sheep, including mouflons. It can also infect humans, and between 2009 and 2019, 45 cases were found.

NM is spread between the different reservoirs using ticks, mainly of the genus Ixodes. The pathogen enters the ticks when it bites a mammal carrying the disease, and once inside the tick the bacteria replicates and collects in the salivary glands, ready to be introduced to the next host. In Sweden, the most common vector for transferring NM is Ixodes ricinus.
