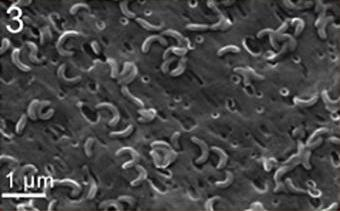
- Microscopy image of SAR11

Scientific classification (Candidatus)
- Domain: Bacteria
- Kingdom: Pseudomonadati
- Phylum: Pseudomonadota
- Class: Alphaproteobacteria
- Subclass: "Rickettsidae"
- Order: "Candidatus Pelagibacterales"; Grote et al. 2012

Families
- "Pelagibacteraceae"

= Pelagibacterales =

"Candidatus Pelagibacterales"

Order of bacteria

The "Candidatus Pelagibacterales" are an order in the Alphaproteobacteria composed of free-living marine bacteria that make up roughly one in three cells at the ocean's surface. Overall, members of the Pelagibacterales are estimated to make up between a quarter and a half of all prokaryotic cells in the ocean.

Initially, this taxon was known solely by metagenomic data and was known as the SAR11 clade. It was first placed in the Rickettsiales, but was later raised to the rank of order, and then placed as sister order to the Rickettsiales in the subclass Rickettsidae. It includes the highly abundant marine species Pelagibacter ubique.

Bacteria in this order are unusually small. Due to their small genome size and limited metabolic function, Pelagibacterales have become a model organism for 'streamlining theory'.

P. ubique and related species are oligotrophs (scavengers) and feed on dissolved organic carbon and nitrogen. They are unable to fix carbon or nitrogen, but can perform the TCA cycle with glyoxylate bypass and are able to synthesise all amino acids except glycine, as well as some cofactors. They also have an unusual and unexpected requirement for reduced sulfur.

P. ubique and members of the oceanic subgroup I possess gluconeogenesis, but not a typical glycolysis pathway, whereas other subgroups are capable of typical glycolysis.

Unlike Cyanobacteria, green sulfur bacteria, or purple bacteria, P. ubique does not produce ATP from light via photosynthesis — it does not use light to increase the bond energy of an electron pair. Rather, a mechanism involving proteorhodopsin (including retinol biosynthesis) is used for ATP production from light.

SAR11 bacteria are responsible for much of the dissolved methane in the ocean surface. They extract phosphate from methylphosphonic acid.

Although the taxon derives its name from the type species P. ubique (status Candidatus species), this species has not yet been validly published, and therefore neither the order name nor the species name has official taxonomic standing.

== Subgroups ==
Currently, the order is divided into five subgroups:

- Subgroup Ia, open ocean, crown group — includes P. ubique HTCC1062
- Subgroup Ib, open ocean, sister clade to Ia
- Subgroup II, coastal, basal to Ia + Ib
- Subgroup III, brackish, basal to I + II along with its sister clade IV
- Subgroup IV, also known as the LD12 clade, freshwater
- Subgroup V, which includes alphaproteobacterium HIMB59, basal to the remainder

The above results in a cladogram of the Pelagibacterales as follows:

- - - - Subgroup Ia (named Pelagibacteraceae, includes Pelagibacter)
      - Subgroup Ib
    - Subgroup II
  - - - Subgroup IIIa
      - Subgroup IIIb
    - Subgroup IV (named LD12 clade, includes SAR11 bacteria)
- Subgroup V (includes α-proteobacterium HIMB59)

== Phylogenetic placement and endosymbiotic theory ==
A 2011 study by researchers of the University of Hawaiʻi at Mānoa and Oregon State University, indicated that SAR11 could be the ancestor of mitochondria in most eukaryotic cells. However, this result could represent a tree reconstruction artifact due to compositional bias.

Schematic ribosomal RNA phylogeny of Alphaproteobacteria

- Magnetococcidae
  Magnetococcus marinus
- - Caulobacteridae
    - Holosporales
    - Hyphomicrobiales, Rhodobacteraceae,
      Rhodospirillales, Sphingomonadales, etc.
  - Rickettsidae
    - Pelagibacterales
      - Pelagibacteraceae
        Pelagibacter
      - Subgroups Ib, II, IIIa, IIIb, IV and V
    - Rickettsiales
      - Proto-mitochondria
      - - Anaplasmataceae
          - Neorickettsia
          - - Wolbachia
            - - Anaplasma
              - Ehrlichia
        - - Midichloriaceae
            Midichloria
          - Rickettsiaceae
            - Orientia
            - Rickettsia

The cladogram of Rickettsidae has been inferred by Ferla et al. from the comparison of 16S + 23S ribosomal RNA sequences.

== See also ==
- Iodidimonas
