= Rickettsia heilongjiangensis =

Scientific classification
- Domain: Bacteria
- Kingdom: Pseudomonadati
- Phylum: Pseudomonadota
- Class: Alphaproteobacteria
- Order: Rickettsiales
- Family: Rickettsiaceae
- Genus: Rickettsia
- Species group: Spotted fever group
- Species: R. heilongjiangensis

Binomial name
- Rickettsia heilongjiangensis Fournier et al., 2003

Species of bacterium

Rickettsia heilongjiangensis is a species of gram negative Alphaproteobacteria, within the spotted fever group, being carried by ticks. It is pathogenic (causing specific rickettsiosis called Far Eastern spotted fever).
