= Rickettsia aeschlimannii infection =

Rickettsia aeschlimannii

Scientific classification
- Domain: Bacteria
- Kingdom: Pseudomonadati
- Phylum: Pseudomonadota
- Class: Alphaproteobacteria
- Order: Rickettsiales
- Family: Rickettsiaceae
- Genus: Rickettsia
- Species group: Spotted fever group
- Species: R. aeschlimannii

Binomial name
- Rickettsia aeschlimannii Beati et al., 1997

Rickettsia aeschlimannii infection
- Specialty: Infectious disease

Rickettsia aeschlimannii infection is a condition characterized by a rash of maculopapules.

== See also ==
- Tick-borne lymphadenopathy
- American tick bite fever
- List of cutaneous conditions
