= Rickettsia monacensis =

Scientific classification
- Domain: Bacteria
- Kingdom: Pseudomonadati
- Phylum: Pseudomonadota
- Class: Alphaproteobacteria
- Order: Rickettsiales
- Family: Rickettsiaceae
- Genus: Rickettsia
- Species group: Spotted fever group
- Species: R. monacensis

Binomial name
- Rickettsia monacensis Simser et al. 2002

Species of bacterium

Rickettsia monacensis is a tick-borne (Ixodes ricinus and Ixodes nipponensis) spotted fever group Rickettsia species.
