= Rickettsia raoultii =

Scientific classification
- Domain: Bacteria
- Kingdom: Pseudomonadati
- Phylum: Pseudomonadota
- Class: Alphaproteobacteria
- Order: Rickettsiales
- Family: Rickettsiaceae
- Genus: Rickettsia
- Species group: Spotted fever group
- Species: R. raoultii

Binomial name
- Rickettsia raoultii Mediannikov et al. 2008

Species of bacterium

Rickettsia raoultii is a tick-borne pathogenic spotted fever group Rickettsia species borne by Dermacentor ticks.
