= Rickettsia japonica =

Scientific classification
- Domain: Bacteria
- Kingdom: Pseudomonadati
- Phylum: Pseudomonadota
- Class: Alphaproteobacteria
- Order: Rickettsiales
- Family: Rickettsiaceae
- Genus: Rickettsia
- Species group: Spotted fever group
- Species: R. japonica

Binomial name
- Rickettsia japonica Uchida et al., 1992

Species of bacterium

Rickettsia japonica is a species of Rickettsia. It can cause Japanese spotted fever.
