= Rickettsia felis =

Scientific classification
- Domain: Bacteria
- Kingdom: Pseudomonadati
- Phylum: Pseudomonadota
- Class: Alphaproteobacteria
- Order: Rickettsiales
- Family: Rickettsiaceae
- Genus: Rickettsia
- Species group: Spotted fever group
- Species: R. felis

Binomial name
- Rickettsia felis Bouyer et al., 2001 emend. La Scola et al., 2002

Species of bacterium

Rickettsia felis is a species of bacterium, the pathogen that causes cat-flea typhus in humans, also known as flea-borne spotted fever. Rickettsia felis also is regarded as the causative organism of many cases of illnesses generally classed as fevers of unknown origin in humans in Africa.

== Transmission and concerns ==
Fleas are the main vectors of Rickettsia felis and it is present in cat fleas worldwide. Human infection usually results from flea feces coming into contact with scratched or broken skin. Human infection is known as cat flea rickettsiosis, flea-borne spotted fever, and cat flea typhus. An eschar develops at the site of the flea bite. Doxycycline is used for treatment of clinical patients.

Fleas are believed to be the likely reservoir of R. felis. R. felis is transmitted transovarially between fleas.

More recently, some authorities have published increasing concerns about the role of more and more species of arthropod vectors of this organism; Rickettsia felis has by now been detected in many arthropods in the wild, including various species of mites, ticks, blood-sucking bugs in the genus Cimex, sucking lice, flea species of various types, both free-living and "sticktight fleas", and various other biting insects. In particular there is concern about the prevalence of Rickettsia felis in regions such as parts of sub-Saharan Africa, in mosquito genera such as Anopheles, Aedes, Mansonia, and Culex; all of these genera include species that are challenging to control and have long been recognised as effective vectors of various important human and animal diseases.

The mosquito species Anopheles gambiae, which is notorious mainly as a malaria vector, has been demonstrated to be a competent vector for Rickettsia felis. More unexpectedly, cells of some important disease vector species of mosquitoes in the genus Aedes, which is most commonly seen as a vector for arboviruses, support growth of Rickettsia felis. In addition, in tropical regions where Aedes albopictus and Aedes aegypti are established disease vectors and ectoparasites of humans, patients have tested positive for Rickettsia felis. To some authorities this suggests that Aedes species might be able to infect their hosts with Rickettsia felis, and that patients in, or returning from, the tropics with fevers of unknown origin, should be tested for Rickettsia felis infection. They see as very real, the possibility that Rickettsia felis might be the next mosquito-borne pathogen to emerge as a multi-continental disease outbreak.

== Australia ==
Human cases of Rickettsia felis were diagnosed in Australia in 2009, these were the first reported human infections in Australia.

== Diagnosis ==
Diagnosis of R. felis infection requires specific polymerase chain reaction (PCR) testing to distinguish serological results from R. typhi infection.
