= Rickettsia peacockii =

Scientific classification
- Domain: Bacteria
- Kingdom: Pseudomonadati
- Phylum: Pseudomonadota
- Class: Alphaproteobacteria
- Subclass: "Rickettsidae"
- Order: Rickettsiales
- Family: Rickettsiaceae
- Genus: Rickettsia
- Species group: Spotted fever group
- Species: R. peacockii

Binomial name
- Rickettsia peacockii NIEBYLSKI et al., 1997

Species of bacterium

Rickettsia peacockii is a species of gram negative Alphaproteobacteria of the spotted fever group, identified from Rocky Mountain wood ticks (Dermacentor andersoni). Its type strain is Skalkaho^{T}. The organism is passed transstadially and transovarially, and infections are localized in ovarial tissues.
