= Rickettsia helvetica =

Scientific classification
- Domain: Bacteria
- Kingdom: Pseudomonadati
- Phylum: Pseudomonadota
- Class: Alphaproteobacteria
- Subclass: "Rickettsidae"
- Order: Rickettsiales
- Family: Rickettsiaceae
- Genus: Rickettsia
- Species group: Spotted fever group
- Species: R. helvetica

Binomial name
- Rickettsia helvetica Beati, Peter, Burgdorfer, Aeschlirnami & Raoult, 1993

Species of bacterium

Rickettsia helvetica, previously known as the Swiss agent, is a bacterium found in Dermacentor reticulatus and other ticks, which has been implicated as a suspected but unconfirmed human pathogen. First recognized in 1979 in Ixodes ricinus ticks in Switzerland (hence the designation helvetica) as a new member of the spotted fever group of Rickettsia, the R. helvetica bacterium was eventually isolated in 1993. Although R. helvetica was initially thought to be harmless in humans and many animal species, some individual case reports suggest that it may be capable of causing a nonspecific fever in humans. In 1997, a man living in eastern France seroconverted to Rickettsia 4 weeks after onset of an unexplained febrile illness. In 2010, a case report indicated that tick-borne R. helvetica can also cause meningitis in humans.

Molecular evidence suggests that in Croatia, as many as 10% of D. reticulatus ticks are infected with R. helvetica. In addition to this, R. slovaca is found in another 2%, and 1% are infected with both species.

== Signs and symptoms ==
Erythema migrans or rash was observed at all combinations of seroreactivity, with symptoms including fever, muscle pain, headache, and respiratory problems.

The spots (erythema migrans) are described as red spots, much lesser in size than those seen in Lyme disease, but sometimes no spots occur at all.

== Epidemiology ==
In 80 healthy Swedish blood donors, about 1% were seroreactive for Rickettsia spp., interpreted as past infection. In a prospective study of Swedish recruits who trained in the coastal areas, 8.9% showed seroconversion

== Treatment ==
As with other rickettsioses, the treatment of choice is doxycycline

== See also ==
- Ticks of domestic animals
