= Rickettsia asiatica =

Scientific classification
- Domain: Bacteria
- Kingdom: Pseudomonadati
- Phylum: Pseudomonadota
- Class: Alphaproteobacteria
- Order: Rickettsiales
- Family: Rickettsiaceae
- Genus: Rickettsia
- Species group: Spotted fever group
- Species: R. asiatica

Binomial name
- Rickettsia asiatica Fujita et al. 2006

Species of bacterium

Rickettsia asiatica is a tick-borne pathogenic species borne by Ixodes ovatus. The type strain of Rickettsia asiatica sp. nov. is IO-1^{T} (=CSUR R2^{T}).
