= Rickettsia australis =

Scientific classification
- Domain: Bacteria
- Kingdom: Pseudomonadati
- Phylum: Pseudomonadota
- Class: Alphaproteobacteria
- Order: Rickettsiales
- Family: Rickettsiaceae
- Genus: Rickettsia
- Species group: Spotted fever group
- Species: R. australis

Binomial name
- Rickettsia australis Philip, 1950

Species of bacterium

Rickettsia australis is a bacterium that causes a medical condition called Queensland tick typhus. The probable vectors are the tick species, Ixodes holocyclus and Ixodes tasmani. Small marsupials are suspected reservoirs of this bacterium.

== Early scientific history ==
In 1946 this bacterium was discovered and isolated as a new tick-borne illness that began to present in Australian soldiers stationed in northern Queensland. This illness was designated as the North Queensland tick typhus. From here, researchers began to continue this work. After many experiments were completed, such as cross-protection and serological assays in guinea pigs, it was concluded that the isolate previously seen in 1946 was a new addition to the spotted fever group. Although it was not until 1950 when the organism was officially discovered and named Rickettsia australis by a scientist with the surname Philip.

== Role in human disease ==
Rickettsia australis causes Queensland tick typhus (QTT). This disease was first identified in 1946, although the specific bacterium was not identified until 1950. Rickettsia australis produces a spectrum of symptoms ranging from headaches and fever but can ultimately lead to sepsis and vital organ failure.

== Biology ==
=== Rickettsia ===
The Rickettsia genus contain a distinct collection of intracellular gram-negative bacteria. They are serologically categorized into two major classes:

1. the spotted fever group
  - Subsets: the ancestral group & the transitional group
2. the typhus group

Rickettsia australis belongs to the category of the spotted fever group and the subset of transitional group. Together these organisms encompass more than 36 tick-borne species, 15 of these species are known causal agents of human illnesses. Of the vector-borne disease these zoonoses are among the oldest known.

=== Genome ===
Rickettsia australis is a distinct pathogen that belongs in the Rickettsial spotted fever group. It genome is sequences and is approximately 1.29 Mb (mega–base-pairs). It is also highly similar to Rickettsia akari which is the closest known phylogenetic neighbor. The chromosome has a predicted size of 1,297,390 bp. It is also known that the chromosome itself contain 1,110 genes with approximately 855 genes function to encode proteins with putative functions and 255 encode hypothetical proteins and proteins of known function. To see the whole genome project on the database Genbank the accession number is AKVZ00000000.

=== Vectors ===
The three tick species that have been identified as vectors of R. australis are Ixodes tasmani, Ixodes holocyclus, and Ixodes cornuatus. The species of ticks known to harbor R. australis typically reside along the eastern coastline ranging from the Torres Strait islands to Queensland and Victoria.

=== Mechanism ===
Once the infected tick bites an individual, the Rickettsiae bacteria can spread throughout the bloodstream. It begins by targeting the endothelium and will eventually start to target the vascular smooth muscle cells (VSMCs). Once in the bloodstream, the Rickettsia Australias can immediately begin multiplying by binary fission. If left in the body long enough without treatment, it will parasitize healthy cells and create lasting damage.

== Prevalence ==
Rickettsia australis and its associated disease Queensland Tick Typhus are an ever changing diseases with growing public health importance.
