= Rickettsia sibirica =

Scientific classification
- Domain: Bacteria
- Kingdom: Pseudomonadati
- Phylum: Pseudomonadota
- Class: Alphaproteobacteria
- Order: Rickettsiales
- Family: Rickettsiaceae
- Genus: Rickettsia
- Species group: Spotted fever group
- Species: R. sibirica

Binomial name
- Rickettsia sibirica Zdrodovskii, 1948

Species of bacterium

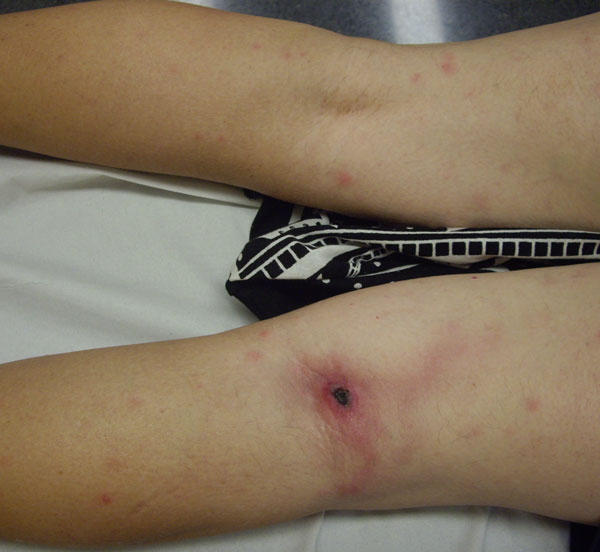
Inoculation eschar on popliteal area and discrete maculopapular elements in patient with lymphangitis infected with Rickettsia sibirica mongolitimonae

Rickettsia sibirica is a species of Rickettsia. This bacterium is the etiologic agent of North Asian tick typhus, which is also known as Siberian tick typhus. The ticks that transmit it are primarily various species of Dermacentor and Haemaphysalis.
