= Ixodes tasmani =

Scientific classification
- Kingdom: Animalia
- Phylum: Arthropoda
- Subphylum: Chelicerata
- Class: Arachnida
- Order: Ixodida
- Family: Ixodidae
- Genus: Ixodes
- Species: I. tasmani

Binomial name
- Ixodes tasmani Neumann, 1899
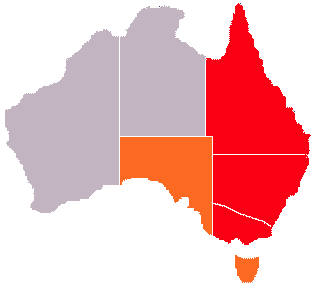
- Range of I. tasmani in eastern Australia. Red depicts a high population size while orange represents mid population size

Species of tick (common marsupial tick)

Ixodes tasmani, colloquially known as the common marsupial tick, is an Australian species of hard-bodied tick. It is a common vector for certain pathogens. There are around 70 species of ticks found in Australia, 16 of which, Ixodes tasmani included, are able to parasitize humans.

== Taxonomy ==
The Ixodes tasmani was formally described in 1899 by the French parasitologist Louis Georges Neumann. He chose the specific epithet to honour the memory of the Dutch seafarer Abel Tasman who had discovered Tasmania.

== Anatomy, life cycle and behavior ==
Ixodes tasmani exhibits a few anatomical differences compared to other ticks species. The most important is that they tend to have a much shorter mouthpiece, and to compensate for this, this species can produce cement that attaches them more firmly to their host. Ixodes tasmani's entire life cycle can be completed in as little as four months. It has been found on 42 species of hosts, with most being the Australian marsupials, monotremes, rodents, domestic animals, and humans but has never been recorded on birds or reptiles. Ixodes tasmani is a three-host tick, meaning that it will switch to different hosts between each of its critical life stages.

The Ixodes tasmani have been observed to follow a diurnal rhythm of detachment from their hosts, meaning they detach themselves from their hosts during 'daylight' hours so they can stay near or in the hosts' dens while they sleep. Due to this behavior, it has been concluded that this species is a nidicolous tick meaning that no matter the stage of life, this tick will live in and around the resting place of its host.

== Distribution and habitat ==
I. tasmani is one of the two most commonly encountered species of Ixodes in eastern Australia (the other species is I. holocyclus). Roberts (1970) wrote that "this tick is certainly the most common and abundant species in Tasmania and has been recorded there in numerous localities. It is also widespread in Victoria. In New South Wales, there are records of its occurrence throughout the entire coastal and sub coastal areas with inland extensions to Moree, Dubbo, and Kosciusko. The species is known in Queensland throughout the coastal and sub coastal areas from Iron Range in the north and inland to Emerald and Roma. There are also several records from southeastern South Australia and south-western Western Australia".

The preferred habitats of this tick consist of tree hollows, in dense vegetation and burrows or dens.

== Zoonotic infections ==
Ixodes tasmani is a known vector for several pathogens such as Coxiella burnetii, Rickettsia australis, Rickettsia honei, Rickettsia honei subsp. marmionii. All of these pathogens will cause Q fever, Queensland tick typhus (QTT), Flinders Island spotted fever (FISF), and Australian spotted fever (ASF). Each of these diseases would be considered a zoonotic disease because it is transferred from animals to humans. A zoonotic pathogen can be bacterial, viral, or parasitic, and the transference to humans depends on the type of pathogens.
