= HTVC010P =

Virus classification
- (unranked): Virus
- Realm: Duplodnaviria
- Kingdom: Heunggongvirae
- Phylum: Uroviricota
- Class: Caudoviricetes
- Order: Caudovirales (abolished 2021)
- Family: Podoviridae
- Subfamily: incertae sedis
- Virus: HTVC010P

Species of virus

HTVC010P is a virus which was discovered by Stephen Giovannoni and colleagues at Oregon State University. The Economist reports that a February 2013 paper in Nature says that "it probably really is the commonest organism on the planet". It is a bacteriophage that infects the extremely abundant bacteria Pelagibacter ubique in the Pelagibacterales order.
