= Proto-mitochondrion =

Hypothetical endosymbiont ancestor of all mitochondria

The proto-mitochondrion is the hypothetical ancestral bacterial endosymbiont from which all mitochondria in eukaryotes are thought to descend, after an episode of symbiogenesis which created the aerobic eukaryotes.

== Phylogeny ==
The phylogenetic analyses of the few genes that are still encoded in the genomes of modern mitochondria suggest an alphaproteobacterial origin for this endosymbiont, in an ancient episode of symbiogenesis which helped to create the eukaryotes.

- Pseudomonadota
  - - Protomitochondrion Martijn et al 2018
    - - Alphaproteobacteria
        - - - Caulobacteridae
              - - Rhodospirillales, Sphingomonadales, Rhodobacteraceae, Hyphomicrobiales, Holosporales, etc
              - - - Iodidimonadales
                    - Iodidimonadaceae
                      Iodidimonas
                - Protomitochondrion Geiger et al 2023
          - - Rickettsidae
              - - Protomitochondrion Emelyanov 2001
              - - Rickettsiales
                  - - - Rickettsiaceae
                        Rickettsia
                    - - Midichloriaceae
                        Midichloria
                  - - Ehrlichiaceae
                      Neorickettsia
            - Pelagibacterales
      - Magnetococcales
  - - Zetaproteobacteria
    - Gammaproteobacteria, Betaproteobacteria, Hydrogenophilalia

Three hypothesized placements of protomitochondrion on the Pseudomonadota tree of life

Although the order Rickettsiales has been proposed as the alphaproteobacterial sister-group of mitochondria, no definitive evidence pinpoints the alphaproteobacterial group from which the proto-mitochondrion emerged, and some contradictory evidence, especially in the early, sparse genome samplings. Martijn et al found mitochondria are a possible sister-group to all other alphaproteobacteria. The phylogenetic tree of the Rickettsidae has been inferred by Ferla et al. from the comparison of 16S + 23S ribosomal RNA sequences. Geiger et alii (2023) propose placing the recently discovered (2016) genus Iodidimonas – found in a sister clade to Rickettsidae: the Caulobacteridae – as the closest free-living relative of mitochondria, as it possesses more metabolic products matching that of mitochondria today, such as cardiolipins and sphingolipids, and important genetic markers such as the COX operon and the bc_{1} complex (Complex IV and Complex III in mitochondria, respectively).

== Metabolism ==
Gabaldón & Huynen (2003) reconstructed the proteome (the entire set of proteins expressed by a genome) and corresponding metabolism of the proto-mitochondrion by comparing extant alpha-proteobacterial and eukaryotic genomes. They concluded that this organism was an aerobic alpha-proteobacterium respiring lipids, glycerol and other compounds provided by the host. At least 630 gene families derived from this organism can still be found in the 9 eukaryotic genomes analyzed in the study.

== See also ==
- Abiogenesis
- Endosymbiotic theory
- Hydrogenosome
- Midichloria
- Protocell
- Rickettsiales
