= Rickettsia honei =

Scientific classification
- Domain: Bacteria
- Kingdom: Pseudomonadati
- Phylum: Pseudomonadota
- Class: Alphaproteobacteria
- Order: Rickettsiales
- Family: Rickettsiaceae
- Genus: Rickettsia
- Species group: Spotted fever group
- Species: R. honei

Binomial name
- Rickettsia honei Stenos et al., 1998

Species of bacterium

Rickettsia honei is a species of Rickettsia.

It can cause Flinders Island spotted fever.
