= Holospora =

Scientific classification
- Domain: Bacteria
- Kingdom: Pseudomonadati
- Phylum: Pseudomonadota
- Class: Alphaproteobacteria
- Order: Holosporales
- Family: Holosporaceae
- Genus: Holospora (ex Hafkine 1890) Gromov and Ossipov 1981

Species
- Holospora caryophila (ex Preer et al. 1974) Preer and Preer 1982; Holospora elegans (ex Hafkine 1890) Preer and Preer 1982; Holospora obtusa (ex Hafkine 1890) Gromov and Ossipov 1981; "Candidatus Holospora parva" Lanzoni et al. 2016; Holospora undulata (ex Hafkine 1890) Gromov and Ossipov 1981

Family of bacteria

Holospora is a genus of bacteria.
