= Allofontibacter =

Scientific classification (Candidatus)
- Domain: Bacteria
- Phylum: Pseudomonadota
- Class: Alphaproteobacteria
- Order: Pelagibacterales
- Family: "Pelagibacteraceae"
- Genus: "Candidatus Allofontibacter" Henson et al., 2018

Species
- Candidatus Allofontibacter communis; Candidatus Allofontibacter lacus

Genus of bacteria

Allofontibacter (originally Fonsibacter) is a genus of bacteria belonging to the clade Pelagibacteraceae, a group of free-living marine bacterioplankton. This genus is unique as it has evolved to live in freshwater habitats as opposed to the other members of this clade who are marine. This genus contains two recognized species. They are Candidatus Allofontibacter communis (type species) and Canididatus Allofontibacter latus.

The morphology of members within this genus is very conserved across large evolutionary distances. They resemble small, curved rods that are roughly 1 × 0.1 μm in size.

== History ==
This genus is difficult to cultivate on agar plates due to their lifestyle. In fact, their strain was not isolated until 2018. This difficulty of cultivation and thus study has caused Allofontibacter to change named many times from Fonsibacter to its current name and now potentially Fontibacterium.

== Habitat ==
This lineage has evolved for life in freshwater ecosystems and are oftentimes the most dominant group of freshwater bacterioplankton. They can survive in brackish water environments with salinities of up to~5. They were able to transition from marine to fresh water habitats through several key gene losses for osmolyte uptake.

== Ecology ==
It has an aerobic, chemoorganoheterotrophic lifestyle, thriving in oligotrophic environments with simple carbon compounds and likely depends on reduced organosulfur compounds and ammonium as its sulfur and nitrogen sources.

== Genome ==
Allofontibacter has the smallest genome yet of any member of the SAR11 clade. They have a complete Embden–Meyerhof–Parnas glycolysis pathway, TCA cycle, non-mevalonate terpenoid biosynthesis, numerous amino acid synthesis pathways, TRAP transporters for C4-dicarboxylate compounds, and ABC transporters for various amino acids. This genus also contains a likely homologous recombination of malate synthase from outside of the SAR11 clade and analogous substitutions of ion transporters with others that occur throughout the rest of the SAR11 clade. It has a streamlined genome with few paralogs, short intergenic spaces, and a conserved hypervariable regions. It also possesses Isocitrate lyase, which is novel to this genus.

It has been confirmed that there is a lack of phosphoenolpyruvate carboxylase (ppc) and several missing pathways for DMSP, glycine-betaine, and methylamine metabolism.
