= Lyticum =

Scientific classification
- Domain: Bacteria
- Kingdom: Pseudomonadati
- Phylum: Pseudomonadota
- Class: Alphaproteobacteria
- Subclass: "Rickettsidae"
- Order: Rickettsiales
- Family: Ehrlichiaceae
- Genus: Lyticum (ex Preer et al. 1974) Preer and Preer 1982

Type species
- Lyticum flagellatum (ex Preer et al. 1974) Preer and Preer 1982

Genus of bacteria

Lyticum is a genus in the phylum Pseudomonadota (Bacteria).

== Etymology ==
The name Lyticum derives from:
Neo-Latin lyticus (from Greek lutikos, λυτικός), able to loosen, able to dissolve; to give Lyticum, dissolver.

== Species ==
The genus contains two species:

- Lyticum flagellatum ( (ex Preer et al. 1974) Preer and Preer 1982, nom. rev. (type species of the genus)
- Lyticum sinuosum ( (ex Preer et al. 1974) Preer and Preer 1982, nom. rev.
