= Tick-borne lymphadenopathy =

- Specialty: Infectious diseases

Tick-borne lymphadenopathy is infectious disease, an uncommon tick-borne rickettsiosis caused by Rickettsia slovaca. It is transmitted exclusively by the Dermacentor marginatus tick. It is endemic to parts of east and south Europe.

Infection is associated with formation of an eschar at the site of the tick bite, constitutional symptoms (fever and pains), and lymphadenopathy chiefly affecting the neck. A maculopapular rash may sometimes also arise.

== Epidemiology ==
Presence of R. slovaca has been documented in Slovakia, Czechia, Ukraine, Russia, Armenia, Switzerland, France, Portugal, as well as others.

Serologic evidence of infections has moreover been noted in Germany, Austria, and Lithuania.

== See also ==
- Epidemic typhus
- Brill–Zinsser disease
- Rickettsia aeschlimannii infection
- List of cutaneous conditions
