= Magnetococcus =

Scientific classification
- Domain: Bacteria
- Kingdom: Pseudomonadati
- Phylum: Pseudomonadota
- Class: Magnetococcia
- Order: Magnetococcales
- Family: Magnetococcaceae
- Genus: Magnetococcus; Bazylinski et al. 2013

Type species
- Magnetococcus marinus Bazylinski et al. 2013

Species
- M. marinus Bazylinski et al. 2013; "Ca. M. massalia" Lefèvre et al. 2009; "Ca. M. yuandaduensis" corrig. Lin and Pan 2009

Order of bacteria

Magnetococcus is a genus of Alphaproteobacteria.
