= Tetracoccus =

Tetracoccus may refer to:

- Tetracoccus (bacterium), a genus of the Rhodobacteraceae
- Tetracoccus (plant), a plant genus in the family Picrodendraceae
- Tetracoccus, a genus of algae in the family Dictyosphaeriaceae, now called Westella
