= Willard S. Moore =

American marine scientist

Willard S. Moore is an American marine scientist and Distinguished Professor Emeritus in the School of the Earth, Ocean and Environment at the University of South Carolina, where he has been a faculty member since 1976. He is widely recognized for his pioneering research on submarine groundwater discharge and the application of naturally occurring radionuclides as tracers in ocean and coastal systems. He is a Fellow of the American Association for the Advancement of Science and the American Geophysical Union.

== Early life and education ==
Moore earned his B.S. from Millsaps College and an M.A. from Columbia University. For his doctoral research at the State University of New York at Stony Brook, he made the first measurements of radium-228 in the ocean and established its worldwide oceanic distribution. He spent one year at the Tata Institute of Fundamental Research, Bombay, India, as a post-doctoral scholar in 1971.

== Career ==
Moore began his professional career in the early 1970s as a civilian researcher at the Naval Oceanographic Office in Maryland, where he focused on deep ocean processes using naturally occurring radioactive elements as tracers. He invented a fiber coated with manganese dioxide that was effective at removing radium from water. This discovery enabled the collection of large volume water samples for radium isotope measurements.

He moved to the University of South Carolina in 1976, where he built a distinguished career spanning more than five decades. His research has focused on the use of radium isotopes and other radionuclides to understand timescales and processes in oceans, estuaries, rivers, and lakes. With Ralph Arnold he developed an instrument for measuring extremely low activities of radium-224 and radium-223 in water. These isotopes proved effective in estimating coastal ocean exchange rates and residence times of water in estuaries. He has served as Principal Investigator on several major international oceanographic programs, including GEOSECS, MANOP, TTO, AmaSeds, and GEOTRACES.

One of his most significant contributions to science is the concept of the subterranean estuary, a term he coined to describe the zone where groundwater and seawater interact in permeable coastal and shelf sediments. He was able to apply his early discovery of excess radium-228 in the ocean to demonstrate that submarine groundwater discharge rivals river input as a source of nutrients and trace elements to estuarine and coastal environments. SGD may also play a role in reducing dissolved oxygen concentrations – in some cases leading to hypoxic conditions.

== Research and publications ==
Moore has published 293 scientific papers, four of which have been cited more than 1,000 times each, accumulating over 16,000 citations. In 2024, he was invited by the Annual Review of Marine Science to write his scientific autobiography, published in the January 2025 issue. He holds two United States Patents related to manganese oxide coated acrylic fibers for the removal of trace elements and radionuclides from water — US Patent 3,965,283 (1976) and US Patent 4,087,583 (1978).

== Awards and Honors ==
- Fellow, American Association for the Advancement of Science
- Fellow, American Geophysical Union
- Bostwick H. Ketchum Award, Woods Hole Oceanographic Institution (1999)
- University of South Carolina Education Foundation Award for Research in Science & Engineering (1993)
- Member, The Explorers Club
