= Aegyptianella =

Scientific classification
- Domain: Bacteria
- Kingdom: Pseudomonadati
- Phylum: Pseudomonadota
- Class: Alphaproteobacteria
- Subclass: "Rickettsidae"
- Order: Rickettsiales
- Family: Ehrlichiaceae
- Genus: Aegyptianella; Carpano 1929

Type species
- A. pullorum

Genus of bacteria

Aegyptianella is a genus in the phylum Pseudomonadota (Bacteria).

== Etymology ==
The name Aegyptianella derives from:
Neo-Latin feminine gender dim. noun Aegyptianella (from Latin noun Aegyptus), named after Egypt where the organism was described (in 1929).

== Species ==
The genus contains a single species, namely A. pullorum (Latin noun pullus, a young fowl, chicken; Latin genitive case pl. noun pullorum, of young fowls.)

== See also ==
- Bacterial taxonomy
- Microbiology
