= Papaya Bunchy Top Disease =

Bacterial plant disease

Papaya Bunchy Top Disease was first discovered in 1931 in Puerto Rico. Early on, the identity of the pathogen was highly contested due to the inability of isolating it; thus Koch’s postulates could not be fulfilled. Scientists have previously believed that Papaya Bunchy Top Disease was caused by a virus, a mycoplasma-like organism (MLO), or a phytoplasma, but these possible pathogens have since been disproven. Since the identity of the pathogen was unknown, all diagnoses were given solely based on a list of commonly associated symptoms. Through sequencing and microscopy, scientists identified the pathogen to be a part of the genus Rickettsia in 1996. The bacterium is described as being rod-shaped, small, gram-negative, and laticifer-inhibiting. Rickettsia causes diseases in animals, such as typhus and spotted fever, as well as in other plants, such as phony disease of peach and almond leaf scorch. Papaya Bunchy Top is found throughout the American tropics and has been economically important due to its major impact on fruit production. There is little information about the current economic impact.

== Hosts and symptoms ==
Papaya is the only known host of the disease. Symptoms typically appear around 30 to 45 days after infection. Early symptoms are chlorosis and stunting of young leaves, accompanied by internode and petiole elongation. As the disease progresses petioles and leaves become rigid and thickened. Chlorosis spreads to older leaves followed by necrosis and water-soaked spots appear on the petioles and stems. In diseased plants, flowers and fruit are rarely produced and during advanced stages of the disease, the papaya plant becomes denuded except for a few stunted leaves that remain at the apex. If fruit do set during infection, they are bitter tasting and unmarketable. Dieback can occur in some varieties of papaya when infected. A lack of latex flow from the leaves, stems, petioles, and fruit. was historically a very important symptom of diagnosis but has since found to be unreliable; making it important to look at many different symptoms before making a final diagnosis. Development rate and severity of symptoms are highly variable due to host, genotype, and region.

== Environment ==
Papaya Bunchy Top Disease is found only in tropical areas within the Americas. It is vectored by two species of leafhopper, Empoasca papayae Oman (Sein) and Empoasca stevensi Young. The species that vector the disease is dependent on the geographical location. E. papayae is most commonly associated with vectoring the disease because of its wide distribution throughout the American tropics. E. stevensi has a smaller distribution and is mostly attributed to cases in Trinidad.

== Management ==
Tolerant papaya cultivars to Bunchy Top Disease have been found and bred to help stop the spread of disease. This is the most practical method of disease management but production of these cultivars is limited to areas with a low disease pressure. Use of clean propagation material and quick removal of diseased trees are also important to prevent spread. Use of Insecticides has also been proven effective to limit leafhopper vectors. The application of antibiotics, such as chlortetracycline or tetracycline hydrochloride, into the soil around infected plants has shown some success in treating Papaya Bunchy Top Disease but has yet to become commercially available.

== Importance ==
Infected papaya plants rarely flower or set fruit. Fruit production can therefore be significantly decreased. This can cause major agriculture losses within the American tropics, leading to economic impacts. Also if plants do produce fruit, it tends to be bitter and thus unmarketable. However, there is little current information on how this disease economically impacts the American tropics.

== Pathogenesis ==
Rickettsia is a gram-negative, rod-shaped, laticifer-inhibiting bacterium. It is typically 0.8 to 1.6 μm long and 0.25 to 0.35 μm wide. The bacteria are found within the sap of the plant. The bacteria infect the plant's cells, destroying the cytoplasm along with its organelles, causing the cells to eventually collapse.
