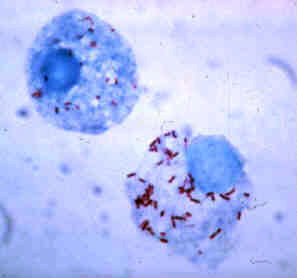
- R. rickettsii in tick hemolymph cells visualized with Gimenez stain

Scientific classification
- Domain: Bacteria
- Kingdom: Pseudomonadati
- Phylum: Pseudomonadota
- Class: Alphaproteobacteria
- Order: Rickettsiales
- Family: Rickettsiaceae
- Genus: Rickettsia
- Species group: Spotted fever group
- Species: R. rickettsii

Binomial name
- Rickettsia rickettsii Brumpt, 1922

= Rickettsia rickettsii =

Species of bacterium

Rickettsia rickettsii is a Gram-negative, intracellular, coccobacillus bacterium. R. rickettsii was first documented in the late 1890s and the disease manifestation was colloquially referred to as "black measles," but the bacterium itself was discovered and isolated as the causative agent of Rocky Mountain Spotted Fever (RMSF) in 1909 by Dr. Howard Ricketts. Having a reduced genome,making it an organo-hetereotroph that uses the host derived metabolites to fuel its tricarboxylic acid (TCA) cycle as its primary metabolic process.

These bacteria have membrane proteins that are useful in the identification of R. rickettsii strains and as a target for antibiotics. A capsule and slime layer encircling the bacterium have been proposed to allow for attachment to host cells and as a defense mechanism for resisting phagocytosis. There are strains of R. rickettsii that have different genotypes and phenotypes, which alter the pathogenicity, virulence, and the appearance of the bacteria.

R. rickettsii is the causative agent of Rocky Mountain spotted fever (RMSF) and is transferred to its host via a tick bite. It is one of the most pathogenic Rickettsia species and affects a large majority of the Western Hemisphere, most commonly the Americas. While the Rickettsia species has been found on every continent, except Antarctica; R. rickettsii causing Rocky Mountain spotted fever occurs mostly in North, Central, and South America. This prevalence is due to the species' ability to thrive in warm, damp environments, which provide sufficient conditions for the growth of the bacteria within a vertebrate host, such as a horse or dog. The disease is a zoonotic infection.

Headache, high fever, and spotted rash are some effects of the disease with more severe cases resulting in organ damage and coma. Antibiotics, such as doxycycline, target the ribosome of R. rickettsii and inhibit protein synthesis in the bacteria, providing a treatment for the disease.

== Physiology ==
=== Metabolic pathways ===
R. rickettsii is an obligate intracellular bacterium, meaning they need a host cell to replicate and survive. R. rickettsii lacks a complete glycolytic-gluconeogenic pathway as well as a pentose phosphate pathway, hallmark pathways of central carbon metabolism. It is possible that R. rickettsii once possessed complete, complex metabolic pathways that allowed it to survive outside a host, evolutionary pressures associated with adaptation to an intracellular niche have led to progressive genomic reduction. While metabolic pathways are limited, there are still many established pathways for carbohydrate and energy metabolism including the tricarboxylic acid cycle (TCA) as well as diversions to produce acetyl-CoA from pyruvate oxidation, and 2-oxoglutarate / oxaloacetate from the citrate cycle. R. rickettsii primarily obtains energy through a combination of oxidative phosphorylation of imported host-derived carbon sources and likely through adenine nucleotide exchange of ATP via the ATP/ADP translocase Tlc1. Remnants of these lost metabolic pathways can be seen in analysis of R. rickettsii's genome, which contain some identified remnant enzymes of pathways that, to current study, appear to remain unfunctional in vivo, however, six biosynthesis pathways contain missing enzymes that suggest further study into these remnant pathways may lead to new discoveries. This decrease in available metabolic pathways has left R. rickettsii largely dependent on a range of transport systems to harvest essential amino acids, nucleic acids, and other metabolites from its host. This pilfering of host metabolites is characteristic of obligate intracellular bacteria, but, in the case of R. rickettsii, the extent of this process is unknown. Pyruvate can serve a carbon source for R. rickettsii, though many other amino acids and TCA cycle intermediates such as glutamine, glutamate, serine, glycine, α-ketoglutarate, and malate can be used. For lipid metabolism, a comprehensive map of fatty acid synthesis enzymes has been identified, although these pathways depend on host-derived precursors. Its outer cell membrane also contains lipopolysaccharides (LPS), including lipid A, derived from these pathways. Although it is confirmed that R. Rickettsii has canonical peptidoglycan sacculus, there is speculation regarding whether key components are synthesized internally or imported and modified. Pathways for producing critical small molecules such as riboflavin (B_{2}), nicotinamide (B_{3}), pantothenate (B_{5}), pyridoxine (B_{6}), thiamine (B1), and biotin (B_{7}) are all missing key enzymes, forcing R. rickettsii to rely solely on transmembrane transport proteins.

Overall, R. rickettsii has a genome that does not encode many of the enzymes and proteins that are required for several metabolic pathways. These bacteria import many of the metabolic intermediates, cofactors, and byproducts from the host cells' metabolic pathways to use for their own synthesis of necessary structures and energy for survival.

=== Morphology ===
Rickettsia rickettsii is a small, pleomorphic, Gram-negative coccobacillus. While published size estimates vary, common descriptions place it at less than 1 μm in width and approximately 0.5–2 μm in length. Because of its small size, most common staining methods are often ineffective for viewing requiring specialized staining methods like Gimenez stains.

R. rickettsii has an inner membrane, a peptidoglycan-containing cell wall, and an outer membrane containing lipopolysaccharide (LPS) and membrane-associated proteins, hallmarks of Gram-negative bacteria. Electron-microscopy studies have also shown two external layers: a microcapsular layer and a more external slime layer. The appearance of these external layers varies with the physiological conditions experienced by the bacterium in its tick vector. In the bacteria from infected Dermacentor andersoni ticks, both layers were distinguishable in engorged ticks but lost their discrete appearance following starvation. Feeding the ticks or incubating them at 37 °C restored these layers structure, and were associated with reactivation of virulence.

Staining studies has shown the slime layer to be largely polysaccharide in nature. Proposed functions include antigen display, phagocytosis inhibition, and host cell attachment, although these functions have not been conclusively established. Surface-associated proteins, including YbgF and TolC, have also been studied as key immunogenic targets of the bacterium.

R. rickettsii has many vital proteins within its cellular membranes. Surface associated proteins such as YbgF and TolC have been investigated as potential protective antigens of R. rickettsii. One of these proteins is YbgF, which maintains the structure of the cellular membrane. YbgF is found within both the inner and outer membranes along with another protein called TolC. TolC is a transport protein that connects to other transport proteins within the periplasmic space and inner membrane and has been shown to work as an efflux pump that likely aids in antibiotic resistance. These two proteins are believed to be associated with pathogenicity of this microbe and serve as specific points that antibodies can bind to in order to prevent the bacteria from interacting with host cells.

=== Pathophysiology ===
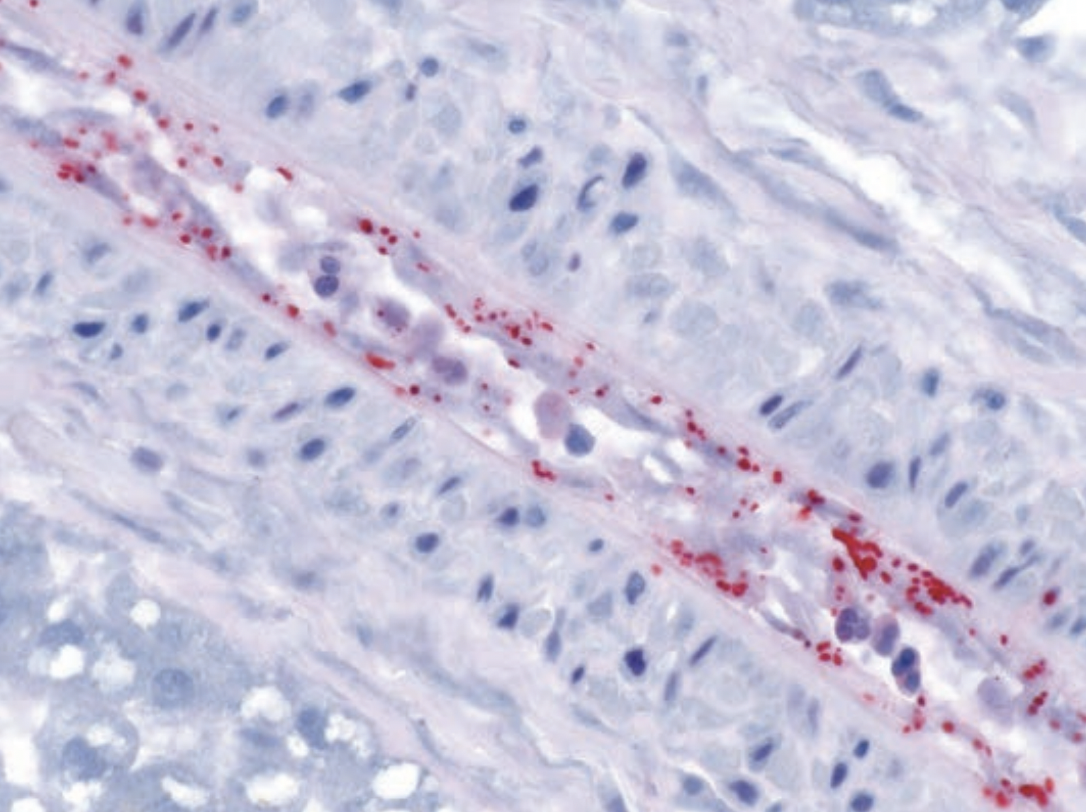
Rickettsia rickettsii (red) infecting vascular endothelial cells (Immunohistochemical stain)

R. rickettsii is an obligate intracellular bacterium that invades vascular endothelial cells that line both small- and medium-sized blood vessels in the host's body. The intracellular environment is ideal for bacterial replication. There is an extensive immune response to this pathogen that triggers different pathways in the macrovascular and microvascular systems, including inducing phagocytosis, affecting cellular entry, and intracellular actin mobility. As the cells are damaged, there is an increased permeability of the vessels (extravasation), microvascular hemorrhages, and necrosis. Additionally, experimental study of a cerebral endothelial-cell model showed evidence that R. rickettsii could possess the ability to cross the blood-brain barrier into the host's central nervous system, allowing the pathogen to target the brain's vasculature. These processes lead to the clinical manifestations of Rocky Mountain Spotted fever including edema, swelling, and increased vascular permeability and damage.

Nitric oxide (NO), produced by inducible nitric oxide synthase (iNOS) as part of the innate immune system can inhibit R. rickettsii by disrupting energy metabolism, and has the ability to inhibit the pathogen by negatively affecting attachment, intracellular growth, and subversion of the host cell as well as increased ATP depletion and inhibition of protein synthesis. The impact of nitric oxide on the metabolism is significant enough to limit the pathogens ability to attach to host cells with bacteriostatic and reversible effects. As translation is also majorly ATP-dependent, the introduction of nitric oxide can greatly reduce the process of translation and therefore protein synthesis, making R. rickettsii incapable of subverting the host cell.

Actin-based motility (ABM) is a virulence factor that allows for the pathogen to evade the host's immune cells and spread to neighboring cells via inducing polymerization of actin and moving the bacterium through the cytoplasm and between cells. The autotransporter protein Sca2 on R. rickettsii is vital to this process as it promotes actin polymerization. In fact, recent studies in guinea pigs show that mutations or disruptions in the sca2 gene impair the actin-based motility of the microbe, reduce cell-to-cell spread, and lower virulence. Which suggests that Sca2 is an important virulence factor.

Highly virulent strains of R. rickettsii are also able to suppress immune responses while dwelling in infected cells by creating inhibitory bacterial effector proteins such as Rickettsial ankyrin repeat protein 2 (RARP2) through a type IV secretion system. RARP2 mediates the fragmentation of TGN, or the trans-Golgi network, causing attenuation of vesicular transport and glycosylation defects in infected host cells. There are two important proteins within the host cell that are affected by these glycosylation defects: TGN46 and major histocompatibility complex class 1 (MHC-I). MHC-I is an important protein for defending against pathogens as it functions as an antigen presenting complex signaling its infection status to lymphocytes. However, since RARP2 causes attenuation of vesicular transport, MHC-I is unable to be transported to the plasma membrane and the infected cell will not be able to alert host immune cells. Thus, the bacterial cells are able to avoid certain immune responses and allow for proliferation within a host cell.

A common host defense mechanism against obligate intracellular bacteria is the induction of apoptosis, or programed cell death, which kills the host cells and the resident bacteria, to stop the spread of the bacterium in the host. R. rickettsii has been shown to avoid this immune response by inhibiting apoptosis in both mammalian and tick-derived cells. Firstly, in human endothelial cells, the microbe has been shown to activate NF-κB which can prevent cell death via apoptosis. Separately, as seen in studies on ticks, this microbe has also demonstrated apoptosis inhibition activity. It does so by affecting apoptosis regulators such as caspases, Bcl-2 proteins, or possibly the p53 tumor suppressor pathway. This provides an advantage, allowing R. rickettsii to proliferate further due to prolonged survival and increased time for replication. By doing so, R. rickettsii also increases its transmission abilities. Without this process in place, the pathogen may not survive long enough in the vector to properly replicate and infect other hosts.

== Genome and phenotypes ==
R. rickettsii is an obligate intracellular alpha proteobacterium that belongs to the Rickettsiaceae family. Within the genus Rickettsia, these bacteria are divided into four clades. The clades include the ancestral group, spotted fever group (SFG), typhus group, and transitional group. Factors for classifying each group may include phenotypic characteristics, phylogenetic organization, or the type of vector host it inhabits. R. rickettsii falls into the largest group of them all, the SFG group. It has a genome that consists of about 1.27 Mbp with ~1,350 predicted coding sequences, which is smaller in comparison to most other bacteria due to gene decay. Smaller genome sizes from genomic reduction in obligate intracellular bacteria allows for an intracellular lifestyle to proceed while maintaining increased pathogenicity. It is maintained in its tick host by transovarial transmission. The multiplication of R. rickettsii is by binary fission inside the cytosol.

=== Genomic comparison of strains ===
R. rickettsii has a relatively small genome; however, variances in gene expression between different strains can lead to various functions of the bacteria. For instance, there are two major strains of R. rickettsii called the Iowa and the Sheila Smith strains. The Sheila Smith strain is a virulent strain, while the Iowa strain is an avirulent strain. Microarrays revealed that there were only four distinct differences in the gene expression of R. rickettsii; however, these four changes lead to complete differences in virulence, and thus the niche of the bacteria. A key feature allowing for differentiation is the rickettsial outer membrane protein, rOmpB which contributes to the identification of R. rickettsii strains as virulent. The Iowa (avirulent) strain reportedly contains a 660 bp deletion near the 5' start of ompA, a major surface antigen gene, causing a frameshift and premature stop codon that results in protein truncation. rOmpB was noted as defective, mutations were noted in ankyrin repeat-containing proteins, and surface cell antigens Sca1 and Sca2 contained deletions that caused surface protein variation. The detection of single nucleotide polymorphisms (SNPs) is used to differentiate these strains.

In response to the Iowa strain’s 660 bp deletion poststart of ompA, protein truncation transpires. Truncation occurs when something creates an early stop codon during translation, causing interruption in genetic instruction; resulting in a shorter protein. Noticeable truncation effects relate to decreased virulence. rOmp B, a major surface antigen, was noted as present, yet showed defects in proteolytic processing. However, it is not currently known to be responsible for the defective processing, and is likely responsible for surface protein assembly and host cell interactions. Mutations were also noted in ankyrin repeat-containing proteins. The Iowa strain contains a premature termination codon at amino acid position 68 in the ankyrin repeat protein RrIowa_0290 due to a nucleotide difference. Additionally, RrIowa_1113 contains a 558-bp deletion in both the avirulent Iowa and attenuated R strain compared to the Sheila Smith and Morgan strains. The final notable difference pertains to Sca1 and Sca 2 - two surface cell antigens. Sca1 and Sca2 contained deletions that caused surface protein variation. To illustrate, Sca2 impacts the host cell’s infection dynamics via actin tail formation and intracellular motility. These deletions cause issues within virulence and motility.

== Transmission cycle ==
=== Ecology ===
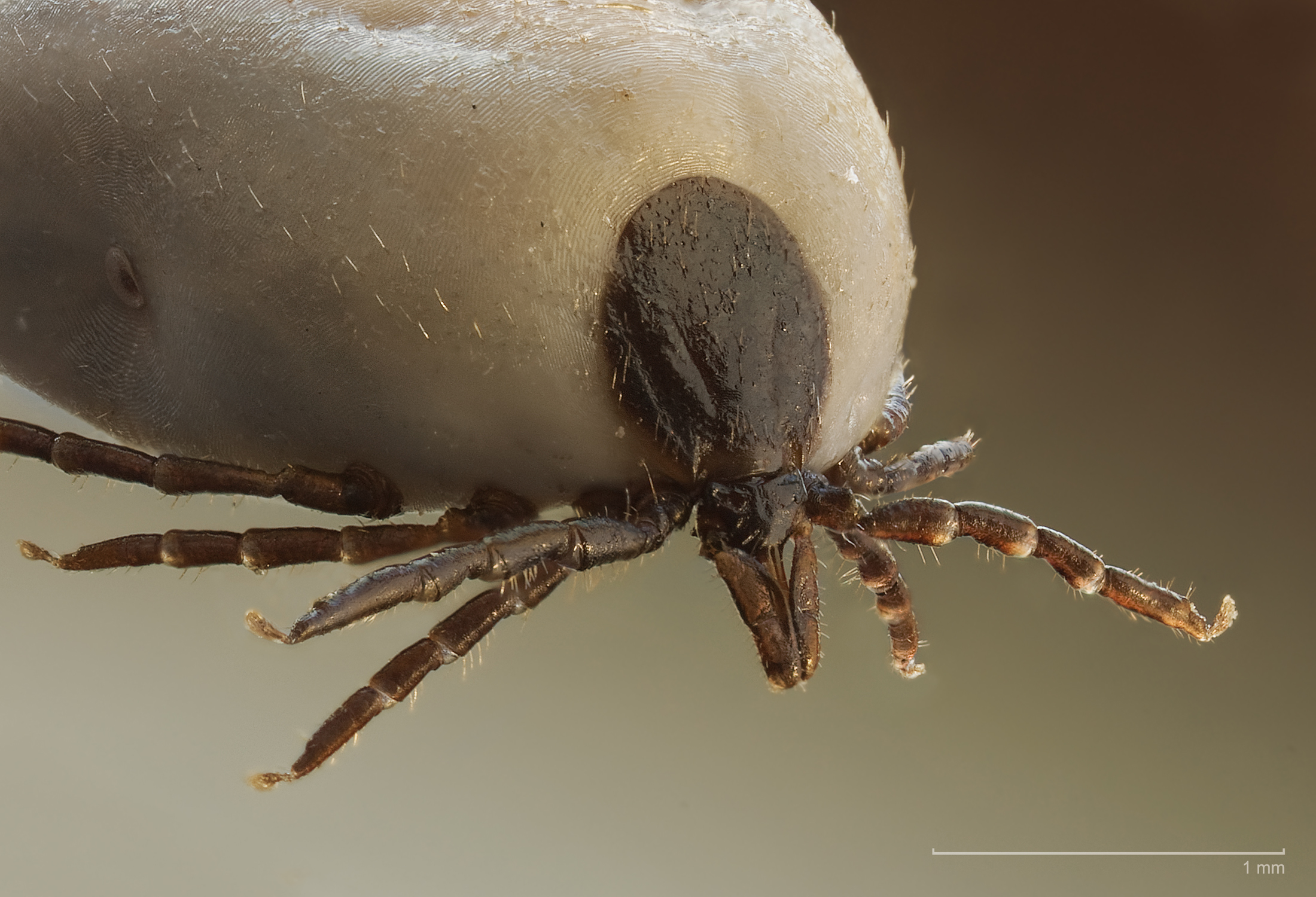
Ticks carrying R. rickettsii are found to be in the Ixodidae family. These are known as "hard-bodied ticks" and are approximately 3 mm in length. They have tear-shaped bodies with brownish coloration.

While humans are hosts for R. rickettsii, they do not contribute to rickettsial transmission. Rather, the pathogen is maintained through its vector: ticks. Ticks that carry R. rickettsii fall into the family of Ixodidae ticks, also known as "hard-bodied" ticks. Ticks are vectors, reservoirs, and amplifiers of these bacteria.

There are currently three known tick species that commonly carry R. rickettsii. The American dog tick (Dermacentor variabilis), mainly found in eastern, central, and Pacific coast United States, is the most common vector for R. rickettsii. The Rocky Mountain wood tick (Dermacentor andersoni), found in the Rocky Mountain States, and the brown dog tick (Rhipicephalus sanguineus), found in select areas of the US-Mexico border and southern United States, are also known vectors of the pathogen. Other tick vectors include the Amblyomma genus commonly found in South America. Amblyomma cajennense, the cayenne tick, is the most common vector in those areas, especially in Brazil, with Amblyomma aureolatum as a close second. A. cajennense often infects horses and capybaras in southeastern Brazil, serving as amplifier hosts for the bacteria. Other small rodent species serve as amplifier hosts in the United States and South America.

=== Transmission in ticks ===
Ticks usually acquire R. rickettsii by taking a blood meal during the larval or nymph stages from an infected vertebrate host. This mode of transmission where the infection is retained as the tick develops from one phase of life to the next is called transstadial transmission. R. rickettsii is highly lethal to its Dermacentor andersoni and Dermacentor variabilis hosts. Infection during the nymph stage significantly decreases survival and decreases reproduction rates in females that do survive. Both the American Dog Tick and the Rocky Mountain Wood Tick serve as long-term reservoirs for Rickettsia rickettsii, infecting the posterior diverticula of the midgut, the salivary glands, and the ovaries of the tick. In addition, an infected male tick can transmit the organism to an uninfected female during mating, and infected female ticks can transmit the infection to their offspring in a process known as transovarian passage. Although transovarial transmission can pass the bacteria to offspring, it is relatively inefficient and carries fitness costs like reduced tick fecundity, meaning it plays a minor role in population maintenance compared to horizontal transmission via vertebrate blood meals. Notably, R. rickettsii is inefficient at infecting the ovaries of adult female ticks, resulting in a lowered rate of vertical transmission, but still causing a lowered reproduction rate in the infected female ticks. Rickettsial colonization of the ovaries has a higher success when ticks, especially in Rhipicephalus sanguineus, obtain the pathogen as a larva or nymph. Reduced fecundity is also observed in ticks infected with R. rickettsii. As a result of these limitations, long-term maintenance of R. rickettsii in populations of ticks relies mainly on horizontal transmission through the exchange of bacteria during feedings of infected hosts.

=== Transmission in mammals ===
Rickettsia rickettsii disseminates within its tick host to the salivary glands where it can be transmitted to mammals, including humans, during feeding.

While transmission can occur in multiple ways the most common route of infection is via the bite of an infected tick. During a feeding, the tick will inject its infected saliva into the host, allowing R. rickettsii access to the bloodstream. Tick saliva contains immunomodulatory agents which affect immune defenses and hemostasis in the host, causing lowered host resistance to the bacteria.Another way to contract the infection is through contact with exposed internal tick organs and fluids.

== Clinical manifestations ==
=== Signs and symptoms ===
During the initial stages of the disease, individuals with RMSF may experience headaches, muscle aches, chills, and high fever. Other early symptoms may include nausea, vomiting, decreased appetite, and conjunctival injection (red eyes).

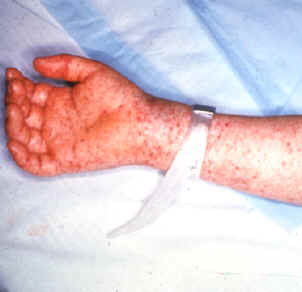
The rashes are red, flat, and the non-itchy rash is present over the forearm and palm of the infected individual.

=== Severe infections ===
Patients with severe infections may require hospitalization. Severe symptoms occur later in response to vascular endothelial injury which can lead to thrombosis (blood clotting) caused by the R. rickettsii targeting vascular tissue.

=== Diagnostic tests ===
The specialized laboratory tests confirmed by the Center for Disease and Control for detection of RMSF antibodies are serology (IFA), polymerase chain reaction (PCR), and immunohistochemistry (IHC) and culture tests. A clinician will decide which test to use based on the timing of symptom onset and specimens used for testing.
