= Marinosulfonomonas =

Scientific classification
- Domain: Bacteria
- Kingdom: Pseudomonadati
- Phylum: Pseudomonadota
- Class: Alphaproteobacteria
- Genus: Marinosulfonomonas; Holmes et al. 1997

Species
- "Marinosulfonomonas methylotropha"

Genus of bacteria

Marinosulfonomonas is a genus of bacteria in the class Alphaproteobacteria. Bacteria in the genus are able to utilize methanesulfonic acid as source for carbon and energy.
