= Queensland tick typhus =

- Other names: Australian tick typhus or Rickettsial spotted fever
- Specialty: Infectious disease

Queensland tick typhus is a zoonotic disease caused by the bacterium Rickettsia australis. It is transmitted by the ticks Ixodes holocyclus and Ixodes tasmani.

== Signs and symptoms ==
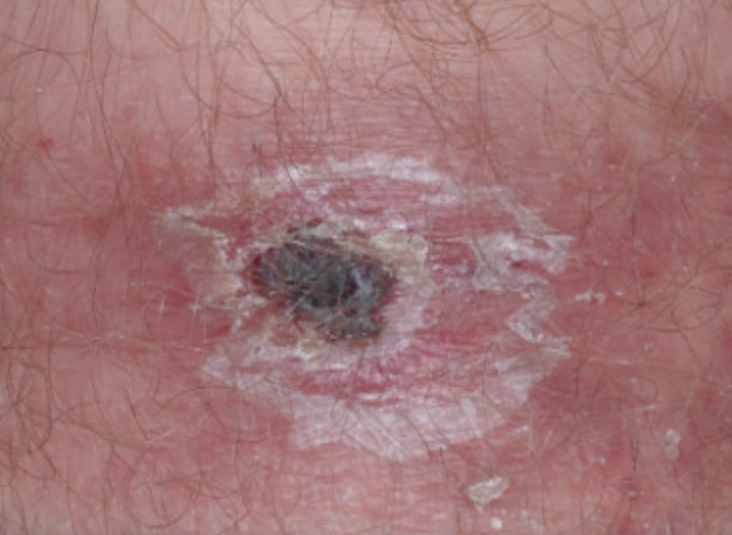
A presentation of an eschar on a person's back due to a tick bite. This suggests that this may be the initial site of contact.

Queensland tick typhus is a tick-borne disease. The onset of the illness is variable; there is an incubation period of 2 to 14 days after being bitten by the infected tick. The clinical features of this illness include fever, headache, an eschar at the site of the tick bite, erythematous eruption and satellite lymphadenopathy. Queensland tick typhus symptomatically resembles Rocky Mountain spotted fever, a less severe tick-borne disease. If left untreated for longer than one to two weeks, the disease can take longer to recover from and pose a heightened risk of pneumonitis, encephalitis, septic shock, or even death. In some cases, even after the initial rash is cleared, the person may still experience prolonged lethargy or fatigue, which is common in such rickettsial infections.

== Causes ==
Queensland tick typhus is caused by the bacteria Rickettsia australis from the genus Rickettsia.

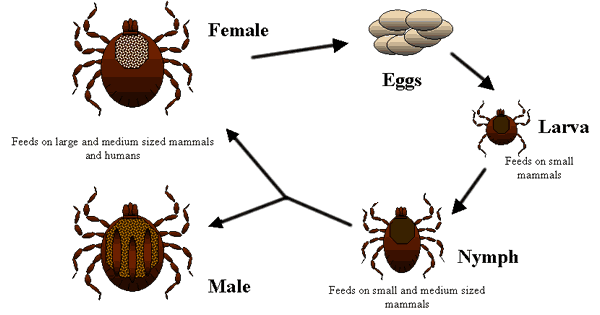
General life cycle of a typical tick

=== Tick life cycle ===
The tick life cycle consists of four stages: egg, larva, nymph, and adult. An adult female tick can lay over a thousand eggs in her lifetime. Once a tick hatches from an egg, it enters the larvae stage, where it must attach to any available host and begin feeding. After it has fed, it detaches and molts, entering the larger nymph stage. In this stage, it must reattach to a larger host and feed again, whereupon it detaches and molts again. This results in the adult stage, where it feeds one last time and can sexually reproduce.

The stage when ticks are most able to transmit this disease is the nymph stage. They are also the most dangerous in this stage since they are usually less than two millimeters in size and can stay virtually undetected until they are done feeding.

=== Transmission ===
Queensland tick typhus is transmitted primarily by two types of tick: Ixodes holocyclus and Ixodes tasmani. After the initial attachment to a host, depending on the species and life stage of the tick, it takes anywhere from 10 minutes to 2 hours for it to begin to feed. Once a tick attaches, it can stay on a host for about 12 to 18 hours and then falls off when full. A tick must be attached for a long period of time to transmit bacteria. A tick that appears flat and small probably has not eaten yet.

== Pathogenesis ==
After transmission from the infected tick, the bacterium Rickettsia australis enters the body via the bloodstream. The first sign of disease is damage to the skin's microcirculation, which results in a rash. From there, the damage continues further into vital organs and can ultimately result in sepsis with multi-organ failure if left untreated.

== Diagnosis ==
This disease can be challenging to diagnose because the initial signs are non-descript and relatively common. Analyzing recent travel history can be vital in the beginning stages of treatment. Serological assays are the best means of diagnosing this disease, with the indirect microimmunofluorescence assay (IFA) being considered the best tool. However, underlying illnesses, such as rheumatologic and other immune-mediated disorders, can lead to false positives. To combat these limitations, a PCR test may also be used; this test looks for rickettsial DNA. It can sensitively detect the target DNA in a sample taken from an eschar or blood during the first few days of infection.

== Prevention ==
There is no vaccine available for this disease, so to prevent infection, the US CDC recommends taking personal safety measures when venturing out into areas known to harbour ticks.

Before going into these areas, the following preparations should be followed:

- Wear protective clothing that will cover your arms and legs, with closed-toed shoes. Wearing long socks that you can tuck your pants into will provide an extra layer of safety, especially if you are walking in areas with tall grass for an extended period of time.
- Use strong insect repellent such as DEET on your body and Permethrin on your clothes
- If you are taking a pet with you, they should also be updated on all preventative medications, and a veterinarian should be consulted for any extra precautions.

After you return from these areas, the following precautions should be taken to prevent ticks from entering your home:

- Check clothes and gear used for any ticks. Dry clothes should be put into a dryer on high heat for 10 minutes to effectively kill any small ticks that may not be visible to the naked eye. If the clothes are wet, then they should be washed with hot water and then dried on high heat.
- Each individual should shower within two hours of returning home since this can help wash off any unattached ticks.
- Finally, a full-body check should be performed to ensure that there is no attached tick.
- If a pet was taken with you, they should receive a bath and a full-body tick check as well to ensure that they are not carrying anything into the home.

== Treatment ==
Early treatment for Queensland tick typhus is relatively simple. It includes a course of oral antibiotics such as doxycycline or chloramphenicol. If a patient cannot take the medication orally, then the antibiotics are given intravenously by a medical professional.

== Epidemiology ==
Queensland tick typhus is endemic to Australia. Since there is no compulsory reporting of rickettsial infections in Australia, it can be difficult to monitor the geographical distribution of this disease and have an accurate count of the number of cases occurring each year. The disease is most common along the east coast of Australia, coinciding with the geographic range of its tick vectors.

== History ==
This disease was noted during World War II among Australian soldiers undergoing basic training on the Atherton Tableland in Queensland. It is most common along the east coast of Australia, including that of Queensland.

== See also ==
- Typhus
- North Asian tick typhus
- Rocky Mountain spotted fever
- List of cutaneous conditions
