= Craig A. Carlson =

American oceanographer

- Born: 1963 (age 61–62)
- Citizenship: US
- Education: Colby College; University of Maryland
- Partner: Alison née Capstick
- Children: 3
- Scientific career
- Institutions: Bermuda Institute of Ocean Sciences; University of California, Santa Barbara

Craig Alexander Carlson (born 1963) is an American oceanographer. He is a founding co-editor of the Annual Review of Marine Science and a recipient of the 2015 G. Evelyn Hutchinson Award.

== Early life and education ==
Craig Alexander Carlson was born to parents Paula née Barbuto and David Carlson. He attended Colby College, graduating with his bachelor's degree in 1986. He then attended the University of Maryland for a PhD in marine science, graduating in 1994 under the advisorship of Hugh Ducklow.

== Career ==
He completed a postdoctoral appointment at the Bermuda Institute of Ocean Sciences (BIOS) where he researched the biogeochemical cycling of dissolved organic carbon in marine systems. He became a faculty member at BIOS in 1996. In 2001, he joined the University of California, Santa Barbara in the Department of Ecology, Evolution, and Marine Biology. In 2009, he was a founding co-editor of the Annual Review of Marine Science; he is still co-editor as of 2021.

== Awards and honors ==
In 2002, he was the first recipient of the Ocean Sciences Early Career Award from the American Geophysical Union. In 2015, he was awarded the G. Evelyn Hutchinson Award from the Association for the Sciences of Limnology and Oceanography for his contributions to understanding how dissolved organic carbon relates to microbes. In 2018, he was named a fellow of the American Association for the Advancement of Science.

== Personal life ==
He is married to Alison née Capstick; they have three children together.
