= Minwuia =

Scientific classification
- Domain: Bacteria
- Kingdom: Pseudomonadati
- Phylum: Pseudomonadota
- Class: Alphaproteobacteria
- Order: Minwuiales; Sun et al. 2018
- Family: Minwuiaceae; Sun et al. 2018
- Genus: Minwuia; Sun et al. 2018
- Species: M. thermotolerans

Binomial name
- Minwuia thermotolerans Sun et al. 2018

Family of bacteria

Minwuia thermotolerans is a species of bacterium. It is the only species in the genus Minwuia.
