= Rickettsiosis =

- Specialty: Infectious disease

A rickettsiosis is a disease caused by Rickettsia.

== Cause ==
Rickettsioses can be divided into a spotted fever group (SPG) and typhus group (TG).

In the past, rickettsioses were considered to be caused by species of Rickettsia. However, scrub typhus is still considered a rickettsiosis, even though the causative organism has been reclassified from Rickettsia tsutsugamushi to Orientia tsutsugamushi. Examples of rickettsioses include typhus, both endemic and epidemic, Rocky Mountain spotted fever, and Rickettsialpox. Organisms involved include Rickettsia parkeri.

Many new causative organisms have been identified in the last few decades. Most are in the genus Rickettsia, but scrub typhus is in the genus Orientia.

== Diagnosis ==
No rapid laboratory tests are available to diagnose rickettsial diseases early in the course of illness, and serologic assays usually take 10–12 days to become positive. Research is indicating that swabs of eschars may be used for molecular detection of rickettsial infections.

== Treatment ==
Doxycycline has been used in the treatment of rickettsial infection.
