= Magnetococcaceae =

Scientific classification
- Domain: Bacteria
- Kingdom: Pseudomonadati
- Phylum: Pseudomonadota
- Class: Magnetococcia
- Order: Magnetococcales
- Family: Magnetococcaceae; Bazylinski et al. 2013

Genera
- Magnetococcus Bazylinski et al. 2013; Magnetofaba Morillo et al. 2014

Order of bacteria

The Magnetococcaceae are a family of Alphaproteobacteria.
