= Holosporaceae =

Scientific classification
- Domain: Bacteria
- Kingdom: Pseudomonadati
- Phylum: Pseudomonadota
- Class: Alphaproteobacteria
- Order: Holosporales
- Family: Holosporaceae; Görtz and Schmidt 2006

Genera
- "Candidatus Bealeia" Szokoli et al. 2016; "Candidatus Cytomitobacter" Tashyreva et al. 2018; "Candidatus Gortzia" Serra et al. 2016; "Candidatus Hafkinia" Fokin et al. 2019; "Candidatus Hepatobacter Nunan et al. 2013; Holospora (ex Hafkine 1890) Gromov and Ossipov 1981; "Candidatus Hydrogenosomobacter" Takeshita et al. 2019; "Preeria" Potekhin et al. 2018; Pseudocaedibacter Quackenbush 1982; Symbiotes Philip 1956 (Approved Lists 1980); Tectibacter (ex Preer et al. 1974) Preer and Preer 1982

Family of bacteria

The Holosporaceae are a family of bacteria. The member Holospora is an intracellular parasite found in the unicellular protozoa Paramecium.

== Genome ==
Draft genome sequences are available for three Holospora species and Odyssella thessalonicensis .
