= Micropepsaceae =

Scientific classification
- Domain: Bacteria
- Kingdom: Pseudomonadati
- Phylum: Pseudomonadota
- Class: Alphaproteobacteria
- Order: Micropepsales; Harbison et al. 2017
- Family: Micropepsaceae; Harbison et al. 2017

Genera
- Micropepsis Harbison et al. 2017; Rhizomicrobium Ueki et al. 2010

Family of bacteria

The Micropepsaceae are a family of bacteria.
