= Rhodothalassium =

Scientific classification
- Domain: Bacteria
- Kingdom: Pseudomonadati
- Phylum: Pseudomonadota
- Class: Alphaproteobacteria
- Order: Rhodothalassiales; Venkata Ramana et al. 2014
- Family: Rhodothalassiaceae; Venkata Ramana et al. 2014
- Genus: Rhodothalassium; Imhoff et al. 1998
- Species: R. salexigens

Binomial name
- Rhodothalassium salexigens (Drews 1982) Imhoff et al. 1998

Genus of bacteria

Rhodothalassium is a genus of bacteria in the family Rhodothalassiaceae. Up to now there is only one species of this genus known (Rhodothalassium salexigens).
