= Neoehrlichiosis =

Tick-borne disease

- Specialty: Infectious disease

Neoehrlichiosis is a disease caused by the intracellular pathogen Neoehrlichia mikurensis. It usually presents with symptoms such as fever and vascular complications of unclear origin, e.g., thromboembolisms.

The disease is diagnosed using a Neoehrlichia mikurensis-specific PCR. Because Neoehrlichia mikurensis is an intracellular bacterium, cultivation on cell-free media and other routine microbiological methods can not be utilised for detection. This difficulty, along with being a relatively unknown disease, leads to many cases going undiagnosed for months or years, or even unrecognised entirely.

Previously, it was believed that neoehrlichiosis only affected immunocompromised patients, but more recent studies indicate that otherwise healthy individuals may also be susceptible.
