= Emcibacteraceae =

Scientific classification
- Domain: Bacteria
- Kingdom: Pseudomonadati
- Phylum: Pseudomonadota
- Class: Alphaproteobacteria
- Order: Emcibacterales; Iino et al. 2016
- Family: Emcibacteraceae; Iino et al. 2016

Genera
- Emcibacter Liu et al. 2015; Luteithermobacter Park et al. 2020; Paremcibacter Park et al. 2020

Family of bacteria

Emcibacteraceae is a family of bacteria.
