= Laticifer =

Elongated latex-secreting cell type

A laticifer is a type of elongated secretory cell found in the leaves and/or stems of plants that produce latex and rubber as secondary metabolites. Laticifers may be divided into:

- Articulated laticifers, i.e., composed of a series of cells joined together, or
- Non-articulated laticifers, consisting of one long coenocytic cell.

Non-articulated laticifers begin their growth from the meristematic tissue of the embryo, termed the laticifer initial, and can exhibit continual growth throughout the lifetime of the plant. Laticifer tubes have irregularly edged walls and a larger inner diameter than the surrounding parenchyma cells. In the development of the cell, elongation occurs via karyokinesis and no cell plate develops resulting in coenocytic cells which extend throughout the plant. These cells can reach up to tens of centimeters long and can be branched or unbranched. They are thought to have a role in wound healing and as defense against herbivory, as well as pathogen defense, and are often used for taxonomy.

Laticifers were first described by Anton de Bary in 1877.

Laticifers are highly specialized cells which can produce a wide variety of proteins. These proteins include enzymes functioning as proteinases and chitinases which help defend the producing plant against insects and other herbivores. In one study it was found that the presence and concentration of some proteins can differ greatly within the genus Croton relative to three species studied.

== Cell Turgor ==
Pressurized flow of latex has been studied in multiple Asclepias species as a form of defense in addition to the secondary metabolites stored in the latex. In order to augment the defense of the plant some non-articulated laticifer cells contain highly pressurized stores of latex. It has been noted that pressure may be produced by the osmotic uptake of water into the laticifer cell resulting in a turgid cell. When pierced the cell bursts and latex travels quickly through the canal system to stop the herbivore. A desert species, Bursera schlechtendalii, pressurizes the canals right where leaves attach to the stem so that when a grazer eats a leaf latex shoots out. This process is termed the “squirt gun” defense.
