= Japanese spotted fever =

- Other names: Oriental spotted fever
- Specialty: Infectious disease

Japanese spotted fever is a condition characterized by a rash that has early macules, and later, in some patients, petechiae.

It is caused by Rickettsia japonica.

== See also ==
- Flea-borne spotted fever
- Flinders Island spotted fever
- List of cutaneous conditions
