= Tetracoccus (bacterium) =

Scientific classification
- Domain: Bacteria
- Phylum: Pseudomonadota
- Class: Alphaproteobacteria
- Order: incertae sedis
- Family: incertae sedis
- Genus: "Tetracoccus" Blackall et al. 1997

Species
- Tetracoccus cechii

Genus of bacteria

"Tetracoccus" is a genus in the class Alphaproteobacteria.
