= Annual Review of Marine Science =

Annual peer-reviewed scientific review journal published by Annual Reviews

- Language: English
- Edited by: Craig A. Carlson, Stephen J. Giovannoni

Publication details
- History: 2009–present, 17 years old
- Publisher: Annual Reviews (US)
- Frequency: Annually
- Open access: Subscribe to Open
- Impact factor: 22.5 (2025)

Standard abbreviations
- ISO 4: Annu. Rev. Mar. Sci.

Indexing
- ISSN: 1941-1405 (print); 1941-0611 (web)
- LCCN: 2008214321
- OCLC no.: 190811370

Links
- Journal homepage

The Annual Review of Marine Science is an annual peer-reviewed scientific review journal published by Annual Reviews (AR). It was established in 2009. It covers all aspects of marine science. The co-editors are Craig A. Carlson and Stephen J. Giovannoni. As of 2023, Annual Review of Marine Science is being published as open access, under the Subscribe to Open model. As of 2026, Journal Citation Reports gives the journal a 2025 impact factor of 22.5 ranking it first out of 124 in the category "Marine & Freshwater Biology", first out of 67 in the category "Oceanography", and second out of 103 in the category "Geochemistry & Geophysics".

== History ==
The Annual Review of Marine Science was first published in 2009 by Annual Reviews (AR), a nonprofit organization whose stated mission is to synthesize knowledge "for the progress of science and the benefit of society." The journal's founding editors were Craig A. Carlson and Stephen J. Giovannoni. While it was initially published with a print edition, it is now only published online.

== Scope and indexing ==
The Annual Review of Marine Science defines its scope as covering significant developments in marine science. Included subfields are chemical, biological, geological, and physical processes that occur in the coastal and oceanic zones. It also covers marine conservation, marine biology, and technologies used in the study of oceanography. It is abstracted and indexed in Scopus, Science Citation Index Expanded, EMBASE, INSPEC, CAB Abstracts, MEDLINE, and GEOBASE, among others.

== Editorial processes ==
The Annual Review of Marine Science is helmed by the editor or the co-editors. The editor is assisted by the editorial committee, which includes associate editors, regular members, and occasionally guest editors. Guest members participate at the invitation of the editor, and serve terms of one year. All other members of the editorial committee are appointed by the AR board of directors and serve five-year terms. The editorial committee determines which topics should be included in each volume and solicits reviews from qualified authors. Unsolicited manuscripts are not accepted. Peer review of accepted manuscripts is undertaken by the editorial committee.

=== Current editorial board ===
As of 2022, the editorial committee consists of the two co-editors and the following members:

- Lihini Aluwihare
- Ken Buesseler
- Curtis Deutsch
- Stéphan J. Jorry
- Kristy J. Kroeker
- Uta Passow
- Raquel S. Peixoto
- Andrew F. Thompson
- Patricia L. Wiberg
