= Iodidimonas =

Scientific classification
- Domain: Bacteria
- Kingdom: Pseudomonadati
- Phylum: Pseudomonadota
- Class: Alphaproteobacteria
- Order: Iodidimonadales; Iino et al. 2016
- Family: Iodidimonadaceae; Iino et al. 2016
- Genus: Iodidimonas; Iino et al. 2016

Species
- Iodidimonas gelatinilytica Iino et al. 2022; Iodidimonas muriae Iino et al. 2016; Iodidimonas nitroreducens Iino et al. 2024

Family of bacteria

Iodidimonas is a genus of bacteria that oxidizes elemental iodide (I^{−}) to molecular iodine (I_{2}). It was isolated from iodide-rich brine associated with natural gas in Kujukuri, Japan.

Geiger et alii (2023) suggest that Iodidimonas may be the closest living relative of mitochondria. If true, this lineage and protomitochondria emerged from a common ancestor before the symbiogenetic event that gave rise to the eukaryotes.
