= North Asian tick typhus =

- Other names: Siberian tick typhus
- Specialty: Infectious disease

North Asian tick typhus also known as Siberian tick typhus, is a condition characterized by a maculopapular rash.

It is associated with Rickettsia sibirica.

== See also ==
- Flinders Island spotted fever
- Queensland tick typhus
- List of cutaneous conditions
