= Flea-borne spotted fever =

- Other names: California pseudotyphus
- Specialty: Infectious disease

Flea-borne spotted fever or California pseudotyphus is a condition characterized by a rash of maculopapules or furuncles.

It is caused by Rickettsia felis.

== See also ==
- American tick bite fever
- Japanese spotted fever
- List of cutaneous conditions
