= Exonuclease VII =

Exonuclease VII, large subunit

Identifiers
- Symbol: Exonuc_VII_L
- Pfam: PF02601
- InterPro: IPR020579
Available protein structures:
- PDB: IPR020579 PF02601 (ECOD; PDBsum)
- AlphaFold: IPR020579; PF02601

Exonuclease VII small subunit
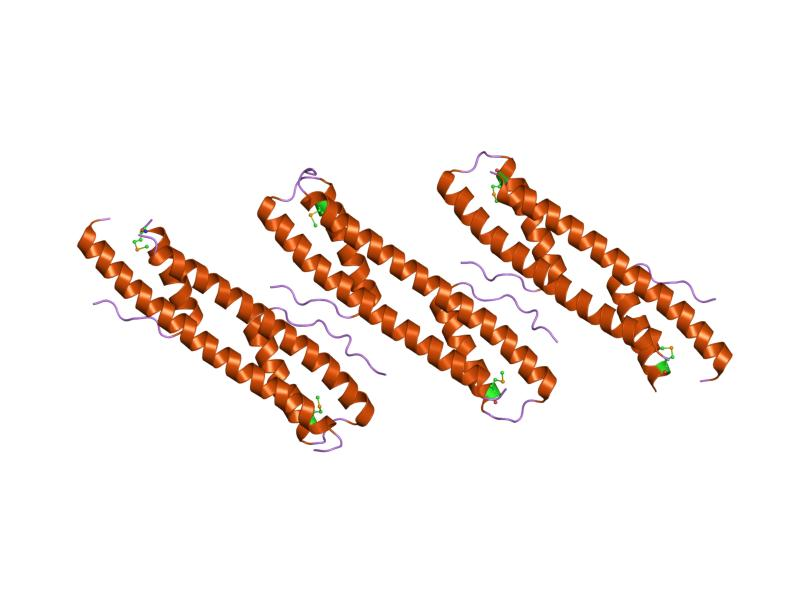
- crystal structure of exodeoxyribonuclease vii small subunit (np_881400.1) from bordetella pertussis at 2.40 a resolution

Identifiers
- Symbol: Exonuc_VII_S
- Pfam: PF02609
- InterPro: IPR003761
Available protein structures:
- PDB: IPR003761 PF02609 (ECOD; PDBsum)
- AlphaFold: IPR003761; PF02609

The enzyme exodeoxyribonuclease VII (EC 3.1.11.6, Escherichia coli exonuclease VII, E. coli exonuclease VII, endodeoxyribonuclease VII, exodeoxyribonuclease VII) is a bacterial exonuclease enzyme. It is composed of two nonidentical subunits; one large subunit and 4 small ones. that catalyses exonucleolytic cleavage in either 5′- to 3′- or 3′- to 5′-direction to yield nucleoside 5′-phosphates. The large subunit also contains an N-terminal OB-fold domain that binds to nucleic acids.

The widely used quinolone antibiotics induce DNA damage in bacterial cells by trapping DNA gyrase (an essential type II topoisomerase), leading to blocked gyrase cleavage complexes. Exonuclease VII participates in repairing such DNA damage by resolving the trapped cleavage complexes.

When Escherichia coli bacteria recA mutants are UV-irradiated, “reckless” DNA degradation occurs that involves exonuclease VII.
