= Midichloriaceae =

Candidatus Midichloriaceae

Scientific classification (Candidatus)
- Domain: Bacteria
- Phylum: Pseudomonadota
- Class: Alphaproteobacteria
- Order: Rickettsiales
- Family: Candidatus Midichloriaceae Montagna et al. 2013

Genera
- "Candidatus Aquirickettsia" corrig. Klinges et al. 2019; "Candidatus Bandiella" Senra et al. 2016; "Candidatus Cyrtobacter" Vannini et al. 2010; "Candidatus Defluviella" Boscaro et al. 2013; "Candidatus Fokinia" Szokoli et al. 2016; "Candidatus Grelliella" corrig. Gruber-Vodicka et al. 2019; "Candidatus Jidaibacter" Schulz et al. 2016; "Candidatus Midichloria" Sassera et al. 2006

Family of bacteria

"Candidatus" Midichloriaceae is a family of bacteria, included in the order Rickettsiales. No member of this family has been cultured in the laboratory, so the entire family has been given the status candidatus.
