= Stephen J. Giovannoni =

American microbiologist

- Born: San Francisco, CA, United States
- Education: University of California, San Diego; Boston University; University of Oregon
- Partner(s): Katharine G. Field; Kimberly Halsey
- Scientific career
- Institutions: Oregon State University; Bermuda Institute of Ocean Sciences; Monterey Bay Aquarium Research Institute

Stephen Joseph Giovannoni is an American microbiologist whose research mainly focuses on marine microbes. He is a fellow of the American Academy of Microbiology and a founding co-editor of the Annual Review of Marine Science.

== Early life and education ==
Stephen Joseph Giovannoni was born in San Francisco to parents Laura née Melo and Paul Giovannoni. He was one of four children, with two brothers and a sister. He was interested in the ocean from a young age, and spent much time surfing and sailing due to his proximity to San Francisco Bay. He attended the University of California, San Diego for his bachelor's degree in biology, graduating in 1974. He then graduated from Boston University with his master's degree in biology in 1978; he attended the University of Oregon for his PhD, also in biology, graduating in 1984.

== Career ==
Following his PhD, he conducted post-doctoral research with Norman R. Pace at Indiana University from 1984 to 1988. In 1988, he joined the faculty of Oregon State University as an assistant professor. He was promoted to associate professor in 1993 and full professor in 1999. From 2000 to 2004 he was the director of the Molecular and Cellular Biology Program. He has been a Distinguished Professor at Oregon State since 2012. He is an adjunct faculty member with the Bermuda Institute of Ocean Sciences and Monterey Bay Aquarium Research Institute. In 2020 he became the head of the Oregon State University Department of Microbiology.

Giovannoni's research has included the oceanic carbon cycle, marine biology, the diversity and genomics of marine microbes, and ocean acidification. He founded and directs Oregon State's High Throughput Culturing Laboratory.

In 2009 he was a founding co-editor of the Annual Review of Marine Science; he is still co-editor as of 2021. He has also served on the editorial committees of mBio, The ISME Journal, and Environmental Microbiology.

== Awards and honors ==
In 1997 he was elected as a fellow of the American Academy of Microbiology. He received the J. Roger Porter Award from the American Academy of Microbiology and Jim Tiedje Award from the International Society for Microbial Ecology in 2012. He is the eponym of the bacteria species Aquisphaera giovannonii, which was described in 2011.

== Personal life ==
He married Katharine G. Field in 1982. He is currently married to Kimberly née Halsey.
