= Flinders Island spotted fever =

- Specialty: Infectious disease

Flinders Island spotted fever is a condition characterized by a rash in approximately 85% of cases.

It is associated with the obligate intracellular bacterium Rickettsia honei.

== See also ==
- Japanese spotted fever
- North Asian tick typhus
- List of cutaneous conditions
- Flinders Island
