= Pelagibacteraceae =

Scientific classification (Candidatus)
- Domain: Bacteria
- Kingdom: Pseudomonadati
- Phylum: Pseudomonadota
- Class: Alphaproteobacteria
- Order: "Candidatus Pelagibacterales"
- Family: Pelagibacteraceae; Thrash et al. 2011

Genera
- Candidatus Allofontibacter corrig. Tsementzi et al. 2019; Candidatus Fonsibacter Henson et al. 2018; Candidatus Pelagibacter Rappe et al. 2002

Family of bacteria

The Pelagibacteraceae are a family in the Alphaproteobacteria composed of free-living marine bacteria.

Alphaproteobacteria is a type of proteobacteria, and it can be divided into several different orders, including Rhodobacterales, Rhodospirillales, and Caulobacterales. Although there are numerous orders of Alphaproteobacteria, there are over 100 families of bacteria within the class. Among these, the most abundant is the Pelagibacteraceae. According to FEMS Microbiology Ecology, "The Alphaproteobacteria family Pelagibacteraceae, or the SAR11 clade, is one of the most abundant bacterial clades in the world's oceans” (Ortmann & Santos, 2016). OpenStax Biology 2e defines clades as “groups of organisms that descended from a single ancestor” (Clark, Douglas, & Choi 2018).

The class of Proteobacteria was identified around 1980, with the discovery of Pelagibacteraceae following later. FEMS Microbiology Ecology notes that “SAR11 was first observed in the Sargasso Sea, and subsequent findings show that the clade is widespread in both marine and freshwater environments” (Ortmann & Santos, 2016). The prevalence of this bacterium across diverse habitats underscores its resilience. Despite its abundance, the factors that enable its thriving remain under investigation. Ocean-dwelling organisms often rely on specific nutrient levels, such as phosphate and nitrate, for survival. “One reason for the success of Pelagibacteraceae might be its ability to thrive under nutrient-limited conditions, like those in the open ocean, possibly due to adaptive genome streamlining” (Ortmann & Santos, 2016).
