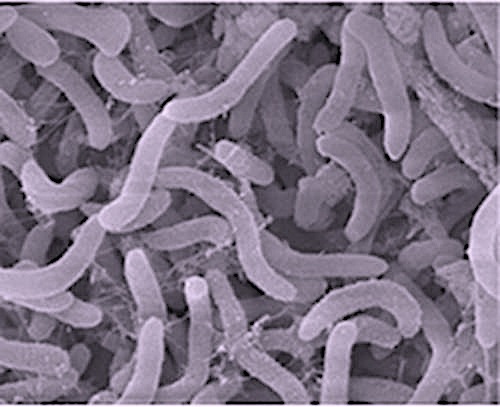

Scientific classification (Candidatus)
- Domain: Bacteria
- Phylum: Pseudomonadota
- Class: Alphaproteobacteria
- Order: Pelagibacterales
- Family: "Pelagibacteraceae"
- Genus: "Candidatus Pelagibacter" Rappé et al. 2002
- Species: "Ca. P. communis"

Binomial name
- "Candidatus Pelagibacter communis" corrig. Rappé et al. 2002

Synonyms
- "Candidatus Pelagibacter ubique" Rappé et al. 2002

= Pelagibacter communis =

"Candidatus Pelagibacter communis"

Species of bacterium

"Candidatus Pelagibacter", with the single species "Ca. P. communis", was isolated in 2002 and given a specific name, although it has not yet been described as required by the bacteriological code. It is an abundant member of the SAR11 clade in the phylum Alphaproteobacteria. SAR11 members are highly dominant organisms found in both salt and fresh water worldwide and were originally known only from their rRNA genes, first identified in the Sargasso Sea in 1990 by Stephen Giovannoni's laboratory at Oregon State University and later found in oceans worldwide. "Ca. P. communis" and its relatives may be the most abundant organisms in the ocean, and quite possibly the most abundant bacteria in the entire world. It can make up about 25% of all microbial plankton cells, and in the summer they may account for approximately half the cells present in temperate ocean surface water. The total abundance of "Ca. P. communis" and relatives is estimated to be about 2 × 10^{28} microbes.

It is rod or crescent-shaped and one of the smallest self-replicating cells known, with a length of 0.37–0.89 μm and a diameter of only 0.12–0.20 μm. The Pelagibacter genome takes up about 30% of the cell's volume. It is gram negative. It recycles dissolved organic carbon. It undergoes regular seasonal cycles in abundance—in summer reaching ~50% of the cells in the temperate ocean surface waters. Thus it plays a major role in the Earth's carbon cycle.

Its discovery was the subject of "Oceans of Microbes", Episode 5 of Intimate Strangers: Unseen Life on Earth by PBS.

== Cultivation ==
Several strains of "Candidatus Pelagibacter communis" have been cultured thanks to improved isolation techniques. The most studied strain is HTCC1062 (high-throughput cultivation collection).

The factors that regulate SAR11 populations are still largely unknown. They have sensors for nitrogen, phosphate, and iron limitation, and a very unusual requirement for reduced sulfur compounds. It is hypothesised that they have been molded by evolution in a low nutrient ecosystem, such as the Sargasso Sea where it was first discovered.

A population of "Ca. P. communis" cells can double every 29 hours, which is fairly slow, but they can replicate under low nutrient conditions.

"Ca. P. communis" can be grown on a defined, artificial medium with additions of reduced sulfur, glycine, pyruvate and vitamins.

== Genome ==
The genome of "Ca. P. communis" strain HTCC1062 was completely sequenced in 2005 showing that "Ca. P. communis" has the smallest genome (1,308,759 bp) of any free-living organism encoding only 1,354 open reading frames (1,389 genes total). The only species with smaller genomes are symbionts and parasites, such as Mycoplasma genitalium or Nanoarchaeum equitans It has the smallest number of open reading frames of any free living organism, and the shortest intergenic spacers, but it still has metabolic pathways for all 20 amino acids and most co-factors. Its genome has been streamlined. This streamlining concept is important because it reduces the amount of energy required for cell replication. "Ca. P. communis" saves energy by using the base pairs A and T (≈70.3% of all base pairs) because they contain less nitrogen, a resource that is hard for organisms to acquire.

Non-coding RNAs have been identified in "Ca. P. communis" through a bioinformatics screen of the published genome and metagenomic data. Examples of ncRNA found in these organisms include the SAM-V riboswitch, and other cis-regulatory elements like the rpsB motif. Another example of an important ncRNA in "Ca. P. communis" and other SAR11 clade members is a conserved, glycine-activated riboswitch on malate synthase, putatively leading to "functional auxotrophy" for glycine or glycine precursors in order to achieve optimal growth.

It is found to have proteorhodopsin genes, which help power light-mediated proton pumps. Subtle differences arise in the expression of its codon sequences when it is subjected to either light or dark treatments. More genes for oxidative phosphorylation are expressed when it is subjected to darkness.

== Name ==
The name of the genus (Pelagibacter) stems from the Latin neuter noun pelagus ("sea") combined with the suffix -bacter (rod, bacterium), to mean "bacterium of the sea". The connecting vowel is an "i" and not an "o", as the first term is the Latin "pelagus" and not the Greek original πέλαγος (pelagos) (the word pelagus is a Greek word used in Latin poetry, it is a 2nd declension noun with a Greek-like irregular nominative plural pelagē and not pelagi, the Greek word being a 3rd declension neuter in -ος (pl. -η) unrelated with 2nd declension latin words in -us). The name of the specific epithet (ubique) is a Latin adverb meaning "everywhere"; species with the status Candidatus are not validly published so do not have to be grammatically correct, such as having specific epithets having to be adjectives or nouns in apposition in the nominative case or genitive nouns according to rule 12c of the IBCN.

The term "Candidatus" is used for proposed species for which the lack of information prevents it from being a validated species according to the bacteriological code, such as deposition in two public cell repositories or lack of FAME analysis, whereas "Candidatus Pelagibacter communis" is not in ATCC and DSMZ, nor has analysis of lipids and quinones been conducted.

HTTC1062 is the type strain of the species "Ca. P. communis", which in turn is the type species of the genus "Candidatus Pelagibacter", which in turn is the type genus of the SAR11 clade or family "Pelagibacteraceae".

== Bacteriophage ==
It was reported in Nature in February 2013 that the bacteriophage HTVC010P, which attacks "Ca. P. communis", has been discovered and "it probably really is the commonest organism on the planet".

== See also ==
- Prochlorococcus
- Synechococcus
- Smallest organisms
