= Magnetococcus marinus =

Scientific classification
- Domain: Bacteria
- Kingdom: Pseudomonadati
- Phylum: Pseudomonadota
- Class: Magnetococcia
- Order: Magnetococcales
- Family: Magnetococcaceae
- Genus: Magnetococcus
- Species: M. marinus

Binomial name
- Magnetococcus marinus Bazylinski et al. 2013

Species of bacterium

Magnetococcus marinus is a species of Alphaproteobacteria that has the peculiar ability to form a structure called a magnetosome, a membrane-encased, single-magnetic-domain mineral crystal formed by biomineralisation, which allows the cells to orient along the Earth's geomagnetic field. The Magnetococcus marinus grows chemolithoautotrophically with thiosulfate and chemoorganoheterotrophically on acetate.

It is a basal group in the Alphaproteobacteria.
