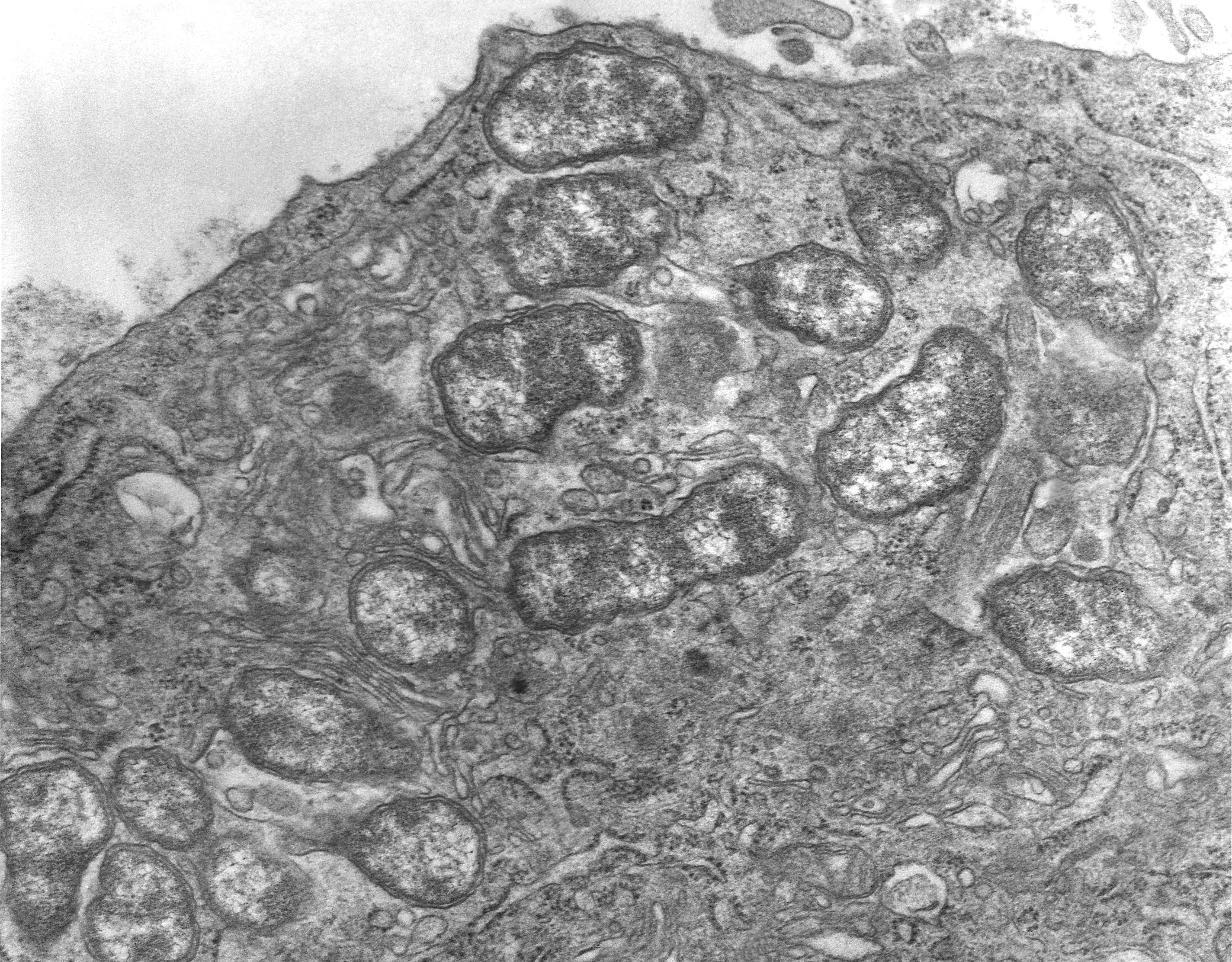
- Orientia tsutsugamushi

Scientific classification
- Domain: Bacteria
- Kingdom: Pseudomonadati
- Phylum: Pseudomonadota
- Class: Alphaproteobacteria
- Subclass: "Rickettsidae"
- Order: Rickettsiales
- Family: Rickettsiaceae
- Genus: Orientia

Species
- Orientia tsutsugamushi; Orientia chuto; Candidatus Orientia chiloensis

= Orientia =

Genus of bacteria

Orientia is a genus of bacteria in family Rickettsiaceae. They are obligate intracellular, gram-negative bacteria found in insects and mammals. They are spread through the bites or feces of infected insects.

The genus comprises the species Orientia tsutsugamushi and Orientia chuto, which both cause scrub typhus in humans.

== Candidatus Orientia chiloensis ==
Orientia chiloensis is a possible new species of Orientia identified as such by a highly divergent type-specific antigen gene.

In Chile scrub typhus is known to occur in the southern half of the country and in particular Chiloé Island and the fjords and channels of Patagonia. Between 2015 and 2020 there was a total of 40 known cases in Chile with much of the people affected reporting to work in gathering and cutting firewood. According to Chilean scientist Katia Abarca the disease in Chile corresponds to an endemic variety of the bacteria and has thus not arrived from the "Tsutsugamushi Triangle". The fact that the disease was first reported in 2006 in Chile is likely the result of under-diagnosis and underreporting. In January 2020, the disease was for the first time reported in Chile's southernmost region. Based on a study in northern Chiloé Island mites living in rodents are thought to be reservoirs and vectors of the disease.
