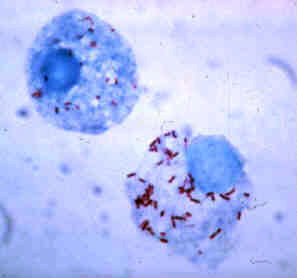
- Rickettsia rickettsii (red dots) in the cell of a deer tick

Scientific classification
- Domain: Bacteria
- Kingdom: Pseudomonadati
- Phylum: Pseudomonadota
- Class: Alphaproteobacteria
- Subclass: "Rickettsidae"
- Order: Rickettsiales
- Family: Rickettsiaceae; Pinkerton 1936 (Approved Lists 1980)

Tribes and genera
- "Candidatus Arcanobacter" Martijn et al. 2015; "Candidatus Cryptoprodota" corrig. Ferrantini et al. 2009; "Dermacentroxenus" Wolbach 1919; "Candidatus Gigarickettsia" Vannini et al. 2014* "Candidatus Hemipteriphilus" Bing et al. 2013; "Candidatus Megaira" Schrallhammer et al. 2013; Occidentia Mediannikov et al. 2017; Orientia Tamura et al. 1995; "Candidatus Phycorickettsia" Yurchenko et al. 2018; Rickettsia da Rocha-Lima 1916 (Approved Lists 1980); "Candidatus Sarmatiella" Castelli et al. 2021; "Candidatus Spectririckettsia" Castelli et al. 2019; "Candidatus Tisiphia" Davison et al. 2022; "Candidatus Trichorickettsia" Vannini et al. 2014; "Candidatus Xenohaliotis" Friedman et al. 2000

= Rickettsiaceae =

Family of bacteria

The Rickettsiaceae are a family of bacteria. The genus Rickettsia is the most prominent genus within the family. The bacteria that eventually formed the mitochondrion (an organelle in eukaryotic cells) is believed to have originated from this family. Most human pathogens in this family are in genus Rickettsia. They spend part of their lifecycle in the bodies of arthropods such as ticks or lice, and are then transmitted to humans or other mammals by the bite of the arthropod. It contains Gram-negative bacteria, very sensitive to environmental exposure, thus is adapted to obligate intracellular infection. Rickettsia rickettsii is considered the prototypical infectious organism in the group.

== Genomics ==
Comparative genomic analysis has identified three proteins, RP030, RP187 and RP192, which are uniquely found in members of the family Rickettsiaceae and serve as molecular markers for this family. In addition, conserved signature indels in a number of proteins including a four-amino-acid insert in transcription repair coupling factor Mfd, a 10-amino-acid insert in ribosomal protein L19, one-amino-acid inserts each in the FtsZ protein and the major sigma factor 70, and a one-amino-acid deletion in exonuclease VII protein that are specific for the Rickettsiaceae species have been identified.

Schematic ribosomal RNA phylogeny of Alphaproteobacteria

- Magnetococcidae
  Magnetococcus marinus
- - Caulobacteridae
    - Holosporales
    - Hyphomicrobiales, Rhodobacteraceae,
      Rhodospirillales, Sphingomonadales, etc.
  - Rickettsidae
    - Pelagibacterales
      - Pelagibacteraceae
        Pelagibacter
      - Subgroups Ib, II, IIIa, IIIb, IV and V
    - Rickettsiales
      - Proto-mitochondria
      - - Anaplasmataceae
          - Neorickettsia
          - - Wolbachia
            - - Anaplasma
              - Ehrlichia
        - - Midichloriaceae
            Midichloria
          - Rickettsiaceae
            - Orientia
            - Rickettsia

The cladogram of Rickettsidae has been inferred by Ferla et al. from the comparison of 16S + 23S ribosomal RNA sequences.
