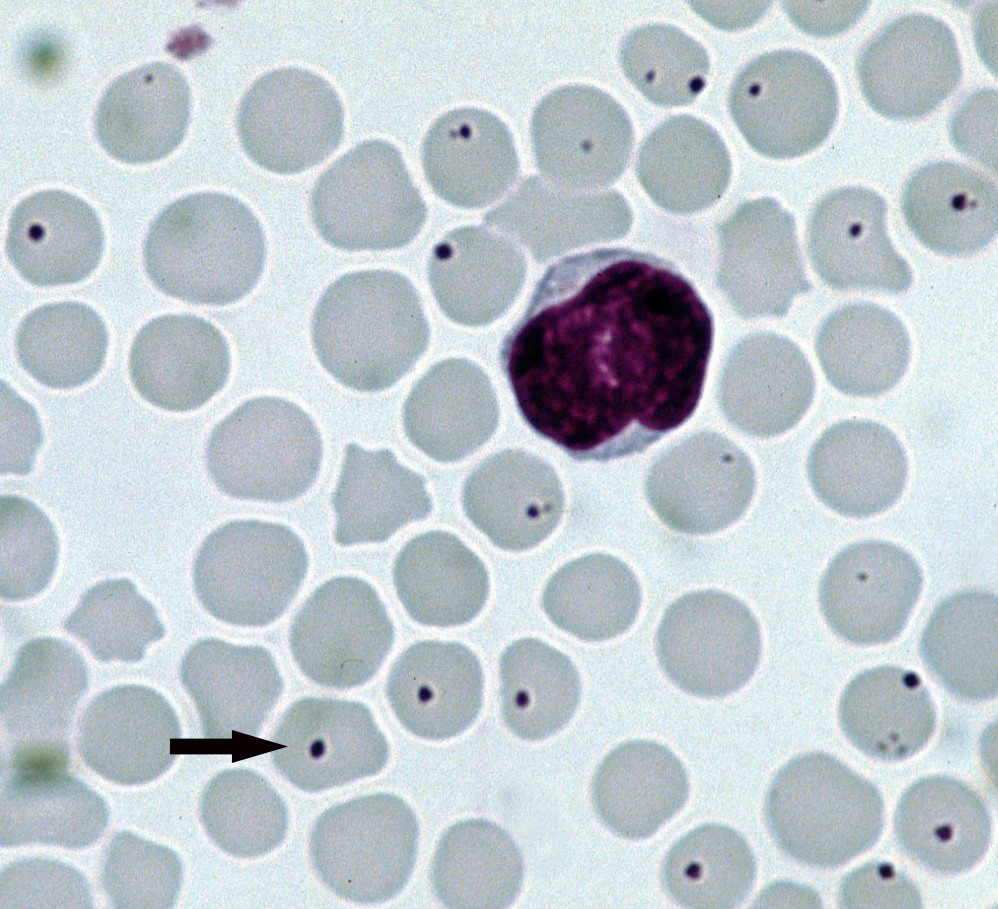
- The rickettsial bacterium Anaplasma centrale infecting red blood cells of a cow. Arrow points to typical infected cell.

Scientific classification
- Domain: Bacteria
- Kingdom: Pseudomonadati
- Phylum: Pseudomonadota
- Class: Alphaproteobacteria
- Subclass: "Rickettsidae"
- Order: Rickettsiales
- Family: Ehrlichiaceae; Moshkovski 1945 (Approved Lists 1980)

Genera
- Aegyptianella Carpano 1929 (Approved Lists 1980); Anaplasma Theiler 1910 (Approved Lists 1980); "Candidatus Cryptoplasma" Eshoo et al. 2015; Ehrlichia Moshkovski 1945 (Approved Lists 1980); Lyticum (ex Preer et al. 1974) Preer and Preer 1982; "Candidatus Neoehrlichia" Kawahara et al. 2004; Neorickettsia Philip et al. 1953 (Approved Lists 1980); "Paranaplasma" Kreier and Ristic 1963; Wolbachia Hertig 1936 (Approved Lists 1980)

Synonyms
- Anaplasmataceae Philip 1957 (Approved Lists 1980)

= Ehrlichiaceae =

Family of bacteria

The Ehrlichiaceae are a family of bacteria, included in the order Rickettsiales.

== Biology ==
Members of the family Ehrlichiaceae are small, Gram-negative, obligate intracellular bacteria in the order Rickettsiales. Like other rickettsial organisms, they replicate within membrane-bound compartments inside eukaryotic host cells and are adapted to survival in arthropod vectors and vertebrate hosts.

== Taxonomy ==
The family Ehrlichiaceae is a validly published family within the order Rickettsiales and includes the type genus Ehrlichia. Modern taxonomic treatments include several genera in this family, including Anaplasma, Ehrlichia, Neorickettsia, and Wolbachia, among others.

== Transmission ==
Many members of the family are transmitted by arthropods, especially ticks, and maintain enzootic cycles involving vertebrate reservoir hosts. Several species of medical and veterinary importance are vector-borne and infect blood cells or other host tissues after transmission by an infected arthropod.

== Medical and veterinary significance ==
The family includes organisms of substantial medical, veterinary, and agricultural importance. Pathogenic members include species of Ehrlichia and Anaplasma, which cause ehrlichioses and anaplasmoses in humans and other animals, while other members such as Wolbachia are important endosymbionts of arthropods and filarial nematodes rather than primary vertebrate pathogens.
