= Holosporales =

Scientific classification
- Domain: Bacteria
- Kingdom: Pseudomonadati
- Phylum: Pseudomonadota
- Class: Alphaproteobacteria
- Subclass: Caulobacteridae
- Order: Holosporales; Szokoli et al. 2020

Families
- "Caedimonadaceae" Schrallhammer et al. 2018; "Candidatus Hepatincolaceae" Szokoli et al. 2016; Holosporaceae Görtz and Schmidt 2006; "Candidatus Paracaedibacteraceae" Hess et al. 2016

Family of bacteria

Holosporales is an order of bacteria.
