= Magnetococcales =

Scientific classification
- Domain: Bacteria
- Kingdom: Pseudomonadati
- Phylum: Pseudomonadota
- Class: Magnetococcia; Chuvochina et al., 2024
- Order: Magnetococcales; Bazylinski et al., 2013

Type genus
- Magnetococcus; Bazylinski et al., 2013

Families
- "Ca. Magnetaquicoccaceae" Koziaeva et al., 2019; Magnetococcaceae Bazylinski et al., 2013

Order of bacteria

The Magnetococcales were an order of Alphaproteobacteria, but now the mitochondria are considered as sister to the alphaproteobactera, together forming the sister the marineproteo1 group, together forming the sister to Magnetococcidae.

- Proteobacteria
  - Magnetococcales
    - "Ca. Magnetaquicoccaceae" Koziaeva et al. 2019
    - Magnetococcaceae Bazylinski et al. 2013
  - - MarineProteo1
    - - Mitochondria
      - Alphaproteobacteria
