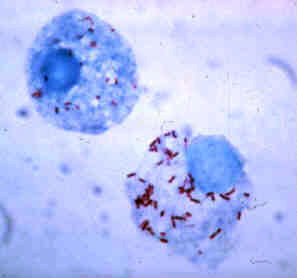
- Rickettsia rickettsii (red dots) in the cell of a deer tick

Scientific classification
- Domain: Bacteria
- Kingdom: Pseudomonadati
- Phylum: Pseudomonadota
- Class: Alphaproteobacteria
- Subclass: "Rickettsidae"
- Order: Rickettsiales; Gieszczykiewicz 1939 (Approved Lists 1980)

Families
- "Candidatus Deianiraeaceae" Castelli et al. 2019; Ehrlichiaceae Moshkovski 1945 (Approved Lists 1980); "Candidatus Midichloriaceae" Montagna et al. 2013; Rickettsiaceae Pinkerton 1936 (Approved Lists 1980); "Candidatus Tenuibacteraceae" Kroer et al. 2016; Genera incertae sedis; "Candidatus Anadelfobacter veles" Vannini et al. 2010; "Candidatus Repentibacter" corrig. Prokopchuk et al. 2019; "Sinorickettsia" Li et al. 2021

= Rickettsiales =

Order of bacteria

The Rickettsiales, informally called rickettsias, are an order of small Alphaproteobacteria. They are obligate intracellular parasites, and some are notable pathogens, including Rickettsia, which causes a variety of diseases in humans, and Ehrlichia, which causes diseases in livestock. Another genus of well-known Rickettsiales is the Wolbachia, which infect about two-thirds of all arthropods and nearly all filarial nematodes. Genetic studies support the endosymbiotic theory according to which mitochondria and related organelles developed from members of this group. However, more recent examination has suggested that the mitochondria and Rickettsiales diverged independently.

The Rickettsiales are difficult to culture, as they rely on living eukaryotic host cells for their survival.

== Rickettsiales phylogeny ==
The Rickettsiales further consist of three known families, the Rickettsiaceae, the Midichloriaceae, and the Ehrlichiaceae. Most studies also support the inclusion of the Holosporaceae, but one study has challenged this view. In that alternative, the Holosporaceae are the sole representatives of their own order, the Holosporales, and as such not part of the Rickettsiales (see the schematic tree below). Other lineages, not clearly part of any family, have been described, as well. Examples include Candidatus Arcanobacter lacustris and Rickettsiales bacterium Ac37b.

Schematic ribosomal RNA phylogeny of Alphaproteobacteria

- Magnetococcidae
  Magnetococcus marinus
- - Caulobacteridae
    - Holosporales
    - Hyphomicrobiales, Rhodobacteraceae,
      Rhodospirillales, Sphingomonadales, etc.
  - Rickettsidae
    - Pelagibacterales
      - Pelagibacteraceae
        Pelagibacter
      - Subgroups Ib, II, IIIa, IIIb, IV and V
    - Rickettsiales
      - Proto-mitochondria
      - - Anaplasmataceae
          - Neorickettsia
          - - Wolbachia
            - - Anaplasma
              - Ehrlichia
        - - Midichloriaceae
            Midichloria
          - Rickettsiaceae
            - Orientia
            - Rickettsia

The cladogram of Rickettsidae has been inferred by Ferla et al. from the comparison of 16S + 23S ribosomal RNA sequences.

=== Phylogenetic relationship between Rickettsiales and Pelagibacterales (SAR11) ===
The phylogenetic relationship between these two groups has yet to reach consensus in the scientific literature.

Early reports suggested that they represented sister clades to each other. However, later studies suggested that this relationship is false and was due to a phylogenetic artefact, which artificially groups independent AT-rich and fast-evolving lineages (Rickettsiales and Pelagibacterales have both properties) together. Upon correcting for this artefact, the Pelagibacterales form a sister clade to the Hyphomicrobiales, Rhodobacterales and Caulobacterales instead.

Another study adheres to the sister relationship between the two clades (see schematic tree). In their classification, the relation between the two orders is retained in the subclass, the Rickettsidae, which include the Rickettsiales, the Pelagibacteriales, and the extinct protomitochondrion (mitochondria themselves are not bacteria, but organelles).

== Reductive evolution ==
Rickettsiales genomes are undergoing reductive evolution and are typically small (generally < 1.5 Mbp), AT-rich (generally < 40% GC) with a low coding density (generally < 85%) and a relatively high number of pseudogenes. Reduction in genome size, % GC and coding density and genes are generally attributed to genetic drift and Muller's ratchet. Genetic drift is enhanced in Rickettsiales genomes due to low population sizes (given their endosymbiotic nature) and frequent population bottlenecks. Similarly, Muller's ratchet is activated through the lack of recombination and horizontal gene transfer (the eukaryotic host cell is a natural barrier).
