= Ehrlichiosis ewingii infection =

Human ewingii ehrlichiosis
- Specialty: Infectious disease

Ehrlichiosis ewingii infection is an infectious disease caused by an intracellular bacteria, Ehrlichia ewingii. The infection is transmitted to humans by the tick, Amblyomma americanum. This tick can also transmit Ehrlichia chaffeensis, the bacteria that causes human monocytic ehrlichiosis (HME).

== Signs and symptoms ==
Patients can present with fever, headache, myalgias, and malaise. Laboratory tests may reveal a low number of platelets in the blood, low levels of white blood cells in the bloodstream, and evidence of liver damage.

== Mechanism ==
Humans contract the disease after a bite by an infected tick of the species Amblyomma americanum. Those with an underlying immunodeficiency (such as HIV) appear to be at greater risk of contracting the disease. Compared to HME, ewingii ehrlichiosis has a decreased incidence of complications.

Like Anaplasma phagocytophilum, the causative agent of human granulocytic ehrlichiosis, Ehrlichia ewingii infects neutrophils. Infection with E. ewingii may delay neutrophil apoptosis.

== Diagnosis ==
In endemic areas, a high index of suspicion is warranted, especially with a known tick exposure. The diagnosis can be confirmed by using PCR. A peripheral blood smear can also be examined for intracytoplasmic inclusions called morulae.

== Treatment ==
Doxycycline is the treatment of choice for suspected Ehrlichia ewingii infection in adults and children of all ages, and treatment should be started as soon as ehrlichiosis is suspected rather than delayed pending laboratory confirmation.

== See also ==
- Human monocytic ehrlichiosis
- Human granulocytic ehrlichiosis
- Ehrlichiosis (canine)
