= Ehrlichiosis =

Infection transmitted by ticks

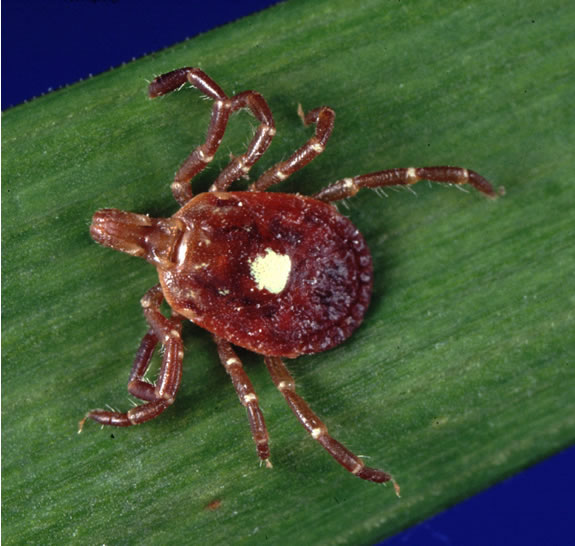
- The lone star tick, which is one of three ticks that can spread Ehrlichiosis. It is characterized by the white dot on its back.
- Specialty: Infectious diseases
- Symptoms: Fever, chills, severe headaches, muscle aches, nausea, vomiting, diarrhea, loss of appetite, confusion, splotchy or pinpoint rash
- Complications: Brain or nervous system damage, respiratory failure, uncontrollable bleeding, organ failure, death
- Causes: Bite from an infected tick
- Risk factors: Age, being immunocompromised, having received an organ transplant, certain medications

Ehrlichiosis is a tick-borne bacterial infection, caused by bacteria of the family Anaplasmataceae, genera Ehrlichia and Anaplasma. These obligate intracellular bacteria infect and kill white blood cells.

The average reported annual incidence is 2.3 cases per million people.

== Types ==
Six (see note below) species have been shown to cause human infection:

- Anaplasma phagocytophilum causes Human granulocytic anaplasmosis. A. phagocytophilum is endemic to New England and the north-central and Pacific regions of the United States.
- Ehrlichia ewingii causes human ewingii ehrlichiosis. E. ewingii primarily infects deer and dogs (see Ehrlichiosis (canine)). E. ewingii is most common in the south-central and southeastern states.
- Ehrlichia chaffeensis causes human monocytic ehrlichiosis. E. chaffeensis is most common in the south-central and southeastern states.
- Ehrlichia canis
- Neorickettsia sennetsu
- Ehrlichia muris eauclairensis

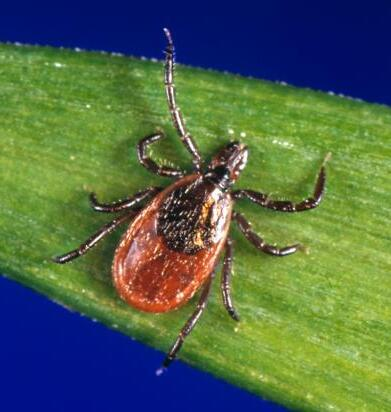
Ixodes scapularis is another type of tick that can spread Ehrlichiosis muris eauclairensis.

The latter three infections are not well studied. Ehrlichia muris eauclairensis was recently discovered and has low reporting numbers because it is relatively new, and its symptoms resemble the symptoms caused by other Ehrlichia bacteria.

In 2008, human infection by a Panola Mountain (in Georgia, US) Ehrlichia species was reported. On August 3, 2011, infection by a yet-unnamed bacterium in the genus Ehrlichia was reported, carried by deer ticks and causing flu-like symptoms in at least 25 people in Minnesota and Wisconsin. Until then, human ehrlichiosis was thought to be very rare or absent in both states. The new species, which is genetically very similar to an Ehrlichia species found in Eastern Europe and Japan called E. muris, was identified at a Mayo Clinic Health System hospital in Eau Claire.

Ehrlichia species are transported between cells through the host cell filopodia during the initial stages of infection; whereas, in the final stages of infection, the pathogen ruptures the host cell membrane.

== Signs and symptoms in humans ==
Specific symptoms include fever, chills, severe headaches, muscle aches, nausea, vomiting, diarrhea, loss of appetite, confusion, and a splotchy or pinpoint rash. More severe symptoms include brain or nervous system damage, respiratory failure, uncontrollable bleeding, organ failure, and death. Ehrlichiosis can also blunt the immune system by suppressing production of TNF-alpha, which may lead to opportunistic infections such as candidiasis.

Most of the signs and symptoms of ehrlichiosis can likely be ascribed to the immune dysregulation that it causes. A "toxic shock-like" syndrome is seen in some severe cases of ehrlichiosis. Some cases can present with purpura and in one such case, the organisms were present in such overwhelming numbers that in 1991, Dr. Aileen Marty of the AFIP was able to demonstrate the bacteria in human tissues using standard stains, and later proved that the organisms were indeed Ehrlichia using immunoperoxidase stains.

Experiments in mouse models further support this hypothesis, as mice lacking TNF-alpha I/II receptors are resistant to liver injury caused by Ehrlichia infection.

About 3% of human monocytic ehrlichiosis cases result in death; however, these deaths occur "most commonly in immunosuppressed individuals who develop respiratory distress syndrome, hepatitis, or opportunistic nosocomial infections."

== Signs and symptoms in dogs ==
Ehrlichiosis in dogs exhibits obvious symptoms in the later part of the infection. This is why some symptoms are already severe when diagnosed. There are three stages of Ehrlichia infection: the acute (or the early stage), sub-clinical (symptoms are not yet evident), and clinical or chronic (symptoms are obvious and long-standing). The chronic form of ehrlichiosis appears to occur more commonly in German Shepherds than in other breeds.

Dogs infected with Ehrlichia often show lameness, lethargy, enlarged lymph nodes, and loss of appetite during the acute phase, which is one to three weeks after infection. Other symptoms include cough, diarrhea, vomiting, abnormal bruising and/or bleeding, fever, and loss of balance.

Dogs with this disease can develop anemia and/or a low platelet count, which can eventually result in bleeding or blindness. Some doctors also check for arthritis-like symptoms, where the dogs cannot stand on one foot or more because of sore joints. Urinalysis may also be done on the dog to check if the kidneys are infected with the disease.

== Prevention ==
No human vaccine is available for ehrlichiosis. Tick control is the main preventive measure against the disease. However, in late 2012, a breakthrough in the prevention of canine monocytic ehrlichiosis was announced when a vaccine was serendipitiously discovered by Prof. Shimon Harrus, Dean of the Hebrew University of Jerusalem's Koret School of Veterinary Medicine.

Measures of tick bite prevention include staying out of tall grassy areas that ticks tend to live in, treating clothes and gear that a tick could jump on, using EPA approved bug repellent, tick checks for all humans, animals, and gear that potentially came into contact with a tick, and showering soon after being in an area that ticks might also be in.

Veterinarians advise dog owners to eliminate ticks and fleas by using products like Advantix, Frontline Plus, Vectra 3D, or Bravecto to prevent tick bites and ehrlichiosis. Oral chewable options include Nexgard, Simparica, Credelio, or Bravecto.

== Treatment ==
Doxycycline and other tetracyclines are the medications of choice. For patients (human or nonhuman) allergic to and/or intolerant of antibiotics of the tetracycline class, chloramphenicol and rifampin are alternative treatment options.

Since a decline in platelets may also be evident in patients with this disease, Euphorbia hirta (the so-called asthma-plant) can also be a supplemental treatment. This plant (or medicines which have this ingredient) helps with the increase of platelets.

== Epidemiology ==
Ehrlichiosis is a nationally notifiable disease in the United States. Cases have been reported in every month of the year, but most cases are reported during April–September. These months are also the peak months for tick activity in the United States. The majority of cases of Ehrlichiosis tend to be in the United States. The states affected most include "the southeastern and south-central United States, from the East Coast extending westward to Texas."

Since the first case of Ehrlichiosis was reported in 2000, cases reported to the CDC have increased. For example, in 2000, 200 cases were reported, and in 2019, 2,093 cases were reported. Fortunately, the "proportion of ehrlichiosis patients that died as a result of infection" has gone down since 2000.

From 2008 to 2012, the average yearly incidence of ehrlichiosis was 3.2 cases per million persons. This is more than twice the estimated incidence for 2000–2007. The incidence rate increases with age, with the ages of 60–69 years being the highest age-specific years. Children less than 10 years and adults aged 70 years and older have the highest case-fatality rates. A documented higher risk of death exists among immunosuppressed persons.

== See also ==
- Ehrlichia Wisconsin HM543746
