= Ehrlichia Wisconsin HM543746 =

Tick-borne bacterium

Ehrlichia Wisconsin HM543746 is an unnamed tick bacterium that spread through Minnesota and Wisconsin in 2009 and is similar to Ehrlichia muris.

Researchers took more than 4000 blood samples from people who appeared to have ehrlichiosis or anaplasmosis, and used 697 ticks from both states as test subjects. The researchers, working at the Mayo Clinic, used molecular methods, culturing, and serological testing. The research was conducted after technologist Carol Werner noticed an unnatural Ehrlichia polymerase chain reaction result. The investigation arrived at the discovery of the new bacterium because the research showed that four of the patients were infected by a new bacterium; their symptoms in 2009 including fevers, headaches, fatigue, nausea, and vomiting. All four of the patients survived by being treated with doxycycline.

The results were published in The New England Journal of Medicine and brought up in a Health Alert Network public health announcement. The lead researcher, Bobbi Pritt, said, "Before this report, human ehrlichiosis was thought to be very rare or absent in Minnesota and Wisconsin, therefore, physicians might not know to look for Ehrlichia infections at all." Entomologist Susan Paskewitz said that owing to the increase of deer ticks in Wisconsin, there may be further incidents of this bacterium infecting people. Before the discovery, the tick bacteria Ehrlichia chaffeensis and Ehrlichia ewingii were believed to be the only causes of ehrlichiosis in the United States.
