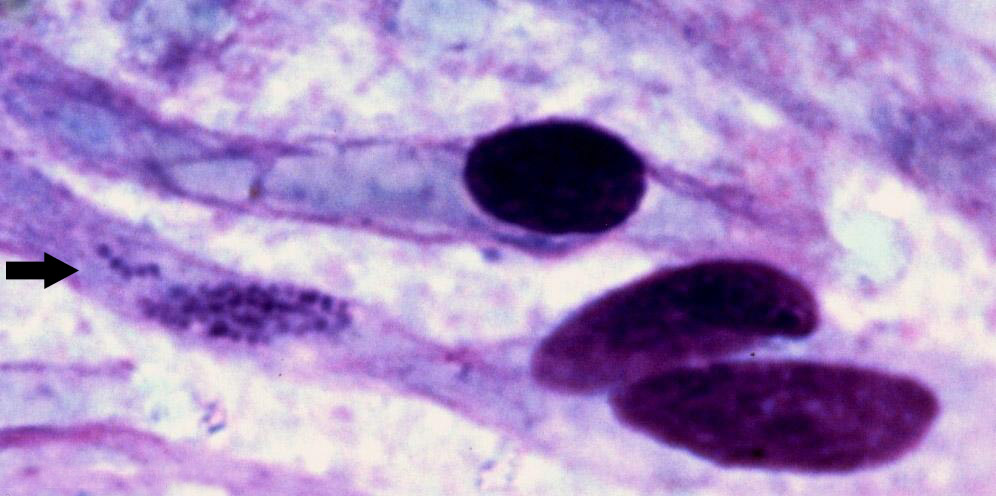
- Ehrlichia ruminantium bacteria within cell of brain of sheep that died of heartwater in Africa.

Scientific classification
- Domain: Bacteria
- Kingdom: Pseudomonadati
- Phylum: Pseudomonadota
- Class: Alphaproteobacteria
- Order: Rickettsiales
- Family: Ehrlichiaceae
- Genus: Ehrlichia
- Species: E. ruminantium

Binomial name
- Ehrlichia ruminantium (Cowdry 1925) Dumler et al. 2001

Synonyms
- Cowdria ruminantium (Cowdry 1925) Moshkovski 1947 (Approved Lists 1980)

= Ehrlichia ruminantium =

Ruminant disease

Heartwater (also known as cowdriosis, nintas, and ehrlichiosis) is a tick-borne rickettsial disease. The name is derived from the fact that fluid can collect around the heart or in the lungs of infected animals. It is caused by Ehrlichia ruminantium (formerly Cowdria ruminantium)—an intracellular Gram-negative coccal bacterium (also referred to as Rickettsia ruminantium). The disease is spread by various Amblyomma ticks and has a large economic impact on cattle production in affected areas. There are four documented manifestations of the disease. These are acute, peracute, and subacute, and a mild form is known as heartwater fever. There are reports of zoonotic infections of humans by E. ruminantium, similar to other Ehrlichia species, such as those that cause human ehrlichiosis.

== History ==
Heartwater disease was first described in 1838 within the personal journal of Louis Trichardt, a Voortrekker in South Africa. In Trichardt's notes, he recorded that a majority of the surrounding sheep died approximately three weeks after a large tick infestation was observed.

In an 1877 testimony to the Cape of Good Hope Commission on Diseases of Sheep and Goats, livestock producer J. Webb testified that the appearance of ticks on his farm 8 or 9 years earlier corresponded with an onset of fatal disease in his livestock. Webb reported opening the chest of the victims and discovering the "heart bag" to be full of "water."

Heartwater first reached the Caribbean islands in 1980.

== Distribution ==
The disease is common in sub-Saharan Africa, but can ultimately be found wherever Amblyomma ticks are present. Major areas of concern for the disease also include Madagascar, Mauritius, Zanzibar, the Comoros Islands, and Sao Tomé. Heartwater has been observed on three of the Caribbean islands: Guadeloupe, Marie-Galante, and Antigua.

In the Caribbean, at least, the cattle egret has been implicated in the spread of heartwater since it colonized the islands in the 1950s.

== Hosts ==
Nearly all members of Bovidae are susceptible to this disease but vary in their susceptibility, with Zebu and Water buffalo appearing to be most resistant. The most susceptible species to heartwater appears to be the various goats. The South African buffalo, blesbok, black wildebeest, helmeted guinea fowl, leopard tortoise and scrub hare are known to host heartwater without symptoms and act as a tick reservoir.

=== Experimental hosts ===
In laboratory experiments, non-ruminants such as ferrets, laboratory mice, and four-striped grass mice have demonstrated susceptibility to the disease.

== Clinical signs ==
Clinical disease is more common in young animals and non-native breeds. The clinical signs of disease are caused by an increased vascular permeability and consequent oedema and hypovolemia.

The symptoms include neurological signs such as tremors and head pressing, respiratory signs such as coughing and nasal discharge, and systemic signs such as fever and loss of appetite. Physical examination may reveal petechiae of the mucous membranes, tachycardia, and muffled heart sounds. Heartwater can also cause reproductive and gastrointestinal disease. It is frequently fatal.

== Diagnosis ==
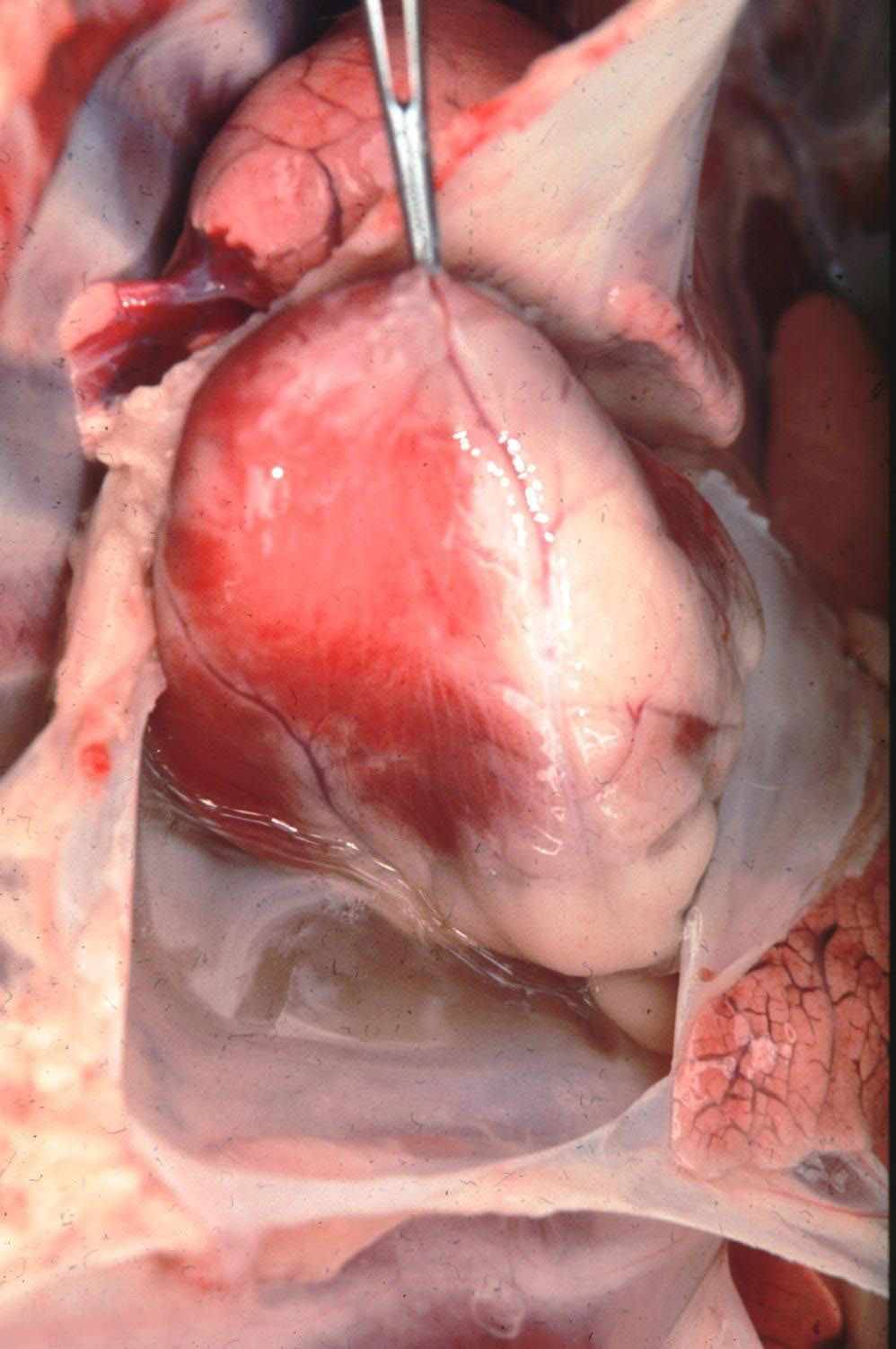
Oedematous pericardium of a goat that died of heartwater disease, caused by infection with Ehrlichia ruminantium, transmitted by Amblyomma ticks in Africa and Caribbean

On post mortem examination, a light yellow transudate that coagulates on exposure to air is often found within the thorax, pericardium, and abdomen. Most fatal cases have the hydropericardium that gives the disease its common name. Pulmonary oedema and mucosal congestion are regularly seen along with frothy fluid in the airways and cut surfaces of the lungs. To definitively diagnose the disease, C. ruminantium must be demonstrated either in preparations of the hippocampus under Giemsa staining or by histopathology of the brain or kidney.

== Treatment and control ==
During the early stages of disease, animals may be treated with sulfonamides and tetracyclines. In advanced disease, prognosis is poor. Tetracyclines can also be used prophylactically when animals are introduced into an area endemic with heartwater. Ectoparasiticides, used as dips, can be used to reduce the animal's exposure to bont ticks. In areas endemic for heartwater, the use of dips against other ticks of domestic animals, such as Rhipicephalus (Boophilus) and Hyalomma species, is likely, and this will usually contribute to control of vectors of E. ruminantium.

=== Vaccines ===
A live blood vaccine is available for the protection of young stock. Animals may require treatment for the disease after vaccination. Several experimental vaccines are currently being developed; examples include attenuated, recombinant, and multi-epitope DNA vaccines.

== Mortality ==
Depending on the species of the animal, the mortality rate of the disease may vary from 5% to 90%. Mortality rates appear to be the highest within the various sheep and goat species, but this is not always the case, as some sheep species, such as the Afrikaner have mortality rates only reaching as high as 6%.

== Global status ==
Heartwater is notifiable to the World Organization for Animal Health.

=== United States ===
The U.S. Department of Agriculture believes that an outbreak in the U.S. could cost the livestock industry up to $762 million in losses annually. The tick that carries the disease is thought to be capable of being transported by migratory birds from the Caribbean to at least Florida. The U.S. has prepared an in-depth response plan to mitigate damages and contain any detected spread.

== See also ==
- Zoonosis

== Additional references ==
- "Heartwater" (PDF). Center for Food Security and Public Health. Iowa State University. 2015.
- "Heartwater - Cowdriosis" (PDF). World Organisation for Animal Health (OIE). 2009.
