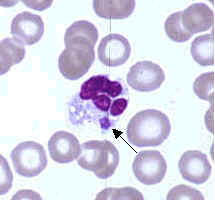
- Ehrlichia ewingii

Scientific classification
- Domain: Bacteria
- Kingdom: Pseudomonadati
- Phylum: Pseudomonadota
- Class: Alphaproteobacteria
- Order: Rickettsiales
- Family: Ehrlichiaceae
- Genus: Ehrlichia; Moshkovski 1945 (Approved Lists 1980)

Species
- See text

Synonyms
- Cowdria Moshkovski 1947 (Approved Lists 1980)

= Ehrlichia =

Genus of bacteria

Ehrlichia is a genus of Rickettsiales bacteria that are transmitted to vertebrates by ticks. These bacteria cause the disease ehrlichiosis, which is considered zoonotic, because the main reservoirs for the disease are animals.

Ehrlichia species are obligately intracellular pathogens and are transported between cells through the host cell filopodia during initial stages of infection, whereas in the final stages of infection, the pathogen ruptures the host cell membrane.

== History ==
The genus Ehrlichia is named after German microbiologist Paul Ehrlich. The first ehrlichial disease was recognized in South Africa during the 19th century. Its tick-borne nature was determined in 1900. The organism itself was demonstrated in 1925 when it was recognized to be a Rickettsia. It was initially named Rickettsia ruminantium, and is currently named Ehrlichia ruminantium. In 1945, an "infection and treatment" method for livestock was developed. This is still the only commercially available "vaccine" against the disease, which is not a true vaccine, but intentional exposure to the disease with monitoring and antibiotic treatment if needed. In 1985, the organism was first propagated reliably in tissue culture. A new species of Ehrlichia was discovered inside the deer tick Ixodes scapularis. This newly found organism has been isolated only from deer ticks in Wisconsin and Minnesota in the USA. The species is known as Ehrlichia Wisconsin HM543746.

== Species ==
=== Accepted species ===
The following species have been effectively and validly published:

- Ehrlichia canis (Donatien and Lestoquard 1935) Moshkovski 1945 (Approved Lists 1980)
- Ehrlichia chaffeensis Anderson et al. 1992
- Ehrlichia ewingii Anderson et al. 1992
- Ehrlichia minasensis Cabezas-Cruz et al. 2016
- Ehrlichia muris Wen et al. 1995
- Ehrlichia risticii Holland et al. 1985
- Ehrlichia ruminantium (Cowdry 1925) Dumler et al. 2001
- Ehrlichia sennetsu (Misao and Kobayashi 1956) Ristic and Huxsoll 1984

=== Provisional species ===
The following species have been published, but are not valid according to the Bacteriological Code:

- "Ehrlichia japonica" Lin et al. 2021
- "Ehrlichia ovina" Moshkovski 1945
- "Ehrlichia platys" French and Harvey 1983

=== Candidatus species ===
The following species have been published as candidatus species:

- "Candidatus Ehrlichia corsicanum" Cicculli et al. 2020
- "Candidatus Ehrlichia khabarensis" Rar et al. 2015
- "Candidatus Ehrlichia occidentalis" Gofton et al. 2017
- "Candidatus Ehrlichia ornithorhynchi" Gofton et al. 2018
- "Candidatus Ehrlichia ovata" Lynn et al. 2019
- "Candidatus Ehrlichia rustica" Ehounoud et al. 2016
- "Candidatus Ehrlichia senegalensis" Dahmana et al. 2020
- "Candidatus Ehrlichia shimanensis" Kawahara et al. 2006
- "Candidatus Ehrlichia urmitei" Ehounoud et al. 2016
- "Candidatus Ehrlichia walkeri" corrig. Brouqui et al. 2003

== Evolution ==
The Ehrlichia genome contains many different variants of genes that encode outer membrane proteins, which have gone through intense modification over long periods of time. The great diversity in outer membrane protein genes is thought to originate from gene duplication events, followed by the fusion and fission of resulting paralogs of the gene. These duplication, fusion, and fission events form multiple gene copies and fragments, which are able to accumulate mutations. These copies and fragments of membrane proteins can then recombine, through a process called gene conversion, resulting in a new gene variant. This has a profound effect on the fitness of an organism. The survival of Ehrlichia depends greatly on the immune response of its host. With a higher range of outer membrane proteins, the parasite can evade the immune system of the host more effectively and establish persistent infection.

The most pronounced evidence of evolution in the genome size of Erhlichia is the presence of tandem repeats, which vary highly among individuals and species. Over time, individuals may expand or contract parts of their genes and alleles, which adds genetic variation and may sometimes affect phenotype.

Ehrlichia and its closely related genus Anaplasma show extreme diversity in the structure and content of their genomes. This diversity is direct result of rare clones with extreme genomes that emerged by chance after repeated bottleneck events, and this diversity persists because of the lack of selective constraints on rapid growth inside the host tissue.

=== Ehrlichia ruminantium ===
The evolutionary changes in the outer membrane proteins have led to the emergence of new strains that can infect a larger variety of hosts. Heartwater, caused by E. ruminantium, is a prevalent tick-borne disease of livestock in Africa and the Caribbean, but also threatens the American mainland. Three strains have arisen from this species due to evolutionary change in their genomes. When sequencing their genomes, many active genomic modifications have occurred, such as high substitution rates, truncated genes, and the presence of pseudogenes and tandem repeats. When analyzing substitution rates between the three strains in 888 orthologous coding DNA sequences, three coding DNA sequences were biased towards nonsynonymous substitutions that affect phenotype. In contrast, 181 coding DNA sequences were biased towards synonymous substitutions, which do not affect phenotype. This indicates that selection pressure to maintain protein function existed, and this selection acted against the nonsynonymous mutations.

=== Ehrlichia canis ===
Ehrlichia canis is a small, obligate-intracellular, tick-transmitted, Gram-negative α-proteobacterium. This species is responsible for the globally distributed canine monocytic ehrlichiosis. E. canis also shows evolution in its complex membrane structures and immune evasion strategies. These evolutionary features are derived traits that do not show up in the previous lineages, which may indicate that these features may have contributed to a fitness advantage that kept this lineage going. Unique glycoproteins and major outer membrane proteins can be expressed variously using 25 different genes. The glycoproteins are important targets of the host immune response, attachment to the host cell, and other features in the immune response. The more outer-membrane protein genes that can be expressed, the higher the chance the organism can avoid being recognized by the host's immune system.

Also, reductive evolution is present in E. canis. The genome has had a severe loss of metabolic pathway enzymes compared to its ancestors. Reductive evolution in obligate intracellular pathogens is usually the direct result of genetic drift in small populations, low recombination rates, and high mutation rates. The host metabolic pathway enzymes take control of the functions lost due to reductive evolution, and this contributes to its need for a host. Natural selection may not be the reason for small genomes.

== Epidemiology ==
Despite there being multiple strains of ehrlichiosis, only two species, E. chaffeensis and E. ewingii, are currently known to cause the disease in humans.

Amblyomma americanum ticks spread E. chaffeensis and E. ewingii bacterial infection in the Eastern and Southeastern United States, while A. phagocytophilum is spread by the Ixodes scapularis tick in the Upper Midwest; 1,518 cases of E. chaffeensis were recorded in southeastern, south-central and mid-Atlantic areas of the country in 2013. Despite the first cases of "E. ewingii" appearing in the Missouri in the year 1999, this strain was not reportable to health officials until 2008. Since 2008, there have been reported human cases of E. ewingii in Oklahoma, Arkansas and Tennessee though it is observed less frequently than E. chaffeensis.

During 2008–2012, 4,613 cases of E. chaffeensis infections were reported through the National Notifiable Diseases Surveillance System (NNDSS). The incidence rate (IR) was 3.2 cases per million person-years (PYs). The hospitalization rate (HR) was 57% and the case fatality rate (CFR) was 1%. During that same time, 55 cases of E. ewingii infections were reported through NNDSS. The national IR was 0.04 cases per million PY. The HR was 77% and the case fatality rate was 0%.

In Minnesota and Wisconsin, four people reported symptoms that are associated with ehrlichiosis, and upon further research, neither of these cases was found to be E. chaffeensis or E. ewingii, but instead it was revealed as a new species, similar in genetic makeup to E. muris. Ixodes scapularis ticks are hypothesized to be the transmitting vector of the E. muris strain in these states.
