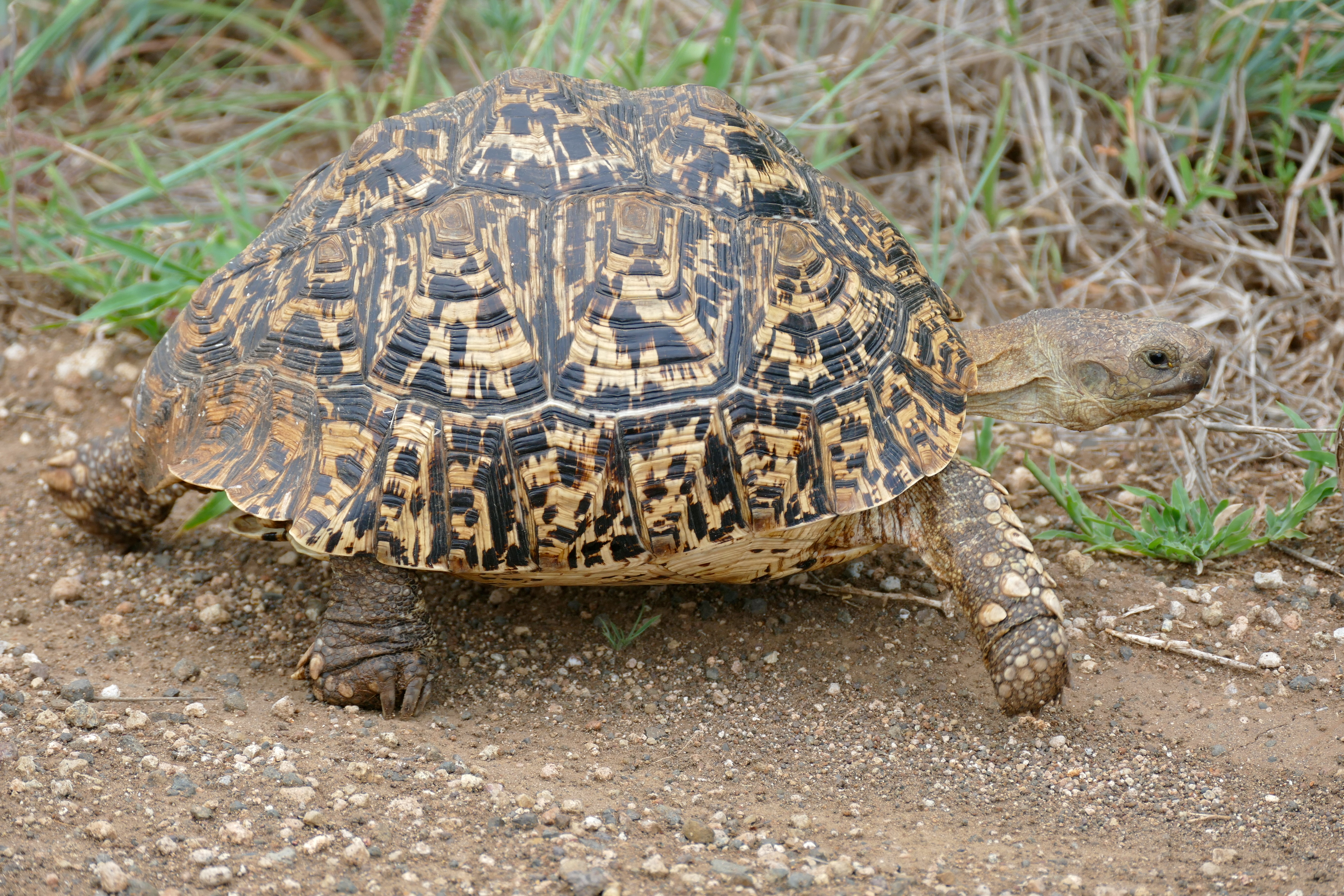
- At Kruger National Park, South Africa

Conservation status
- Least Concern (IUCN 3.1)
- CITES Appendix II

Scientific classification
- Kingdom: Animalia
- Phylum: Chordata
- Class: Reptilia
- Order: Testudines
- Suborder: Cryptodira
- Family: Testudinidae
- Genus: Stigmochelys
- Species: S. pardalis

Binomial name
- Stigmochelys pardalis (Bell, 1828)

Synonyms
- Synonyms: Testudo pardalis Bell, 1828; Testudo biguttata Cuvier, 1829 (nomen nudum); Testudo armata Boie, 1831 (nomen nudum); Testudo bipunctata Gray, 1831; Geochelone (Geochelone) pardalis — Fitzinger, 1835; Megachersine pardalis — Hewitt, 1933; Testudo pardalis pardalis — Loveridge, 1935; Geochelone pardalis pardalis — Loveridge & E. Williams, 1957; Stigmochelys pardalis — Gerlach, 2001; Centrochelys pardalis pardalis — Vetter, 2002; Stigmochelys pardalis pardalis — Bour, 2002; Psammobates pardalis — Le, Raxworthy, McCord & Mertz, 2006; Testudo pardalis babcocki Loveridge, 1935; Geochelone pardalis babcocki — Loveridge & E. Williams, 1957; Geochelone babcocki — Pritchard, 1967; Geochelone paradalis babcocki — Dadd, 1974; Geochelone pardalis baboocki Młynarski, 1976 (ex errore); Centrochelys pardalis babcocki — Vetter, 2002; Stigmochelys pardalis babcocki — Bour, 2002; Geochelone pardalis babcockii Le, Raxworthy, McCord & Mertz, 2006 (ex errore)

= Leopard tortoise =

Species of tortoise

The leopard tortoise (Stigmochelys pardalis) is a large and attractively marked tortoise found in the savannas of eastern and southern Africa, from Sudan to the southern Cape Province. It is the only extant member of the genus Stigmochelys, although in the past, it was commonly placed in Geochelone. This tortoise is a grazing species that favors semiarid, thorny to grassland habitats. In both very hot and very cold weather, it may dwell in abandoned fox, jackal, or aardvark burrows. The leopard tortoise does not dig other than to make nests in which to lay eggs. Given its propensity for grassland habitats, it grazes extensively upon mixed grasses. It also favors succulents and thistles.

== Taxonomy and etymology ==
The phylogenic placement of the leopard tortoise has been subject to several revisions. Different authors have placed it in Geochelone (1957), Stigmochelys (2001), Centrochelys (2002), and Psammobates (2006). More recently, consensus appears to have settled on Stigmochelys, a monotypic genus. Considerable debate has occurred about the existence of two subspecies, S. p. pardalis and S. p. babcocki, but recent work does not support this distinction.

Stigmochelys is a combination of Greek words: stigma meaning "mark" or "point" and chelone meaning "tortoise". The specific name pardalis is from the Latin word pardus meaning "leopard" and refers to the leopard-like spots on the tortoise's shell.

== Description ==
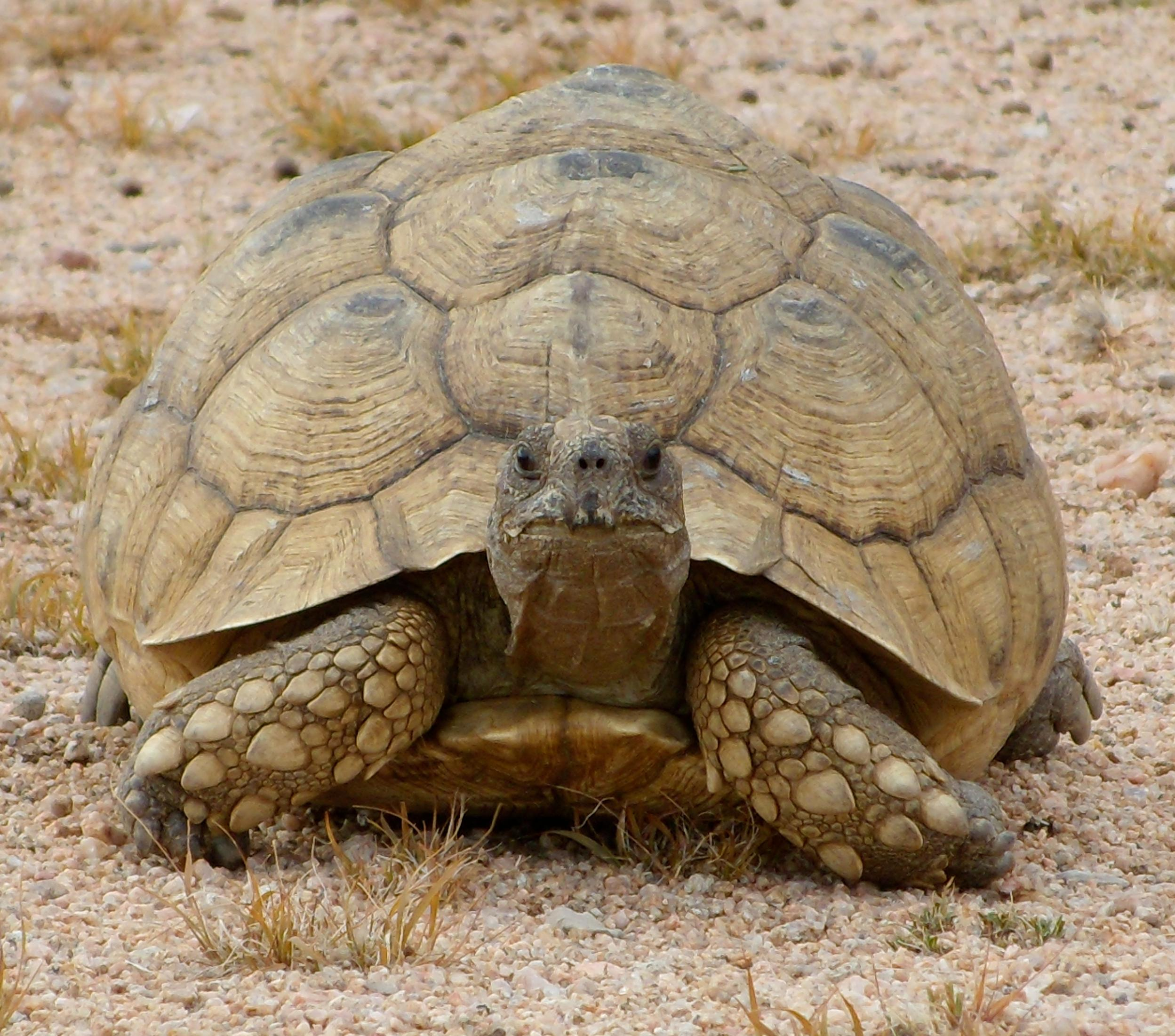
Shell patterns fade in mature specimens.

The leopard tortoise is the fourth-largest species of tortoise in the world, with typical adults reaching 40 cm (16 in) and weighing 13 kg (29 lb). Adults tend to be larger in the northern and southern ends of their range, where typical specimens weigh up to 20 kg (44 lb), and an exceptionally large tortoise may reach 70 cm (28 in) and weigh 40 kg (88 lb).

The carapace is high and domed with steep, almost vertical sides. Juveniles and young adults are attractively marked with black blotches, spots, or even dashes and stripes on a yellow background. In mature adults, the markings tend to fade to a nondescript brown or grey. The head and limbs are uniformly colored yellow, tan, or brown.

== Distribution and habitat ==
In Botswana

They are widely distributed across the arid and savanna regions of eastern and southern Africa, extending from South Sudan and Somalia, across East Africa, to South Africa and Namibia. The species is generally absent from the humid forest regions of Central Africa. Over this range, the leopard tortoise occupies the most varied habitats of any African tortoise, including grasslands, thorn-scrub, mesic brushland, and savannas. They can be found at altitudes ranging from sea level to 2,900 m (9,500 ft).

== Ecology and behavior ==
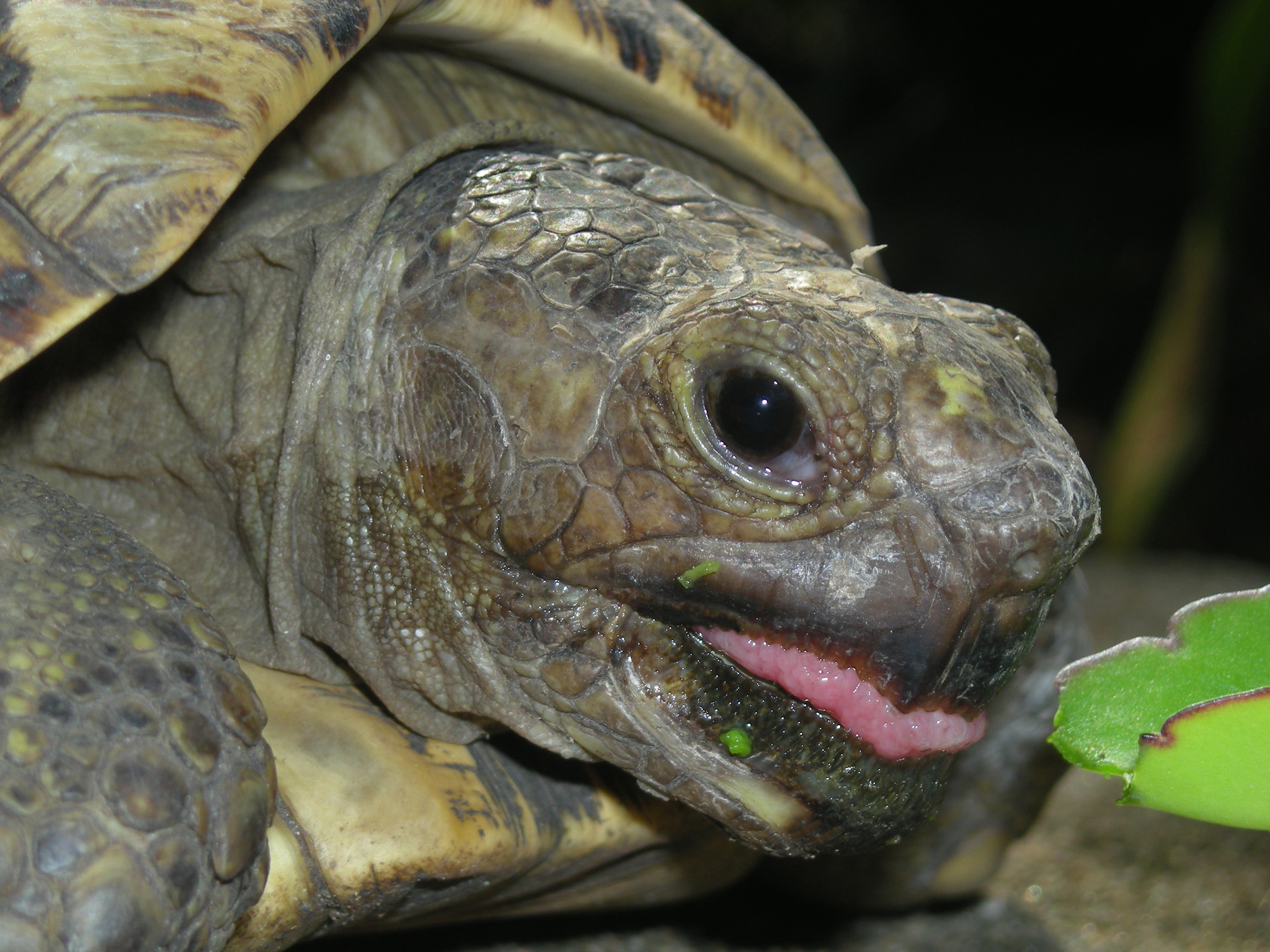
Leopard tortoise eating plant material

Leopard tortoise eating

Leopard tortoises are herbivorous; their diet consists of a wide variety of plants including forbs, thistles, grasses, and succulents. They consume berries and other fruits when available. They sometimes gnaw on bones or even ash and hyena feces to obtain calcium, necessary for bone development and their eggshells. Seeds can pass undigested through the gut, so the leopard tortoise plays a significant role in seed dispersal. Normally active during the day, they are less active during hot weather or during the dry season.

The leopard tortoise reaches sexual maturity between 12 and 15 years old, and may live as long as 80 to 100 years. During the mating season, males fight over females, ramming and butting their competitors. They trail after females for quite some distance, often ramming them into submission. When mating, the male makes grunting vocalizations. Nesting occurs between May and October when the female digs a hole and lays a clutch of five to 30 eggs. As many as five to seven clutches may be laid in a single season. Incubation takes 8–15 months depending on temperature. The numerous predators of the eggs and hatchlings include rock monitors, puff adders, jackals, and crows. Adults have few natural predators, but lions and hyenas have occasionally been reported preying on them.

== Conservation ==
The leopard tortoise is a widespread species and remains common throughout most of its range. Human activities, including agricultural burning, consumption, and especially commercial exploitation in the pet trade, are potential threats, but have not yet caused significant population declines. They are increasingly being bred in captivity for the pet trade. For example, most tortoises exported from Kenya and Tanzania originate in captive-breeding programs, alleviating collection from the wild.

The leopard tortoise has been listed in Appendix II of CITES since 1975, and in 2000, the United States banned their import because of the risk posed by heartwater, an infectious disease carried by tortoise ticks that could seriously impact the US livestock industry.

== Gallery ==
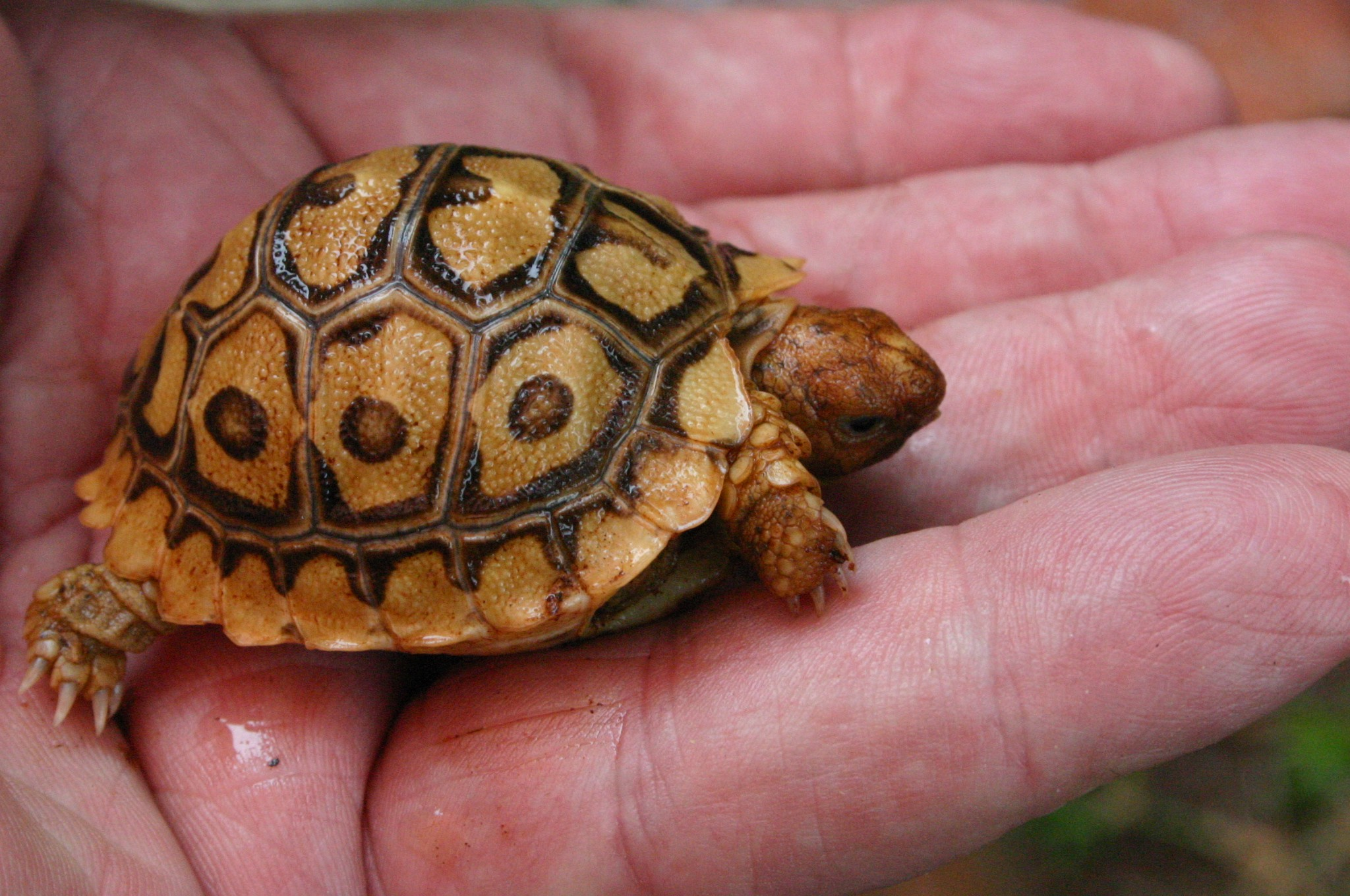
One-month-old hatchling

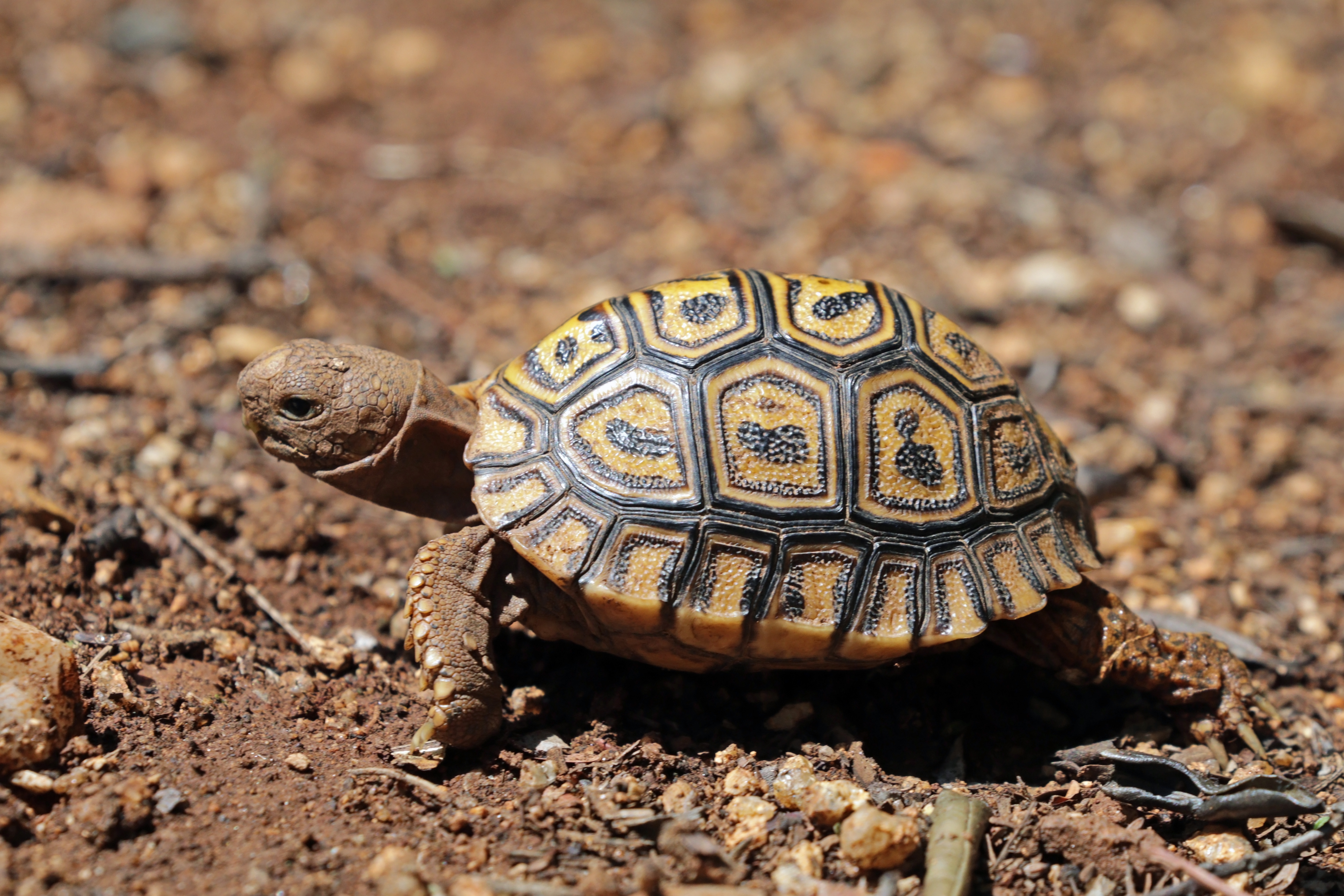
Juvenile

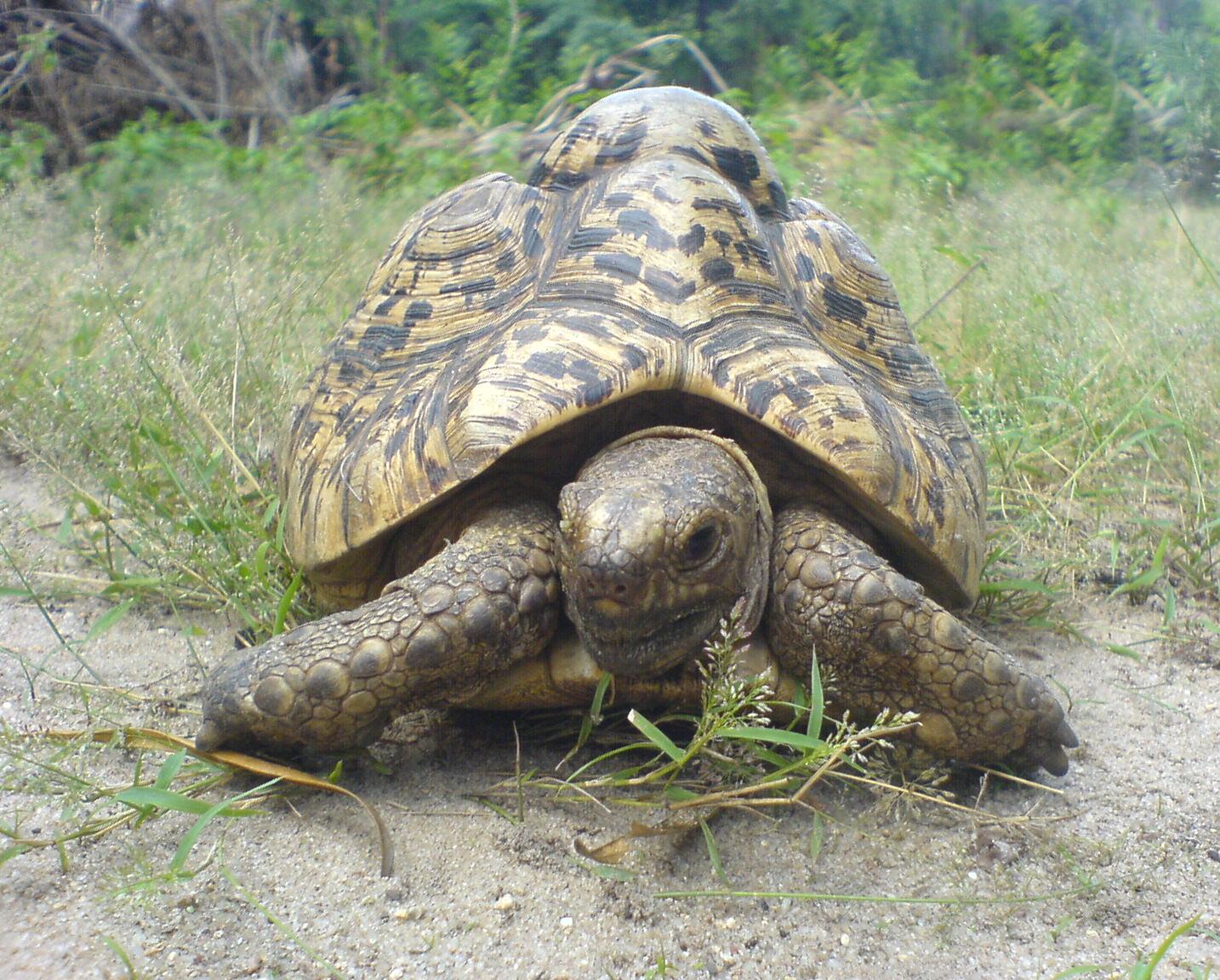
Small 20-year-old leopard tortoise eating

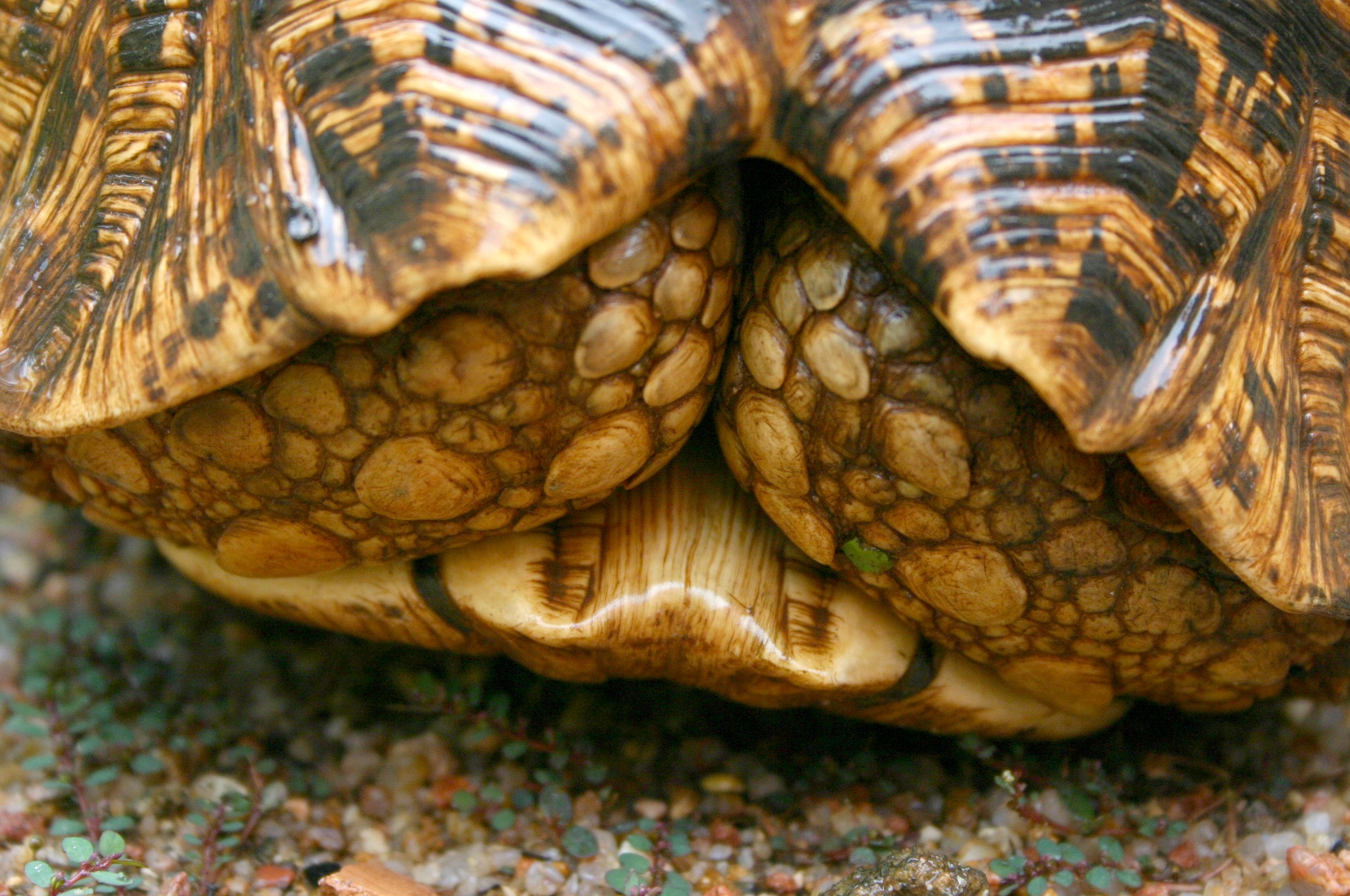
Retracted fore legs of adult female leopard tortoise

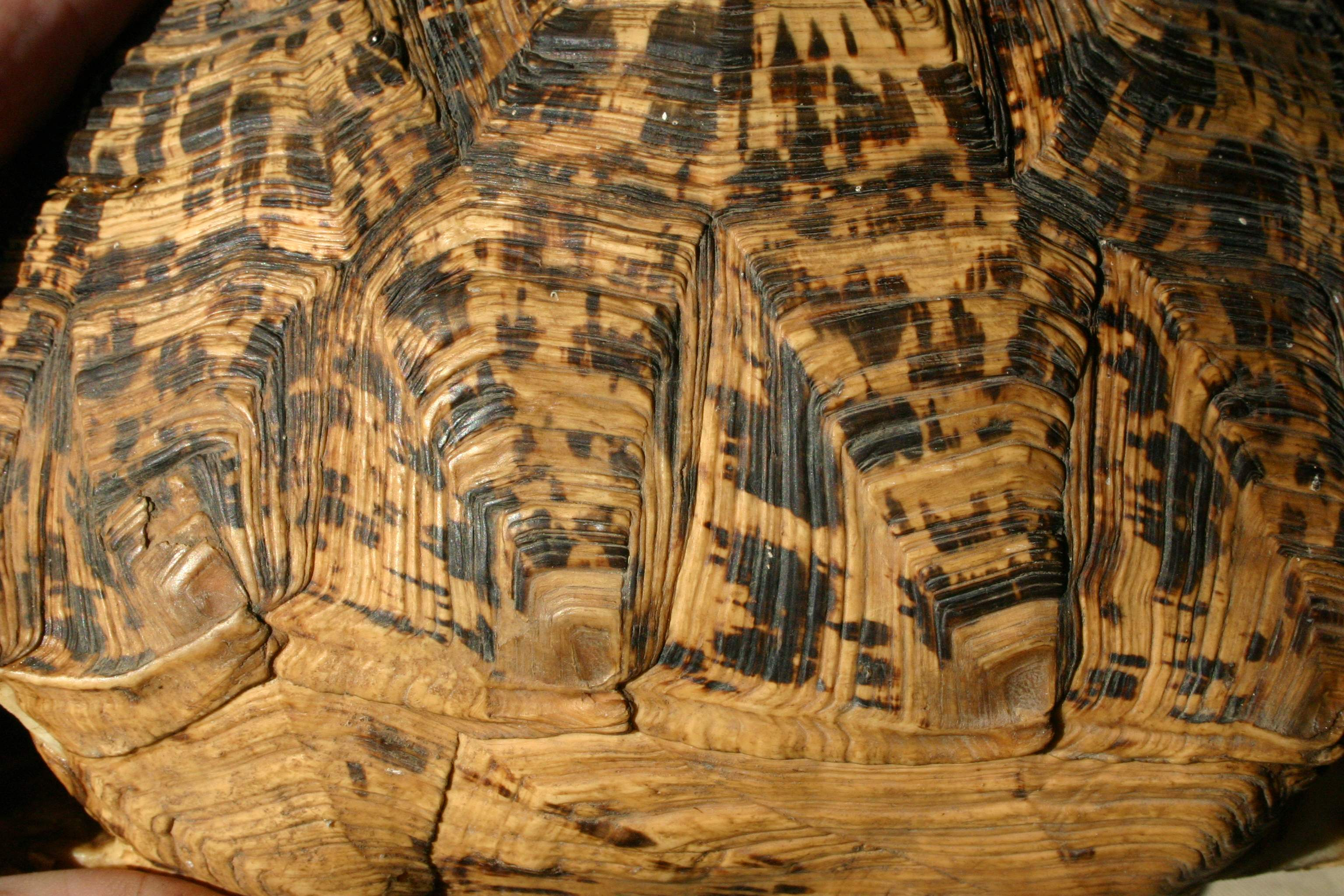
Close-up of scutes

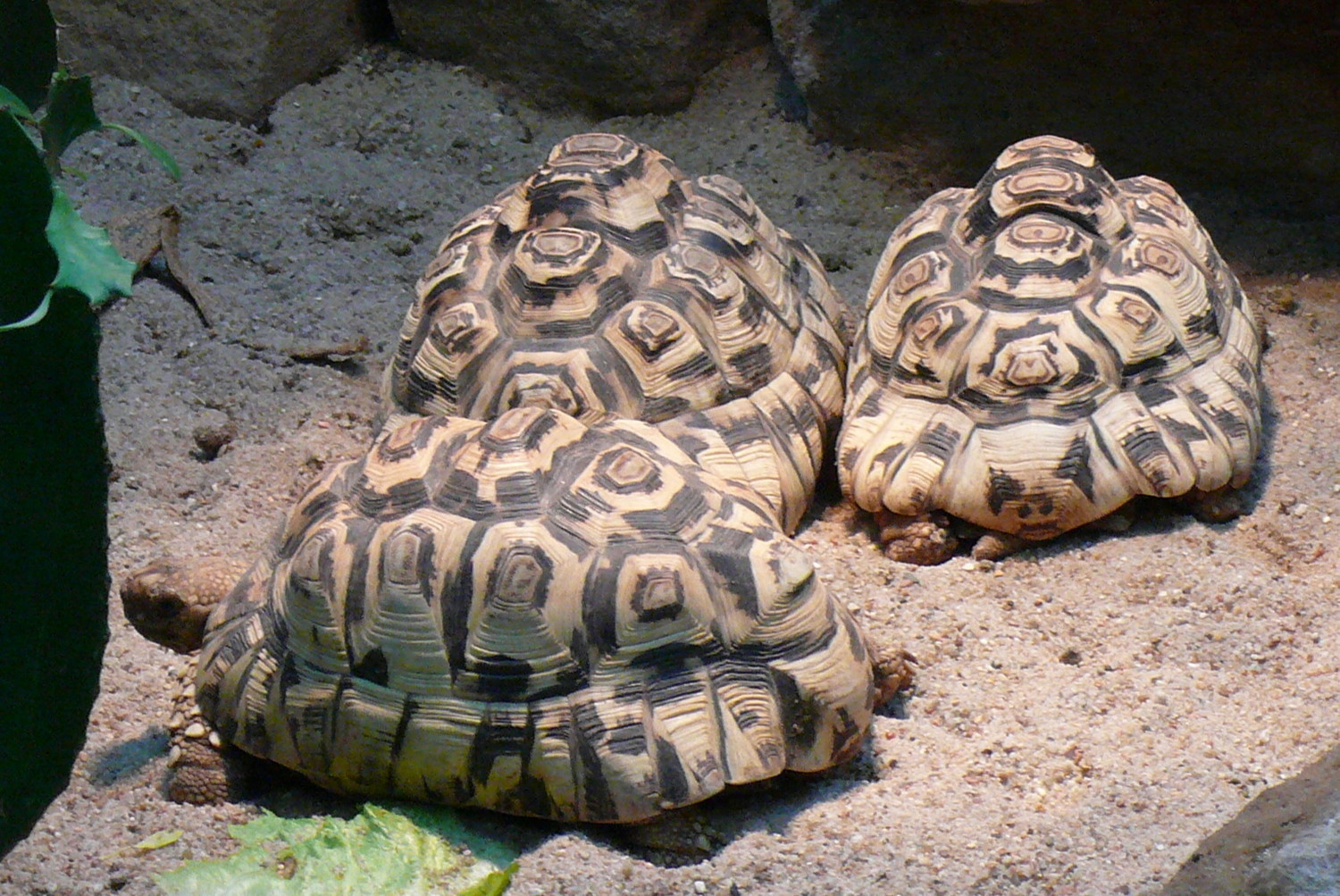
Three adult leopard tortoises

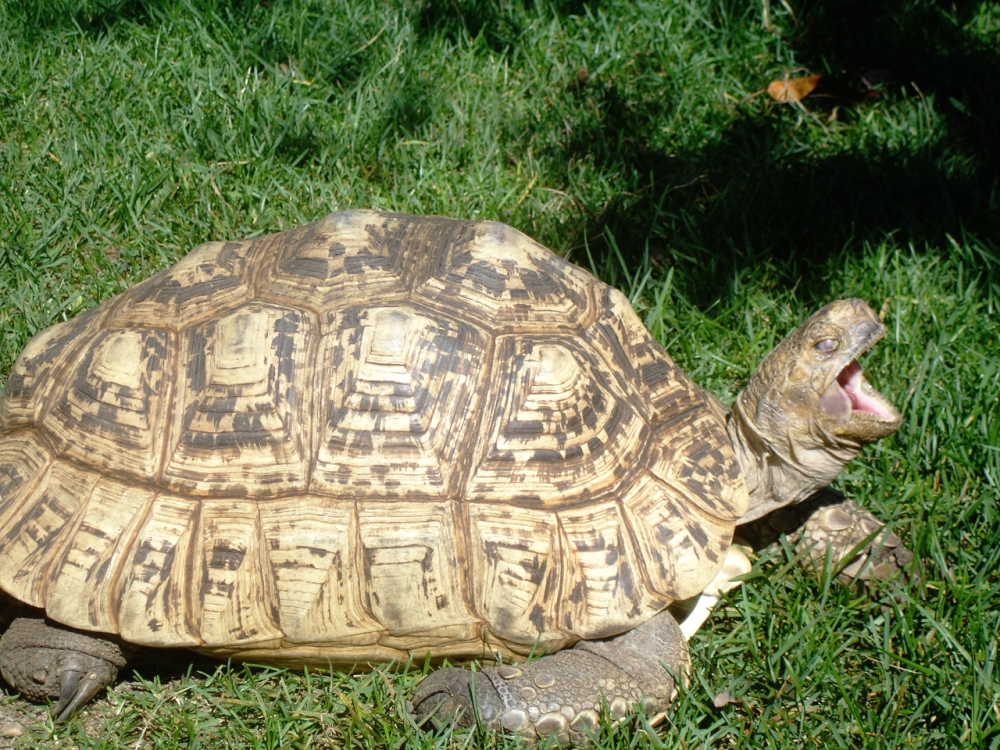
Mature adult (faded)

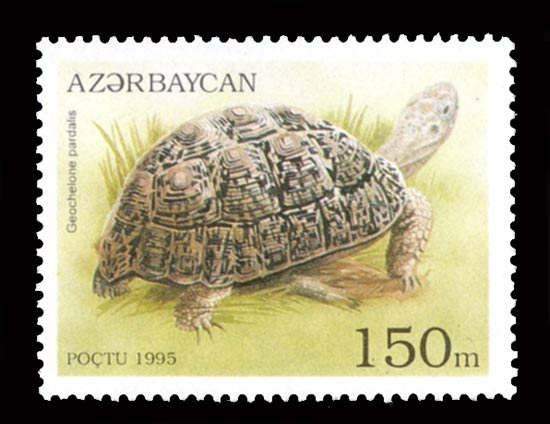
Leopard tortoise on Azerbaijan stamp

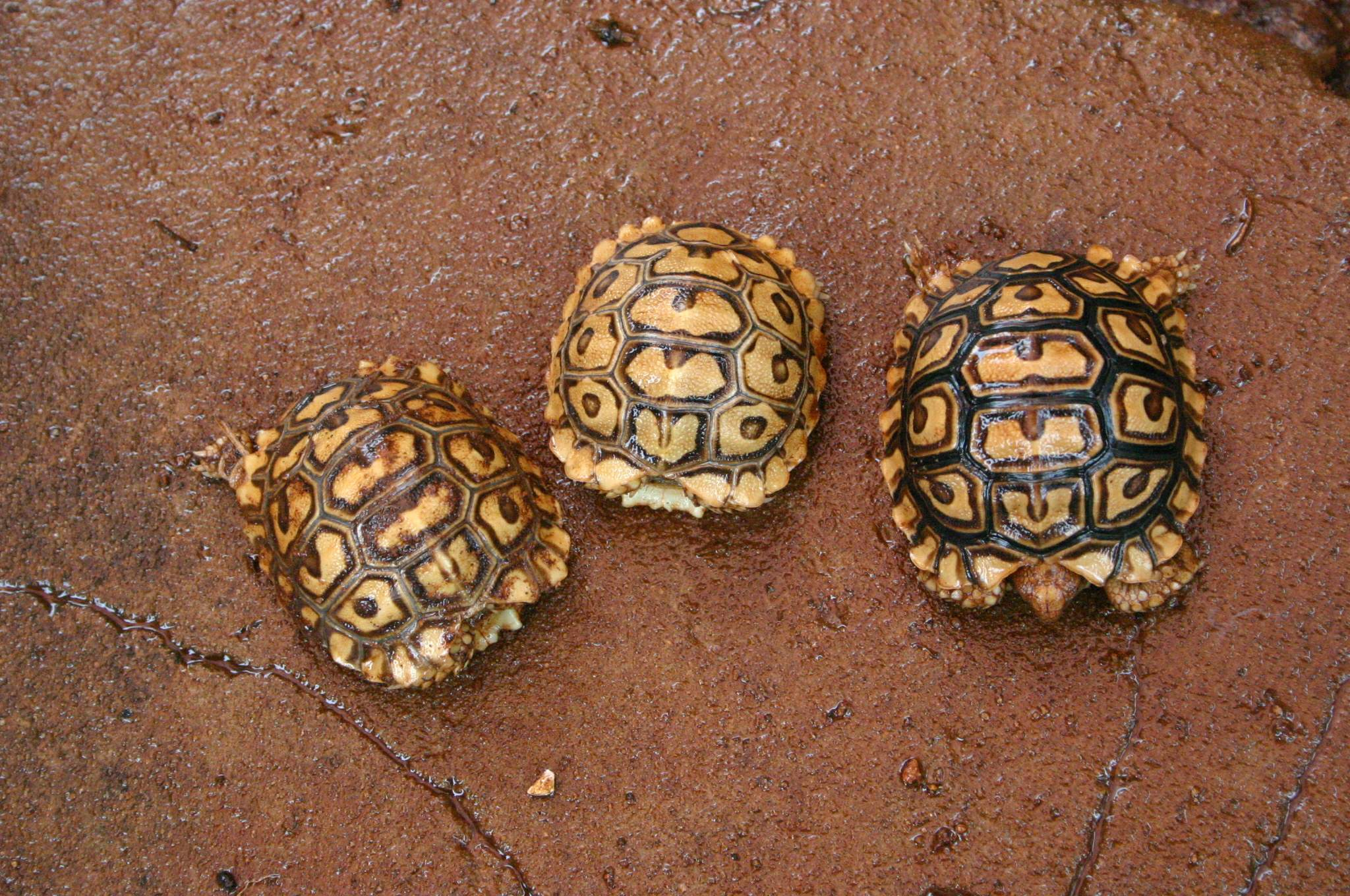
Three baby leopard tortoises

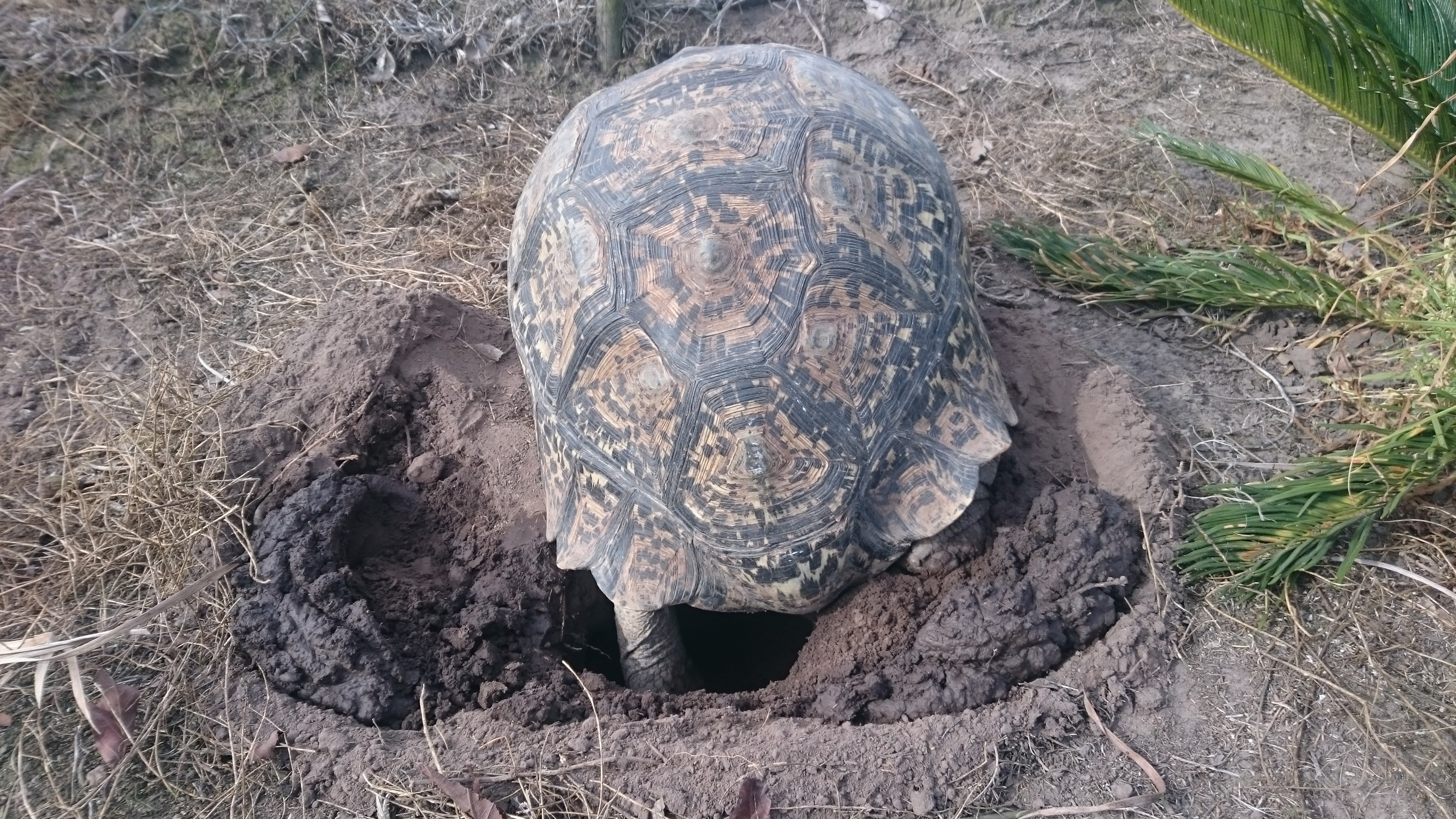
Leopard tortoise digging a hole to lay eggs

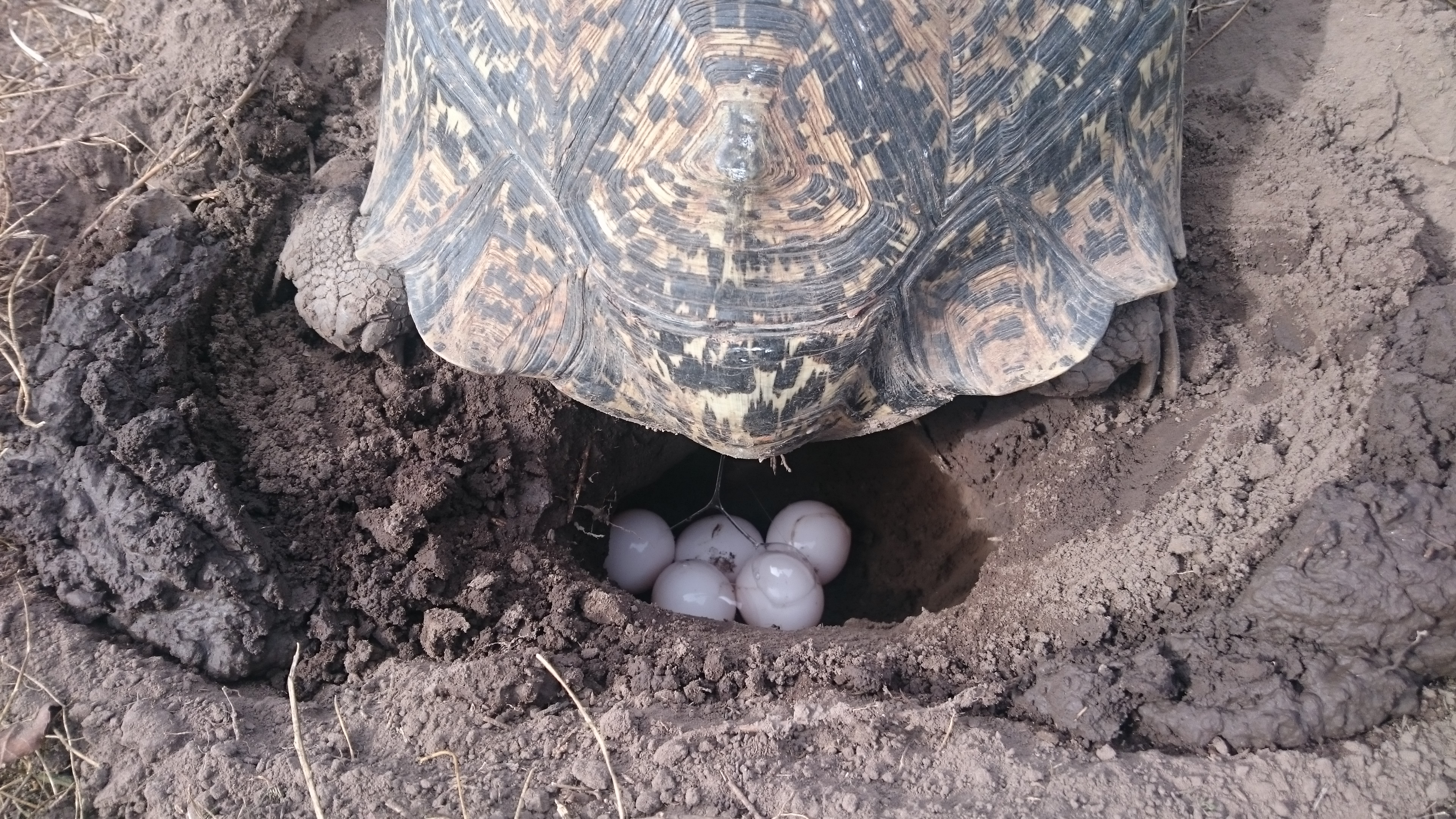
Leopard tortoise laying eggs

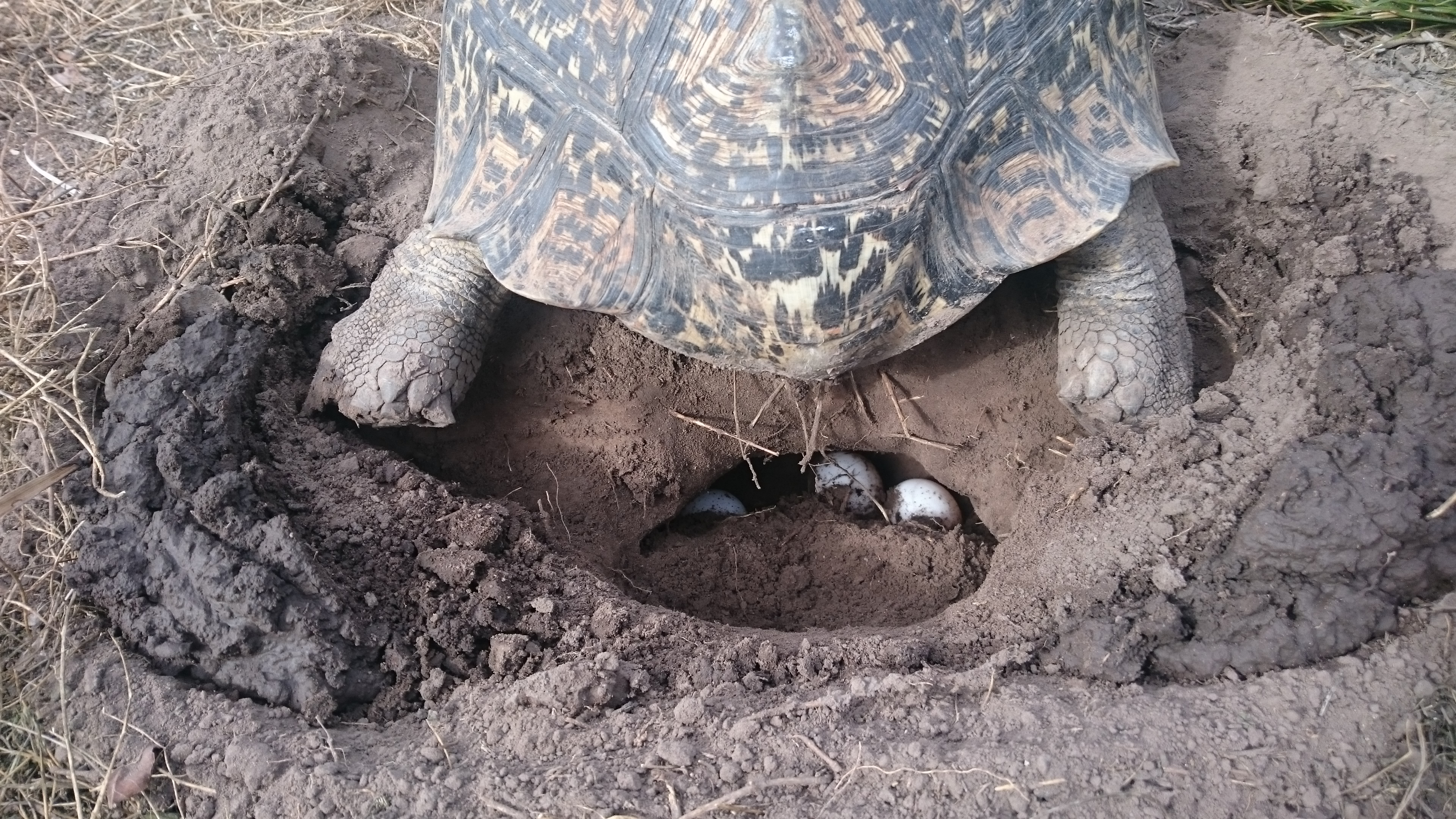
Leopard tortoise closing hole with eggs in
