= Human monocytotropic ehrlichiosis =

Human monocytic ehrlichiosis
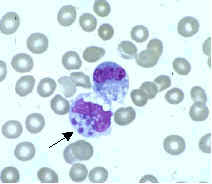
- Ehrlichia chaffeensis
- Specialty: Infectious diseases

Human monocytotropic ehrlichiosis is a form of ehrlichiosis associated with Ehrlichia chaffeensis. This bacterium is an obligate intracellular pathogen affecting monocytes and macrophages.

== Signs and symptoms ==
The most common symptoms are fever, headache, malaise, and muscle aches (myalgia). Compared to human granulocytic anaplasmosis, rash is more common. Laboratory abnormalities include thrombocytopenia, leukopenia, and elevated liver tests.

The severity of the illness can range from minor or asymptomatic to life-threatening. CNS involvement may occur. A serious septic or toxic shock-like picture can also develop, especially in patients with impaired immunity.

== Cause ==
Human monocytotropic ehrlichiosis is caused by infection with Ehrlichia chaffeensis, an obligate intracellular bacterium that primarily infects monocytes and macrophages. Humans usually acquire the infection through the bite of infected ticks, particularly the lone star tick (Amblyomma americanum) in the United States.

== Diagnosis ==
Tick exposure is often overlooked. For patients living in high-prevalence areas who spend time outdoors, a high degree of clinical suspicion should be employed. Ehrlichia serologies can be negative in the acute period. Polymerase chain reaction is therefore the laboratory diagnostic tool of choice.

== Treatment ==
If ehrlichiosis is suspected, treatment should not be delayed while waiting for a definitive laboratory confirmation, as prompt doxycycline therapy has been associated with improved outcomes. Doxycycline is the treatment of choice.

Presentation during early pregnancy can complicate treatment. Rifampin has been used in pregnancy and in patients allergic to doxycycline.

== Epidemiology ==
In the US, human monocytotropic ehrlichiosis occurs across the south-central, southeastern, and mid-Atlantic states, regions where both the white-tailed deer (Odocoileus virginianus) and its ectoparasite, Lone Star ticks (Amblyomma americanum), thrive.

Human monocytotropic ehrlichiosis occurs in California in Ixodes pacificus ticks and in Dermacentor variabilis ticks. Nearly 600 cases were reported to the CDC in 2006. In 2001–2002, the incidence was highest in Missouri, Tennessee, and Oklahoma, as well as in people older than 60.

== See also ==
- Human ewingii ehrlichiosis
- Human granulocytic anaplasmosis
- Monocyte
