= Human granulocytic anaplasmosis =

- Other names: Human granulocytic ehrlichiosis (HGE)
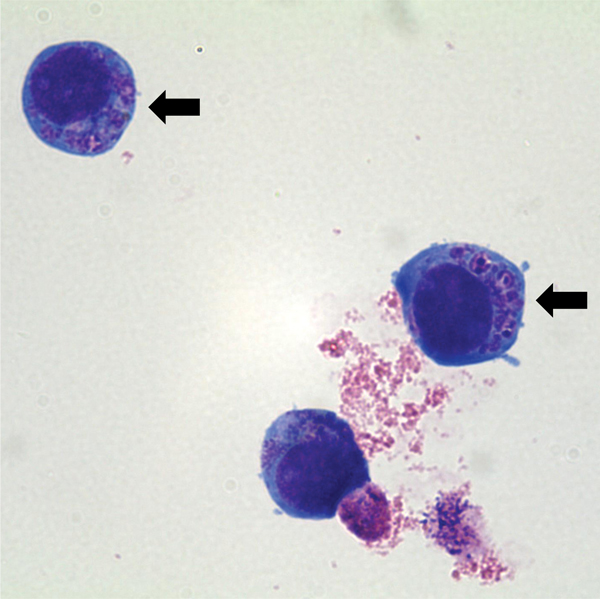
- Anaplasma phagocytophilum cultured in a human promyelocytic cell line, arrows point to cells containing prominent bacterial morulae
- Specialty: Infectious diseases

Human granulocytic anaplasmosis (HGA) is a tick-borne, infectious disease caused by Anaplasma phagocytophilum, an obligate intracellular bacterium that is typically transmitted to humans by ticks of the Ixodes ricinus species complex, including Ixodes scapularis and Ixodes pacificus in North America. These ticks also transmit Lyme disease and other tick-borne diseases.

The bacteria infect white blood cells called neutrophils, causing changes in gene expression that prolong the life of these otherwise short-lived cells.

== Signs and symptoms ==
Signs and symptoms may include:

- fever
- severe headache
- muscle aches (myalgia)
- chills and shaking, similar to the symptoms of influenza
- nausea
- vomiting
- loss of appetite
- unintentional weight loss
- abdominal pain
- cough
- diarrhea
- aching joints
- sensitivity to light
- weakness
- fatigue
- change in mental status (extreme confusion, memory loss, inability to comprehend environment, interaction, reading, etc.)
- temporary loss of basic motor skills

Symptoms may be minor, as evidenced by surveillance studies in high-risk areas. Gastrointestinal tract symptoms occur in less than half of patients and skin rash is seen in less than 10% of patients.

HGA is also characterized by a low number of platelets, a low number of white blood cells, and elevated serum transaminase levels in the majority of infected patients.

Even though people of any age can get HGA, it is usually more severe in the aging or immunocompromised. Some severe complications may include respiratory failure, kidney failure, and secondary infections.

== Cause ==
A. phagocytophilum is transmitted to humans by Ixodes ticks. These ticks are found in the US, Europe, and Asia. In the US, I. scapularis is the tick vector in the East and Midwest states, and I. pacificus in the Pacific Northwest. In Europe, the I. ricinus is the main tick vector, and I. persulcatus is the currently known tick vector in Asia.

The major mammalian reservoir for A. phagocytophilum in the eastern United States is the white-footed mouse, Peromyscus leucopus. Although white-tailed deer and other small mammals harbor A. phagocytophilum, evidence suggests that they are not a reservoir for the strains that cause HGA. A tick that has a blood meal from an infected reservoir becomes infected themselves. If an infected tick then latches onto a human, the disease is then transmitted to the human host and A. phagocytophilum symptoms can arise.

Anaplasma phagocytophilum shares its tick vector with other human pathogens, and about 10% of patients with HGA show serologic evidence of coinfection with Lyme disease, babesiosis, or tick-borne meningoencephalitis.

While it is rare, HGA can be transmitted human-to-human via a blood transfusion, in which case it is called Transfusion-Transmitted Anaplasmosis (TTA).

=== Major surface proteins ===
Many major surface proteins (MSPs) are found in Anaplasma and those which interact with Anaplasma can mainly be found in A. marginale and A. phagocytophilum. Many different phenotypic traits are associated with MSPs, because each MSP can only infect certain animals in certain conditions. A. phagocytophilum infects the most vast array of living things, including humans, and all around the world. A. marginale evolved to be more specific in infecting animals, such as deer and cattle, in the subtropics and tropics. The main difference between these two MSPs is that the host cell for A. phagocytophilum is the granulocyte, while the host cell for A. marginale is erythrocytes. It is likely that these MSPs coevolved, because they had previously interacted via tick-pathogen interaction.

Anaplasma MSPs can not only cooperate with vertebrates, but also invertebrates, which makes these phenotypes evolve faster than others, because they have many selective forces acting on them.

== Diagnosis ==
Clinically, HGA is essentially indistinguishable from human monocytic ehrlichiosis, the infection caused by Ehrlichia chaffeensis, and other tick-borne illnesses such as Lyme disease may be suspected. As Ehrlichia serologies can be negative in the acute period, PCR is very useful for diagnosis.

== Prevention ==
Currently, there is no vaccine against human granulocytic anaplasmosis, so antibiotics are the only form of treatment. The best way to prevent HGA is to prevent getting tick bites.

== Treatment ==
Doxycycline is the treatment of choice. If anaplasmosis is suspected, treatment should not be delayed while waiting for a definitive laboratory confirmation, as prompt doxycycline therapy has been shown to improve outcomes. Presentation during early pregnancy can complicate treatment. Doxycycline compromises dental enamel during development. Although rifampin is indicated for post-delivery pediatric and some doxycycline-allergic patients, it is teratogenic. Rifampin is contraindicated during conception and pregnancy.

Most people make a complete recovery, though some people are intensively cared for after treatment. A reason for a person needing intensive care is if the person goes too long without seeing a doctor or being diagnosed. The majority of people, though, make a complete recovery with no residual damage.

== Epidemiology ==
From the first reported case in 1994 until 2021, HGA's rates of incidence have regularly increased in the United States. Increases in reported cases of Lyme disease, primarily caused by the pathogen Borrelia burgdorferi, and babesiosis have also been observed over the same period, which share a tick vector. Before 2000, there were fewer than 300 HGA cases reported per year. In 2000, there were only 350 reported cases. From 2009-2010, HGA experienced a 52% increase in the number of cases reported. Annual cases of anaplasmosis reported to the U.S. Centers for Disease Control and Prevention reached a record high of 6,729 in 2021, having steadily increased during the previous decade.

In Europe, the number of annual reported cases is lower, below 300, but seroprevalence (for antibody markers of infection) averages 8.3%, suggesting that undiagnosed, unreported or subclinical infections regularly occur. Anaplasmosis also is reported in South Korea, Japan and China; the case fatality rate in one study performed in China between 2009 and 2010 was reported to be 8.1%, but this may be attributable to underdiagnosis. Outbreaks in China previously ascribed to anaplasmosis have been re-evaluated due to the discovery of severe fever with thrombocytopenia syndrome virus, reported in 2011, whose infection clinically mimics anaplasmosis and may co-occur, but unlike anaplasmosis is associated with hemorrhagic fever.

== History ==
The first outbreak of Human Granulocytic Anaplasmosis (HGA) in the United States began with a patient in early 1990 in Wisconsin. He was kept in the hospital in Minnesota for testing, but died without a diagnosis. Over the next couple of years, many people within the same area of Wisconsin and Minnesota had come down with the same symptoms. It was discovered in 1994 that it was Human Granulocytic Ehrlichiosis (HGE), later to be known as HGA.

== Terminology ==
The term human granulocytic ehrlichiosis (HGE) was used historically when the causative agent was classified in the genus Ehrlichia. In 2001, Ehrlichia phagocytophila, Ehrlichia equi, and the "HGE agent" were reclassified as Anaplasma phagocytophilum. Because the organism is now classified as Anaplasma phagocytophilum, the disease is more commonly referred to as human granulocytic anaplasmosis (HGA).

== See also ==
- Ehrlichiosis
