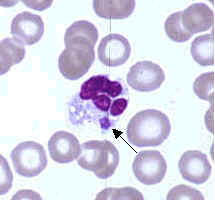

Scientific classification
- Domain: Bacteria
- Kingdom: Pseudomonadati
- Phylum: Pseudomonadota
- Class: Alphaproteobacteria
- Order: Rickettsiales
- Family: Ehrlichiaceae
- Genus: Ehrlichia
- Species: E. ewingii

Binomial name
- Ehrlichia ewingii Anderson et al. 1992

= Ehrlichia ewingii =

Species of bacterium

Ehrlichia ewingii is a species of Rickettsiales bacteria. It has recently been associated with human infection, and can be detected via PCR serological testing. The name Ehrlichia ewingii was proposed in 1992.

== Taxonomy and characterization ==
=== Taxonomy ===
The current classification is Bacteria, Pseudomonadota, Alphaproteobacteria, Rickettsiales, Ehrlichiaceae, Ehrlichia ewingii. Classification of different members of the genus Ehrlichia has been disputed, however, it is generally agreed that close relatives of Ehrlichia ewingii are Ehrlichia chaffeensis and Ehrlichia canis. It is also closely related to Wolbachia, Anaplasma, and Neorickettsia bacteria, with Rickettsia as a more distant genus.

=== Characterization ===
Species in the family Anaplasmataceae have unique characteristics that can help differentiate them from other families including: sensitivity to mechanical stress, changes in osmolarity, and thawing. All Ehrlichia sp. are gram-negative and spherical with a rippled outer membrane that shows no peptidoglycan layer or any lipopolysaccharides.

== History ==
=== Discovery ===
In 1971 Ewing et al. detected a new Ehrlichia strain, which was thought of as another Ehrlichia canis strain. Ehrlichia canis is usually found in lymphocytes and monocytes, but this new strain was found in granulocytes. Due to the variable location, this strain was called Canine Granulocytic Ehrlichia (CGE).

=== Method of identification ===
A field study was conducted by Anderson et al. on June 18, 1987, using a canine diagnosed with granulocytic ehrlichiosis: an infection of the granulocytes by a member of the Ehrlichia sp. The blood from this canine was infused in another specimen to ensure the blood transmission of the intracellular parasite. This transmission was then completed using ticks of the species Amblyomma americanum by exposing them to infected dogs and then to susceptible ones. From blood samples, 16S rRNA genes were amplified using standard polymerase chain reaction (PCR), and the genes were analyzed using gel electrophoresis and a GAP (Genetic Analysis Program) system. This data was compared to all other Ehrlichia species, and Anderson et al. found that CGE is most closely related to E. chaffeensis and E. canis. These three—E. ewingii, E. chaffeensis, and E. canis—form a group in terms of relatedness within the genus Ehrlichia. Despite being related, due to the level of divergence between CGE and the other species, it has been determined that CGE deserves to have species level recognition. The name was proposed to be Ehrlichia ewingii, named after S.A. Ewing, who initially identified the parasitic organism.

== Metabolism and genomics ==
=== Genomics ===
This organism mostly uses host cell machinery to replicate its genome. Although the genome itself has not been sequenced, the use of the host cell for replication is known based on comparisons to other Ehrlichia sp. Since Ehrlichia ewingii is unable to synthesize all the organic compounds required for growth, also known as an auxotroph, the bacterium requires a host for growth and survival.

=== Metabolism ===
No specific studies on E. ewingii metabolism have been conducted so far. However, the organism is assumed to have a similar metabolism to members of the genus due to the high similarity between functional 16S rRNA gene sequencing and the highly related infections they cause within cells.

== Ecology ==
All Ehrlichia sp. are obligate intracellular parasites that are transmitted by ticks to vertebrate animals; Ehrlichia ewingii is specifically transmitted by the North American Tick, Amblyomma americanum. This bacterium then infects granulocytes in canines and humans. Currently, Ehrlichia ewingii cannot be cultivated in a number of cell lines, meaning that study of this organism is dependent on extraction from arthropod and vertebrate hosts.

== Disease and treatment ==
Ehrlichia ewingii is a human pathogen which results in a serious infection if not treated in a timely manner. Ehrlichiosis, the disease caused by E. ewingii and E. chaffeensis, presents with fever, headache, fatigue, and muscle aches. These symptoms are extremely unspecific which makes the infections difficult to diagnose. Doxycycline is effective when administered early in the infection, but despite this, the estimated fatality rate is still 1.8%. This is partially due to the difficulty diagnosing the causative agent of infection, however further Ehrlichia ewingii research could allow better diagnostic tests to identify ehrlichial infections before they progress to severe cases.
