= Ehrlichia chaffeensis =

Scientific classification
- Domain: Bacteria
- Kingdom: Pseudomonadati
- Phylum: Pseudomonadota
- Class: Alphaproteobacteria
- Order: Rickettsiales
- Family: Ehrlichiaceae
- Genus: Ehrlichia
- Species: E. chaffeensis

Binomial name
- Ehrlichia chaffeensis Anderson et al. 1992

Species of bacterium

Ehrlichia chaffeensis is an obligately intracellular, coccus-shaped, Gram-negative bacterium, known for its role in causing human monocytic ehrlichiosis (HME), a tick-borne infectious disease in humans. E. chaffeensis is one of three ehrlichiosis-causing bacteria in the United States, along with E. ewingii and E. muris eauclairensis, though not all are associated with human-specific infection.

E. chaffeensis is primarily spread through the bite of an infected lone star tick (Amblyomma americanum). These infections occur primarily in the South-central and Mid-Atlantic regions of the United States, where the tick vector is established. White-tailed deer serve as reservoir hosts for E. chaffeensis. Humans, coyotes, and other carnivores are considered to be incidental hosts.

Infection with E. chaffeensis is associated with malaise, headaches, and fever. Some patients may present with rashes. Prompt treatment is important to prevent the development of severe illness and death.

E. chaffeensis was named after Fort Chaffee, Arkansas, where the patient associated with the first recognized case of HME was stationed in 1986.

== Microbiology ==
Ehrlichia chaffeensis is a small, obligate intracellular bacterium belonging to the family Anaplasmataceae within the order Rickettsiales. Molecular classification of Ehrlichia species has used sequence analysis of the 16S rRNA gene and the groESL heat-shock operon, while comparative genomic studies have provided further insights into their evolutionary relationships. Although E. chaffeensis possesses a Gram-negative-type cell envelope with inner and outer membranes, it lacks conventional lipopolysaccharide and peptidoglycan. The bacterium primarily replicates within membrane-bound compartments in the cytoplasm of monocytes and macrophages.

E. chaffeensis has two morphological forms: dense-cored cells and reticulate cells. Dense-cored cells are smaller, approximately 0.4-0.6 μm in diameter, and represent the infectious form of the bacterium. Following entry into a host cell, dense-cored bacteria differentiate into larger reticulate cells, approximately 0.4-0.6 μm by 0.7-1.9 μm, which replicate by binary fission within the membrane-bound compartments of the host cell cytoplasm. These compartments, known as morulae, contain clusters of replicating bacteria and are visible under a microscope. As the developmental cycle progresses, reticulate cells differentiate back into infectious dense-cored cells, which are subsequently released and can infect additional cells.

==== Genome ====
The genome of E. chaffeensis consists of a single circular chromosome approximately 1.18 million base pairs long, reflecting the relatively small genome characteristic of many obligately intracellular bacteria. The genome contains repetitive DNA sequences and expanded families of genes encoding outer-membrane proteins, including the OMP-1 family. Comparative genomic studies have also identified duplicated genes and reduced amino acid biosynthetic capabilities, reflecting adaptations associated with its intracellular lifestyle.

==== Metabolism ====
The reduced genome of E. chaffeensis lacks many genes involved in amino acid biosynthesis and central metabolic pathways, making the bacterium dependent on host cells for essential nutrients. Although its glycolytic pathway is incomplete, E. chaffeensis retains components of aerobic respiration, including the tricarboxylic acid cycle and electron transport chain, allowing it to generate ATP through oxidative metabolism.

Experimental studies have demonstrated that E. chaffeensis takes up the amino acids proline and glutamine during intracellular growth. The enzyme PutA converts proline into glutamate, while glutamine synthetase (GlnA) converts glutamate into glutamine. The findings suggest that the NtrY/NtrX two-component system regulates the expression of genes encoding these enzymes in response to amino acid availability, and contributes to the initiation of bacterial replication.

In addition to its dependence on host-derived nutrients, E. chaffeensis acquires membrane lipids from infected host cells. Experimental studies have demonstrated that the bacterium incorporates host-derived cholesterol and phospholipids into its membranes. Inhibition of host lipid biosynthesis reduces bacterial proliferation, indicating that host-derived lipids are important for intracellular growth.

==== Cultivation ====
As an obligately intracellular bacterium, E. chaffeensis requires living host cells for cultivation. It can be propagated in mammalian cell lines, including the canine macrophage cell line DH82 and the human monocytic leukemia cell line THP-1, as well as tick-derived cell lines such as ISE6 and AAE2. These culture systems are used to investigate the bacterium's developmental cycle and interactions with host cells.

== Pathogenesis ==
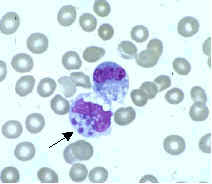
Blood smear of HME patient; arrow shows an inclusion, within which morulae of E. chaffeensis are contained.

In humans, E. chaffeensis causes HME and infects monocytes. It also infects other cell types such as lymphocytes, atypical lymphocytes, myelocytes, and neutrophils, but monocytes appear to best harbor the infection.

E. chaffeensis has also been shown to infect canines both naturally and artificially. Symptoms in canine infections are hard to differentiate between E. chaffeensis infection and E. canis, which is the species of Ehrlichia that most commonly affects canines.

Traditionally, phagocytic cells recognize invading bacteria with pattern recognition receptors (PRRs) that bind to pathogen-associated molecular patterns (PAMPs), which signal the phagocyte to engulf the pathogen. Due to the lack of classical PAMPs like peptidoglycan and lipopolysaccharide on E. chaffeensis cells, they are able to avoid phagocytosis prior to monocyte infection.

E. chaffeensis entry into the cell is receptor-mediated. It enters leukocytes by binding EtpE, an outer-membrane invasin unique to the bacterium, to the outer membrane of the host cell. DNaseX, a GPI-anchored endonuclease, is used as a receptor for the invasin protein.

Once E. chaffeensis is inside the cell, it forms morulae, which have been observed to resemble early endosomes, within which it replicates exclusively. However, degradation from lysosomes still poses a threat to the pathogen. The morulae release a protein called Ehrlichia translocated factor-2 (Etf-2), a type IV secretion effector. Etf-2 binds to RAB5-GTP, an active form of Rab5 used to initiate a signaling cascade for recruitment of Rab7 to initiate degradation by lysosome. The binding of RAB5-GTP prevents this cascade and inhibits lysosomes from binding to inclusions, preserving E. chaffeensis long enough to proliferate inside the host cell. The bacterium uses other type IV secretion effectors, Etf-1 and ECH0825, to inhibit apoptosis by localizing to the mitochondria and preventing Bax-induced apoptosis which further preserves the host cell for continued proliferation.

E. chaffeensis does not produce exotoxins; much of the damage it causes results from the host immune response. Ehrlichia infection upregulates the MyD88 signaling pathway, causing an overproduction of systemic chemokines and cytokines. This inflammation leads to the classical symptoms of HME.

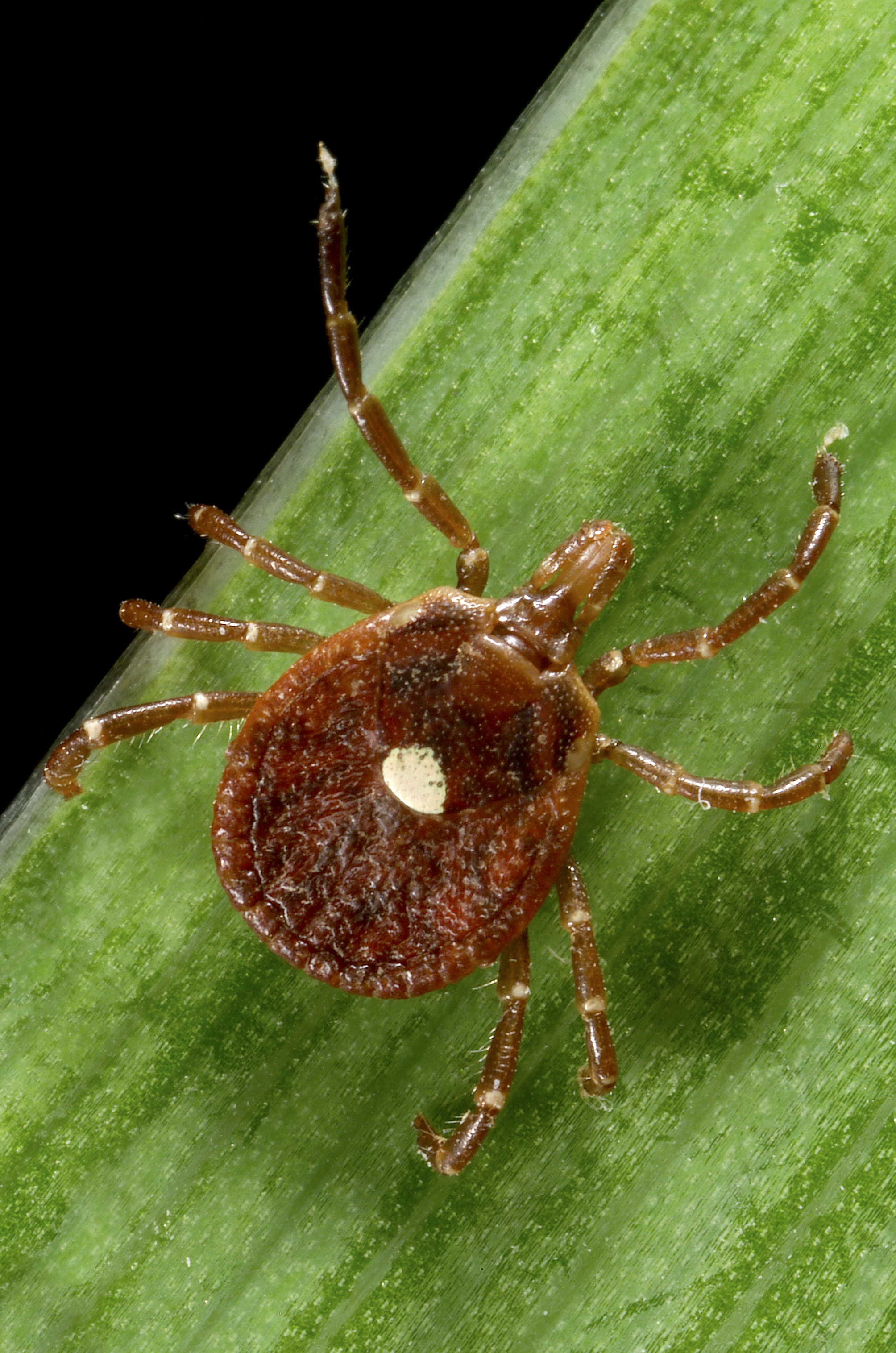
A lone star tick (Amblyomma americanum), the primary agent of infection for Ehrlichia chaffeensis.

== Transmission cycle ==
E. chaffeensis is maintained in nature through a complex zoonotic relationship termed vector-borne transmission. The lone star tick (Amblyomma americanum) serves as the primary vector of E. chaffeensis. Because the white-tailed deer (Odocoileus virginianus) can maintain the E. chaffeensis infections from weeks to months and can provide a food source for all three mobile tick stages, they serve as the main reservoir for E. chaffeensis. Humans, coyotes, and other carnivores are considered to be incidental hosts.

Surveillance studies of ticks infected with E. chaffeensis have indicated Haemaphysalis longicornis, a non-native tick, as a possible emerging vector.

Since E. chaffeensis is not spread through transovarial transmission, but rather transstadial transmission, tick eggs and larvae are not initially infected. In order to become infected with E. chaffeensis, unfed larvae must feed on the blood of infected reservoirs to become vectors themselves. Transmission typically requires the tick to be attached for at least 24 hours. A physical prerequisite for transstadial passage of an Ehrlichia is the molting of the Ehrlichia infected tick from larve to nymphs via ecdysone receptor upregulation.

Ehrlichiosis is not contagious and cannot be transferred without a vector. The primary source of human infections is by an infected tick bite. However, E. chaffeensis can be directed transmitted between humans by blood transfusions and transplants.

Experimental studies in the related species Ehrlichia japonica have suggested that the conserved effector TRP120 promotes sustained bacteremia needed for efficient tick acquisition, providing a possible molecular explanation for maintenance of the tick–mammal transmission cycle in Ehrlichia.

== Signs and symptoms ==
Infection with Ehrlichia chaffeensis causes human monocytic ehrlichiosis. Symptoms typically develop within 1 to 2 weeks after exposure, with a median incubation period of approximately 9 days. Early symptoms commonly include fever, headache, malaise, myalgia, and nausea. Without treatment, symptoms can become more severe. Late-stage ehrlichiosis can cause meningoencephalitis, respiratory failure, uncontrolled bleeding, organ failure, and death. Death typically occurs in individuals with delayed or absent treatment.

As the course of infection continues, petechial, macular, and maculopapular rashes may occur with varied distribution and onset, typically 5 days after fever presents. Rashes occur in approximately 67% of cases, most of them in children. They are more commonly reported in adults with HIV infection.

Fulminant infections are more common in immunocompromised patients. Typical factors include HIV infection, immunosuppressive medications, cancer, organ transplant recipients, and chronic illnesses such as diabetes or connective tissue disorders. Patient fatality is also noted most often in cases involving individuals under the age of 5 and over the age of 70.

HME can be fatal without effective treatment, and diagnosis is important but symptoms are non-specific and can easily be misdiagnosed. Documented tick exposure can increase the likelihood of correct diagnosis and prompt care. The length of time between disease development and treatment directly correlates with the risk of symptoms requiring ICU care.

Overall case fatality is 2-3%, but male sex, advanced age, and an immunocompromised status have been associated with a higher mortality.

== Diagnosis and detection ==
Diagnosis of Ehrlichia chaffeensis infection involves polymerase chain reaction (PCR), serologic testing, blood smear microscopy, immunohistochemistry, and bacterial culture. The usefulness of these detection methods depends on the stage of infection.

Polymerase chain reaction (PCR) detects E. chaffeensis DNA in whole blood. PCR testing is most sensitive during the first week of illness. PCR sensitivity decreases after appropriate antibiotic administration; however, a negative result does not exclude an infection. Whole blood is collected in tubes containing ethylenediaminetetraacetic acid (EDTA), and is commonly used for molecular testing.

Serologic testing is commonly performed using an indirect immunofluorescence antibody (IFA) assay to detect immunoglobulin G (IgG) antibodies against Ehrlichia species. Confirmation of a recent infection typically requires a fourfold increase in antibody titer between paired acute and convalescent serum samples, with the second sample being collected 2-10 weeks after the first. Antibodies may be undetectable during the first week of illness, which limits the usefulness of early serologic testing. Cross-reactivity with other Ehrlichia and Anaplasma species can also complicate interpretation.

Blood smear microscopy may detect morulae in the cytoplasm of infected monocytes by using Romanowsky-type stains, such as Giemsa or Wright stains. However, morulae are not consistently detectable in peripheral blood, making microscopy less sensitive than molecular testing. Their presence alone is insufficient to conclusively identify the infecting species.

Immunohistochemistry and bacterial culture are additional methods of detection, but are typically restricted to specialized laboratories. Immunohistochemical staining can identify ehrlichial antigens in tissue specimens; however, isolation of E. chaffeensis requires cultivation in living host cells. Routine hospital blood cultures cannot detect the organism. These methods are, therefore, not commonly used for initial diagnosis.

== Epidemiology ==
=== United States ===
The lone star tick (Amblyomma americanum) serves as the primary biological vector in North America, and the main vertebrate reservoir is the white-tailed deer (Odocoileus virginianus). This is the most common biting tick in the southeastern United States, where residents have the highest reported risk.

Reported United States cases across 27 states have increased from 142 in 2001 to 2,093 in 2019, then fell in 2020. Additionally, some US tick species such as A. tenellum and H. longicornis have shown E. chaffeensis DNA.

=== Other countries ===
Studies have shown that there are serologic and molecular signals linked to E. chaffeensis in other countries. Studies in Argentina provided findings that suggest a putative local cycle with marsh deer and Amblyomma triste. E. chaffeensis-like DNA has been detected in Amblyomma ticks in Mexico, with possible zoonotic implications.

PCR testing in southern China found Amblyomma testudinarium and Haemaphysalis yeni ticks to be positive for the presence on E. chaffeensis.

Minimal, but present serological evidence of E. chaffeensis is tied to Africa. In a study using indirect immunofluorescence, it was found that 2 out of 765 asymptomatic blood samples contained E. chaffeensis antibodies.

Serological evidence of E. chaffeensis has also been reported in Korean patients.

=== Seasonality ===
Most United States cases occur from spring to midsummer, with over 93% of cases reported between April and September, and about 70% between May and July. This is due to the lone star tick's nymphal and adult activity.

=== Locale ===
There are higher incident rates of E. chaffeensis in rural areas. This rate increases with an increasing deer population and larger area of forest coverage.

== Treatment ==
Infections caused by E. chaffeensis are treated with tetracyclines, a class of broad-spectrum, ribosomal-binding antibiotics. Doxycycline is the recommended treatment for human monocytic ehrlichiosis in both adults and children. Treatment should be administered as soon as ehrlichiosis is suspected, and not delayed pending laboratory confirmation due to potential long-term complications and death.

The majority of early infections are treated orally as outpatients: 100 mg twice daily for adults, or 2.2 mg/kg twice daily for children weighing <45 kilograms. Severely ill patients receive doses intravenously and for longer periods of time. Antibiotic treatment should be taken at least three days after symptoms subside to ensure the absence of infection, typically 5-7 days.

Special cases of HME can be treated with rifampin in cases of tetracycline allergy and pregnancy. Rifampin shows bactericidal properties when studied in vitro and has also successfully treated a range of patients, mostly pregnant women and children.

== Prevention ==
There is no current vaccine to prevent ehrlichiosis caused by E. chaffeensis. Prevention can depend on location and reservoir prevalence. It is recommended in the Midwestern, Eastern, and Southeastern United States to keep grass lower than 5 inches, stay on cleared paths in wooded areas, check for ticks after potential exposure, and wear insect repellent.

== See also ==
- Ehrlichiosis
- Rickettsiales
