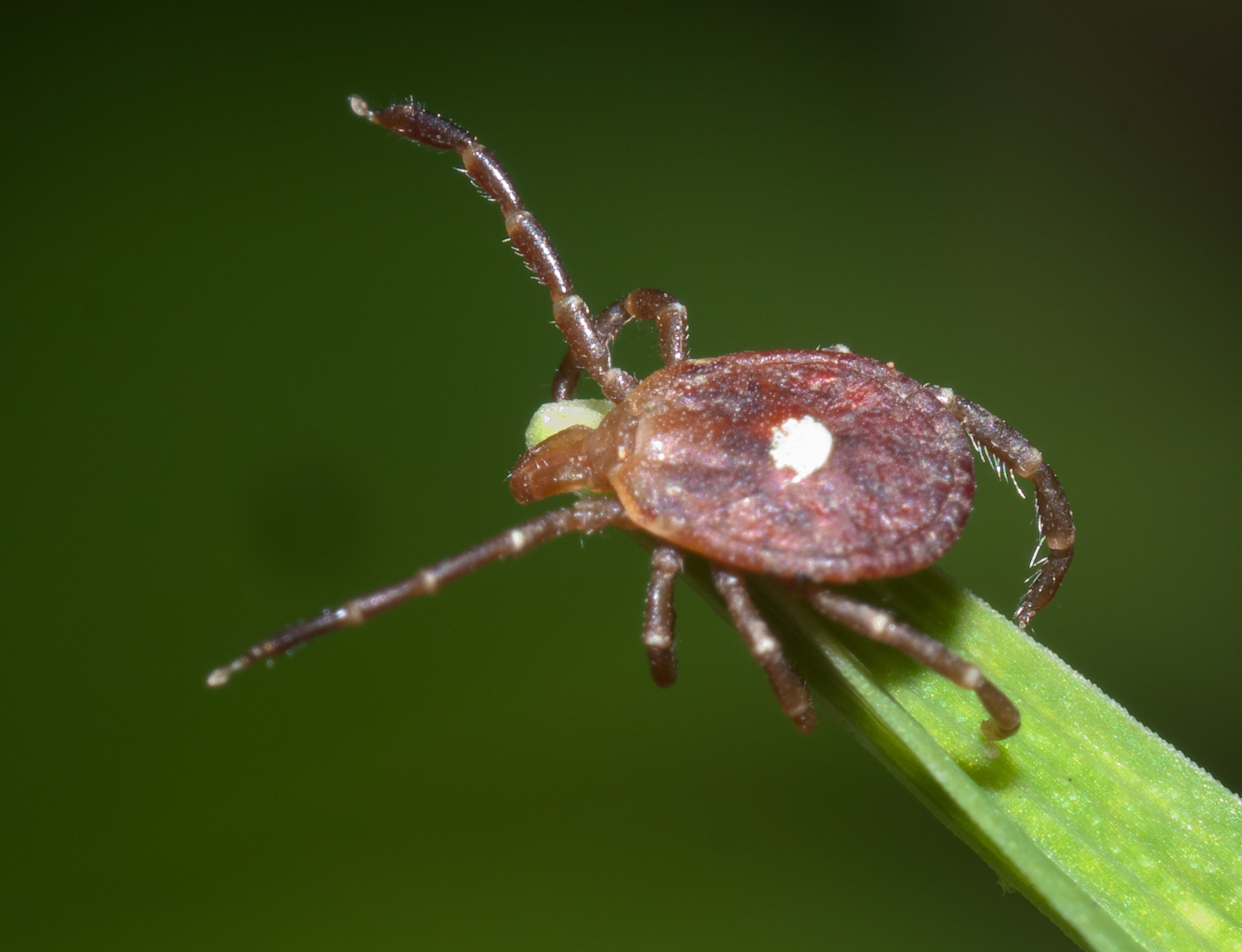
- Adult female

Scientific classification
- Kingdom: Animalia
- Phylum: Arthropoda
- Subphylum: Chelicerata
- Class: Arachnida
- Order: Ixodida
- Family: Ixodidae
- Genus: Amblyomma
- Species: A. americanum

Binomial name
- Amblyomma americanum (Linnaeus, 1758)
- Red indicates where the species is normally found; Blue indicates other locations where the species has been reported

Synonyms
- Acarus americanus Linnaeus, 1758; Acarus nigua De Geer, 1778; Amblyomma foreli Stoll, 1890; Amblyomma unipunctatum Thurow, 1891; Amblyomma unipunctum Packard, 1870; Euthesius americanus Gistel, 1848; Ixodes americanus Fabricius, 1805

= Amblyomma americanum =

Lone star tick

Species of tick

Amblyomma americanum, also known as the lone star tick, northeastern water tick, turkey tick, and cricker tick, is a type of tick indigenous to much of the eastern United States and Mexico that bites painlessly and commonly goes unnoticed, remaining attached to its host for as long as seven days until it is fully engorged with blood. It bites aggressively, and its larvae may transfer themselves to skin from discarded clothing that is put back on. The sexually dimorphic adult female lone star tick bears a silvery-white, somewhat star-shaped spot near the center of the posterior portion of its dorsal shield (scutum); adult males conversely have varied white streaks or spots around the margins of their shields.

It is to the female's identifying spot, not to the nickname of the state of Texas, that A. americanum owes the name lone star tick, while it owes the name turkey tick to the wild turkeys that are a common host in its immature stages in some Midwestern U.S. states. It is the primary vector of Ehrlichia chaffeensis, which causes human monocytic ehrlichiosis, and Ehrlichia ewingii, which causes human and canine granulocytic ehrlichiosis. Its bite may also cause a human to develop alpha-gal syndrome, an allergy to non-catarrhine mammalian meat. Other disease-causing bacterial agents isolated from lone star ticks include Francisella tularensis, Rickettsia amblyommii, and Coxiella burnetti.

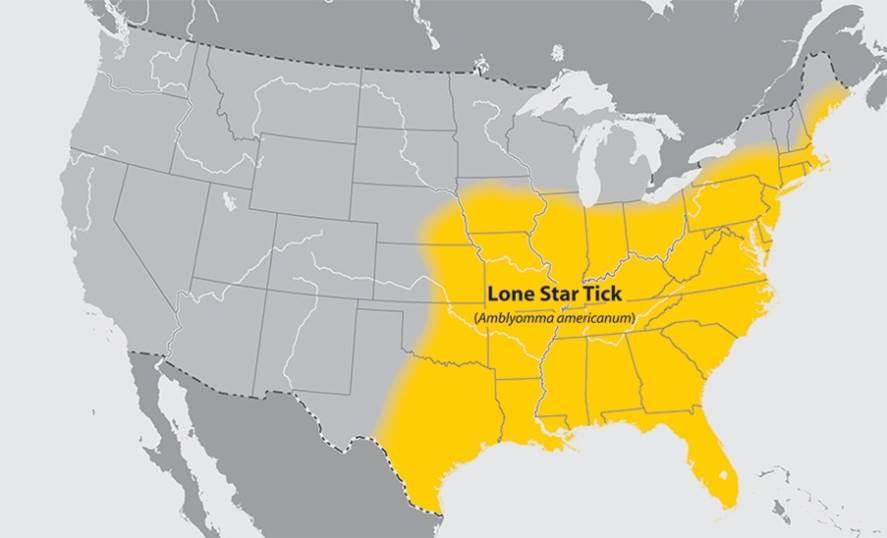
The distribution of the lone star tick (Amblyomma americanum) in the United States

== Range and habitat ==
The lone star tick is widely distributed across the East, Southeast, and Midwest United States. It lives in wooded areas, particularly in second-growth forests with thick underbrush, where white-tailed deer (the primary host of mature ticks) reside. Lone star ticks can also be found in ecotonal areas (transition zones between different biomes) such as those between forest and grassland ecosystems. The lone star tick uses thick underbrush or high grass to attach to its host by way of questing, that is, climbing up a blade of grass or to the edges of leaves, stretching its front legs forward, and—in response to stimuli from biochemicals such as carbon dioxide, heat, and vibration from movement—mounting a passing host as it brushes against the tick's legs. Once attached to its host, the tick will move around and select a preferred feeding site.

The tick has also been reported outside of its range in Canada, in areas of Southern Ontario, including in London, Wellington County, and the Region of Waterloo.

== Development ==
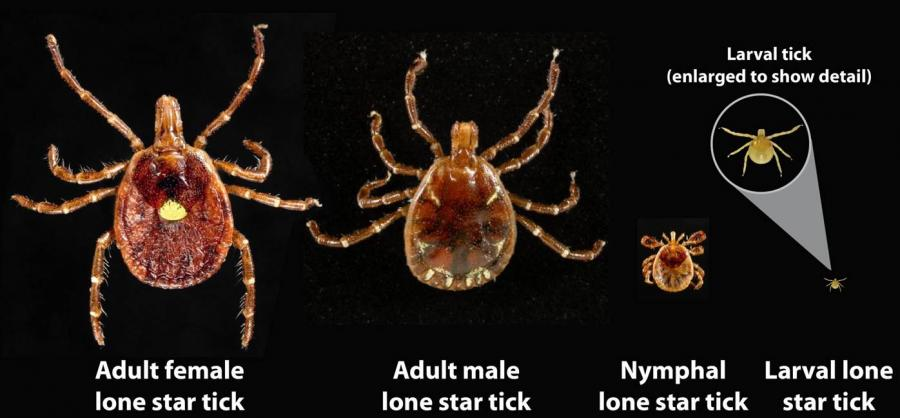
Developmental stages of the lone star tick (A. americanum)

The lone star tick develops through four life stages: egg, six-legged larva, eight-legged nymph, and adult. Like many hard ticks, it is a three-host tick: the larva, nymph, and adult each take a blood meal, usually on a separate host, before dropping off to molt or reproduce.

All mobile stages participate in questing, a host-seeking behavior in which ticks wait on vegetation or leaf litter with their front legs extended, and attach when a host brushes past. After hatching, the larva undergo a quiescent (resting) period, followed by pursuit of a host via questing. Feeding for one to three days, the blood-engorged larvae dislodge to digest their blood meal, and molt into nymphs. The nymph repeats this pattern, finding another host before dropping off and molting into an adult.

Mating occurs on the host animal after adult males and females have attached. The male feeds first, often taking repeated small blood meals, then detaches and moves across the host surface to find females. Males may mate repeatedly on the same host, while fertilized females continue feeding until fully engorged. After its final blood meal, the female drops to the ground and lays a single egg mass, typically consisting of several thousand eggs, and dies shortly after oviposition.

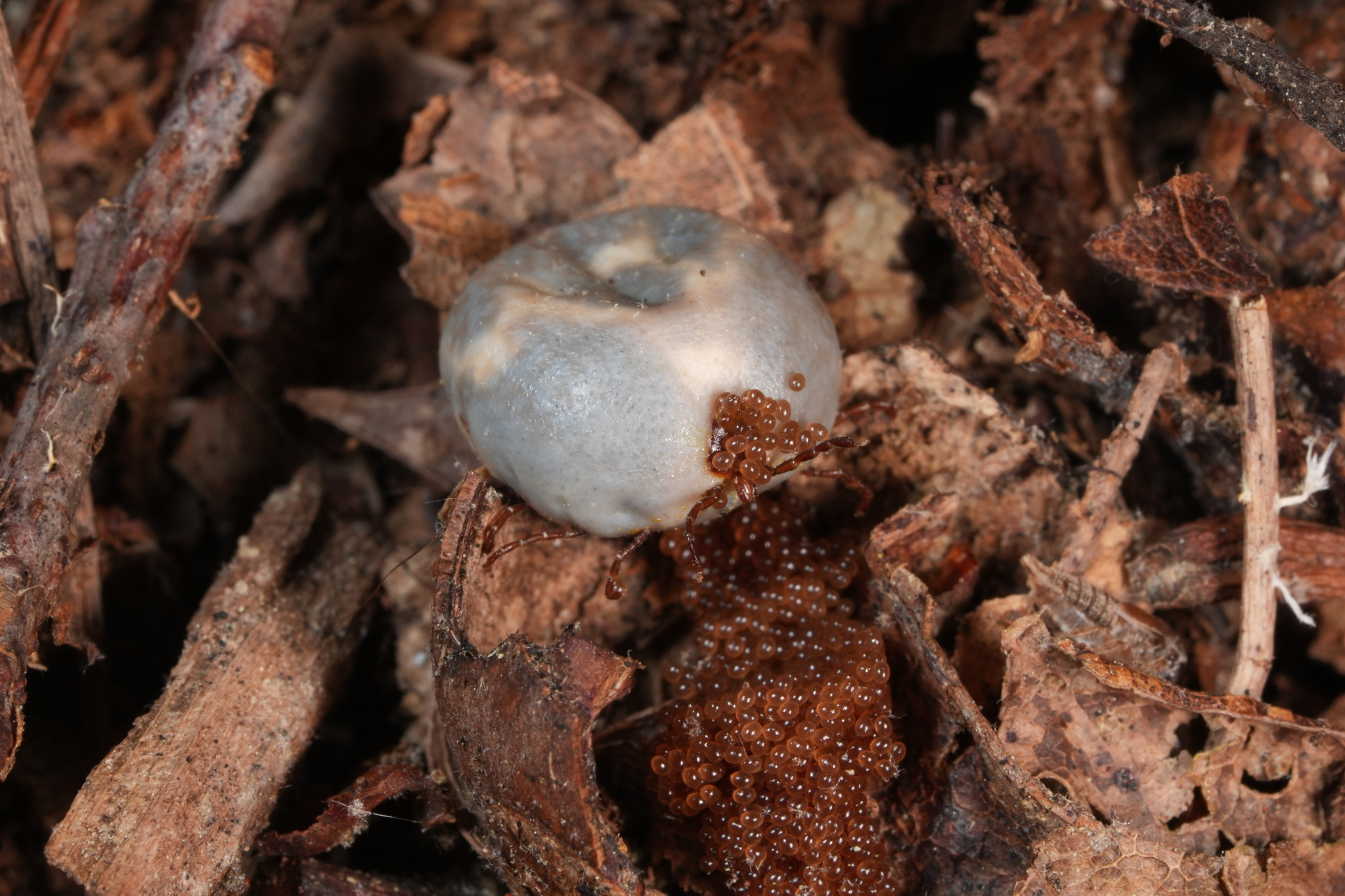
Engorged female with eggs. After feeding, the female drops from the host and lays an egg mass in leaf litter or another protected, humid site.

Fully engorged females can weigh several hundred milligrams, with one report using white-tailed deer as hosts finding a mean weight of about 0.63 g and a mean production of 5,873 eggs per female. Eggs are typically laid in late spring to early summer. Incubation varies with temperature and habitat conditions. In one field study, eggs in meadow habitat hatched after about 31–67 days in 1973 and 40–55 days in 1974, supporting a general incubation period of roughly one to two months under warm-season field conditions.

The full life cycle can be completed in less than a year if hosts and environmental conditions are favorable, but development in the field usually takes up to two years, as a good deal of time is spent off-host while molting, questing, overwintering, or being delayed by diapause. In one laboratory study, larvae fed for 4–9 days, nymphs for 3–8 days, and fertilized adult females completed engorgement in about 10–15 days. After dropping from the host, engorged larvae molted into nymphs after 3–4 weeks, and engorged nymphs molted into adults after about 5–6 weeks.

Across much of its range south of New York, adults seek hosts from mid-March through late June, nymphs from mid-May through late July, and larvae from July through September. Fed larvae and nymphs commonly overwinter and molt the following spring.

== Hosts ==
The lone star tick is an aggressive, generalist feeder; it actively pursues blood meals and is not specific about the species of host upon which it feeds. As mentioned prior, A. americanum requires a separate animal or human host to complete each stage of its life cycle.

Larval lone star ticks have been found attached to birds and small mammals, and nymphal ticks have been found on these two groups, as well as on small rodents. Adult lone star ticks usually feed on medium and large mammals, and are very frequently found on white-tailed deer. Because adults commonly feed on white-tailed deer, deer abundance and movement can help maintain and disperse lone star tick populations. Lone star ticks are known to feed on humans at any stage of development, with nymphs and adult females most frequently reported.

== Vector ==
Amblyomma americanum is a known vector of several pathogens affecting humans and other animals, including Ehrlichia chaffeensis and Ehrlichia ewingii, which cause forms of ehrlichiosis, and Francisella tularensis, the agent of tularemia. Bites from the species are also associated with southern tick-associated rash illness (STARI), a Lyme-like rash illness of unknown cause. STARI can produce an expanding rash similar to the erythema migrans rash of Lyme disease, but studies show that it is not caused by Borrelia burgdorferi, the bacterium responsible for Lyme disease.

Though the primary bacterium responsible for Lyme disease, Borrelia burgdorferi, has occasionally been isolated from lone star ticks, numerous vector competency tests have demonstrated that this tick is extremely unlikely to be capable of transmitting Lyme disease. Some evidence indicates A. americanum saliva inactivates B. burgdorferi more quickly than the saliva of Ixodes scapularis. Recently the bacteria Borrelia andersonii and Borrelia americana have been linked to A. americanum.

In 2013, in response to two cases of severe febrile illness occurring in two farmers in northwestern Missouri, researchers determined the lone star tick can transmit the heartland virus. Six more cases were identified in 2012–2013 in Missouri and Tennessee.

== Meat allergy ==
The bite of the lone star tick can cause a person to develop alpha-gal meat allergy, a delayed response to nonprimate mammalian meat and meat products. The allergy manifests as anaphylaxis—a life-threatening allergic reaction characterized by constriction of airways and a drop in blood pressure. This response is triggered by an IgE antibody to the mammalian oligosaccharide galactose-alpha-1,3-galactose (alpha-gal). A study published in 2019 discovered alpha-gal in the saliva of the lone star tick. As well as occurring in non-primate mammals, alpha-gal is also found in cat dander and in the drug cetuximab. Allergic reactions to alpha-gal usually occur 3–6 hours after consuming red meat, unlike allergic reactions to other foods, whose onset following consumption is more or less immediate, making it more difficult to identify what caused the reaction. Skin tests with standard meat test solutions are unreliable when testing for alpha-gal allergy, whereas skin tests with raw meat and/or pork kidney are more sensitive. Specific tests for determination of IgE to alpha-gal are available.

== See also ==
- Ticks of domestic animals
- Surendra RS; Shahid Karim (2021). "Tick Saliva and the Alpha-Gal Syndrome: Finding a Needle in a Haystack". Frontiers in Cellular and Infection Microbiology. 11. doi:10.3389/fcimb.2021.680264. PMC 8331069. PMID 34354960.
- Surendra RS; Choudhary S; Vorobiov J; Commins SP J; Shahid Karim (2024). "Tick bite-induced alpha-gal syndrome and immunologic responses in an alpha-gal deficient murine model". Frontiers in Immunology. 14. doi:10.3389/fimmu.2023.1336883. PMC 10882631. PMID 38390396.
