= Ehrlichia muris =

Scientific classification
- Domain: Bacteria
- Kingdom: Pseudomonadati
- Phylum: Pseudomonadota
- Class: Alphaproteobacteria
- Order: Rickettsiales
- Family: Ehrlichiaceae
- Genus: Ehrlichia
- Species: E. muris

Binomial name
- Ehrlichia muris Wen et al. 1995

Species of bacterium

Ehrlichia muris, also Ehrlichia muris eauclairensis, is a species of pathogenic bacteria first isolated from mice, with type strain AS145^{T}. Its genome has been sequenced.

== Taxonomy and nomenclature ==
Ehrlichia muris was first described in 1995 on the basis of 16S rRNA sequence data and serological, morphological, and biological characteristics from strain AS145^{T}, which had been isolated from a wild mouse in Japan. A closely related organism later identified as a cause of human ehrlichiosis in the upper Midwestern United States was initially referred to as the "Ehrlichia muris-like agent". In 2017, this taxon was formally classified as Ehrlichia muris subsp. eauclairensis, while the original type strain was reclassified as Ehrlichia muris subsp. muris.

== Genome ==
The complete genome sequence of Ehrlichia muris strain AS145^{T} has been published. The strain was originally isolated from a wild mouse in Japan in 1983 and is widely used as a laboratory model of monocytotropic ehrlichiosis in mice.

== Transmission and hosts ==
Ehrlichia muris was originally isolated from a wild mouse in Japan, supporting a rodent-associated enzootic cycle. In the United States, the closely related subspecies E. muris subsp. eauclairensis has been detected in Ixodes scapularis ticks and in small mammals including Peromyscus leucopus, suggesting that blacklegged ticks and small mammal hosts contribute to its natural transmission cycle.

== Human disease ==
Human ehrlichiosis associated with Ehrlichia muris has been reported in the United States from infections caused by Ehrlichia muris subsp. eauclairensis, formerly known as the Ehrlichia muris-like agent. Reported cases have been concentrated in Wisconsin and Minnesota, and in travelers to those states. Clinical manifestations are similar to those of other ehrlichioses and may include fever, headache, malaise, myalgia, leukopenia, thrombocytopenia, and elevated hepatic transaminase levels.

== Treatment ==
As with other ehrlichioses, doxycycline is the treatment of choice for suspected infection and should be started as soon as ehrlichiosis is suspected rather than delayed pending laboratory confirmation.

== Use as a laboratory model ==
Ehrlichia muris strain AS145^{T} is widely used as an experimental model for monocytotropic ehrlichiosis in mice because it establishes persistent infection in laboratory mice and can be used to study host immunity and pathogenesis.
