= Ehrlichiosis (canine) =

Tick-borne disease of dogs

Ehrlichiosis (/ˌɛərlɪkiˈoʊsɪs/; also known as canine rickettsiosis, canine hemorrhagic fever, canine typhus, tracker dog disease, and tropical canine pancytopenia) is a tick-borne disease of dogs usually caused by the rickettsial agent Ehrlichia canis. Ehrlichia canis is the pathogen of animals. Humans can become infected by E. canis and other species after tick exposure. German Shepherd Dogs are thought to be susceptible to a particularly severe form of the disease; other breeds generally have milder clinical signs. Cats can also be infected.

== Ehrlichia ==
Ehrlichia is a rickettsial genus of bacteria belonging to the family Ehrlichiaceae. There are several species of Ehrlichia, but the one that most commonly affects dogs and causes the most severe clinical signs is Ehrlichia canis. This species infects monocytes in the peripheral blood. The brown dog tick, or Rhipicephalus sanguineous, which passes the organism to the dog, is prevalent throughout most of the United States, but most cases tend to occur in the Southwest and Gulf Coast regions, where there is a high concentration of the tick. Ehrlichia is found in many parts of the world and was first recognized in Algeria in 1935. During the Vietnam War ehrlichiosis became well known as a dog disease due to the infection and death of many military working dogs. Two types of human ehrlichiosis have been identified in the United States: human monocytic ehrlichiosis and human granulocytic ehrlichiosis.

== Disease overview ==
Dogs get ehrlichiosis from the brown dog tick, which passes an ehrlichia organism into the bloodstream when it bites. It is also possible for dogs to become infected through a blood transfusion from an infected dog. There are three stages of ehrlichiosis, each varying in severity. The acute stage, occurring several weeks after infection and lasting for up to a month, can lead to fever and lowered peripheral blood cell counts due to bone marrow suppression. The second stage, called the subclinical phase, has no outward signs and can last for the remainder of the dog's life, during which the dog remains infected with the organism. Some dogs are able to successfully eliminate the disease during this time. In some dogs the third and most serious stage of infection, the chronic phase, will commence. Very low blood cell counts (pancytopenia), bleeding, bacterial infection, lameness, neurological and ophthalmic disorders, and kidney disease can result. Chronic ehrlichiosis can be fatal.

== Signs and symptoms ==
The acute stage of the disease, occurring most often in the spring and summer, begins one to three weeks after infection and lasts for two to four weeks. Clinical signs include a fever, petechiae, bleeding disorders, vasculitis, lymphadenopathy, discharge from the nose and eyes, and edema of the legs and scrotum. There are no outward signs of the subclinical phase. Clinical signs of the chronic phase include weight loss, pale gums due to anemia, bleeding due to thrombocytopenia, vasculitis, lymphadenopathy, dyspnea, coughing, polyuria, polydipsia, lameness, ophthalmic diseases such as retinal hemorrhage and anterior uveitis, and neurological disease. Dogs that are severely affected can die from this disease.

Although people can get ehrlichiosis, dogs do not transmit the bacteria to humans; rather, ticks pass on the ehrlichia organism. Clinical signs of human ehrlichiosis include fever, headache, eye pain, and gastrointestinal upset. It is quite similar to Rocky Mountain spotted fever, but rash is not seen in patients.

== Diagnosis ==
Diagnosis is achieved most commonly by serologic testing of the blood for the presence of antibodies against the ehrlichia organism. Many veterinarians routinely test for the disease, especially in enzootic areas. During the acute phase of infection, the test can be falsely negative because the body will not have had time to make antibodies to the infection. As such, the test should be repeated. A PCR (polymerase chain reaction) test can be performed during this stage to detect genetic material of the bacteria. The PCR test is more likely to yield a negative result during the subclinical and chronic disease phases. In addition, blood tests may show abnormalities in the numbers of red blood cells, white blood cells, and most commonly platelets, if the disease is present. Uncommonly, a diagnosis can be made by looking under a microscope at a blood smear for the presence of the ehrlichia morulae, which sometimes can be seen as intracytoplasmic inclusion bodies within a white blood cell.

== Prognosis ==
The prognosis for dogs with acute canine monocytic ehrlichiosis is generally good when treatment is started early. In contrast, the prognosis is more guarded in chronic disease, particularly in dogs with pancytopenia or severe bone marrow suppression, which may be associated with a poor response to treatment.

== Treatment ==
Supportive care must be provided to animals that have clinical signs. Subcutaneous or intravenous fluids are given to dehydrated animals, and severely anemic dogs may require a blood transfusion. Treatment for ehrlichiosis involves the use of antibiotics such as tetracycline or doxycycline for a period of three to four weeks; Alternatively minocycline or rifampicin can be used as a second option. Treatment with macrolide antibiotics like clarithromycin and azithromycin is being studied. In addition, steroids may be indicated in severe cases in which the level of platelets is so low that the condition is life-threatening.

== Prevention ==
Tick control is the most effective method of prevention, but tetracycline at a lower dose can be given daily for 200 days during the tick season in endemic regions.
