= Ehrlichia canis =

Scientific classification
- Domain: Bacteria
- Kingdom: Pseudomonadati
- Phylum: Pseudomonadota
- Class: Alphaproteobacteria
- Order: Rickettsiales
- Family: Ehrlichiaceae
- Genus: Ehrlichia
- Species: E. canis

Binomial name
- Ehrlichia canis (Donatien and Lestoquard 1935) Moshkovski 1945

Species of bacterium

Ehrlichia canis is an obligate intracellular bacterium that acts as the causative agent of ehrlichiosis, a disease most commonly affecting canine species. This pathogen is present throughout the United States (but is most prominent in the South), South America, Asia, Africa and recently in the Kimberley region of Australia. First defined in 1935, E. canis emerged in the United States in 1963 and its presence has since been found in all 48 contiguous United States. Reported primarily in dogs, E. canis has also been documented in felines and humans, where it is transferred most commonly via Rhipicephalus sanguineus, the brown dog tick.

== Transmission cycle ==
The brown dog tick, R. sanguineus, acts as the primary vector of E. canis, transferring the pathogen between hosts during blood meals. Dogs, both domestic and wild, act as reservoir hosts for this pathogen and are the primary hosts of brown dog ticks. Brown dog ticks become carriers of the pathogen when they take a blood meal from a rickessemic dog. Stored in the midgut and salivary glands of an infected tick, E. canis is transferred by the saliva of ticks carrying the pathogen to hosts during blood meals. If infected while in the larval stage, the tick retains the pathogen through the next two life stages and can infect hosts during blood meals in both the nymphal and adult stages in transstadial transmission.

Because the vector of E. canis uses canine species as a primary host, this bacterium is most commonly associated with dogs, but multiple human cases have been reported. Additionally, some cats have been found to have antibodies to E. canis suggesting that it can occasionally infect cats, as well.

== Pathogenesis ==
E. canis is a small, Gram-negative coccus bacterium with a single circular chromosome. Minute in size, E. canis is smaller than the other species in the genus Ehrlichia.

The cell walls of this organism lack peptidoglycans and lipopolysaccharides typically present in at least small amounts in most other Gram-negative bacteria, which is believed to contribute to its ability to resist the immune response of the host. The lack of these two materials reduces the rigidity of the cell wall, allowing the cell wall's exterior to be dynamic, in turn facilitating the E. canis cells’ evasion of antibodies in its host organism's body.

The cells of E. canis lack complex internal structures, which allow the synthesis of sugars and it, in turn, uses amino acids as its source of energy.

Upon introduction, E. canis penetrates the monocytes and macrophages of hosts. The infection may leave a host asymptomatic for months or else severe clinical signs may manifest as ehrlichiosis develops.

== Diagnosis and treatment ==
Animals infected with E. canis may experience a combination of signs, including fever, lethargy, weight loss, lymphadenopathy, edema of the appendages, discharge from nose and eyes, and seizures. A low packed cell volume in the blood is a common indicator of the presence of E. canis and a blood smear can be done to determine if morulae are present in leukocytes to definitively diagnose the infection. Because this process is often long and tedious, the presence of antibodies to E. canis in blood can be used to effectively diagnose a patient. These antibodies typically appear within seven days after infection.

E. canis is commonly treated via chemoprophylaxis with doxycycline, a prescription drug used in the treatment of bacterial infections. If caught before the clinical stage, E. canis is almost completely curable, but prolonged presence of the bacteria leads to hemorrhaging, which typically results in the death of the patient.

Although no vaccine is known to be on the market for ehrlichiosis caused by E. canis, extensive research on the use of an attenuated strain of E. canis as an aid in the prevention of E. canis infection is being performed. Preliminary testing has proved that this method may be effective, as clinical signs and the presence of the E. canis bacteria were reduced in Beagle test subjects, but further investigations are necessary before a vaccine can be marketed.
