= Daju peoples =

Ethnic group in Sudan and Chad

The Daju people are a group of seven distinct ethnicities speaking related languages (see Daju languages) living on both sides of the Chad–Sudan border and in the Nuba Mountains. Separated by distance and speaking different languages, at present, they generally have little cultural affinity to each other.

The traditional area identified with the Daju are the Daju Hills in the southern portion of the Marrah Mountains located in the Darfur province of Sudan. As the Marrah Mountains are the only area in Darfur that has a temperate climate and thus could support large populations, a Daju state arose perhaps as early as the 12th century. Very little is known of this kingdom except for a list of kings and several mentions in Egyptian texts. The most ancient mention of king's names is king Githar at the time of the Daju prophet Saleh who died and was buried at the bank of Wadi Saleh in the southwestern corner of Marrah Mountains. The Daju appear to be the dominant group in Darfur from earliest times vying for control with their northern Marrah Mountain later rivals, the agricultural Fur people. The original settlement of the Daju people was in the Yellow Nile River [now called Wadi Howar]. They also left ruins at Jebel Meidob, the Great Oases and Darb el-Arbayyn trade route to Egypt.

== Origins ==
The Daju, who known to Henri Barth as "Pharaoh's Folk", had migrated originally from the Nile valley in the aftermath of the invasion of Kingdom of Meroe by Izana, king of Axum around the middle of the fourth century A.D. Accounts refer their origins to Shendi, which means in their own language "ewe." First they settled in Wadi al-Malik, Wadi Howar and Jebel Midob in B.C. 3000 then migrated, due to climate change, to the Nile valley and Egypt where they ruled under the name of Libyan Pharaohs. An Iraqi King expelled them southwards where they returned to their capital Nepta. Then they have been driven southwards again to Meroe until Izana drove them westwards to Wadi Howar and Kordofan in western Sudan and there they established their capital towns around Jebel Qadir in the Nuba Mountains and many other towns now in Darfur and Chad. After several generations, they annexed the land now called Dar Fur and beyond. Historians attribute this later expansion to the war between the Daju kingdom and the Kingdom of Dongola in 1100 AD which led King Ahmed al-Daj to relocate his headquarters to Meri in Jebel Marra massif. Meanwhile, Semia, one of Daju capitals, was completely destroyed by the Amir from Dongola.

== History ==
The Daju empire is said to have spread its control as far east as Kurdufan, west of the Nuba Mountains and as far west as Chad. The Egyptian historian Al-Maqrizi, writing about 1400, described "Taju" as being a fairly powerful kingdom lying between Kanem and the Nile kingdoms. The Daju people are said to have settled in a long belt stretching from South Kurdufan westward through Darfur and into Chad.

According to tradition, the Daju dynasty was conquered by the Sokoro-speaking Tunjur people in the 14th century who moved from the west via the kingdoms of Bornu and Wadai. The Daju were scattered with their king escaping westward with some of his people and establishing a small new kingdom in the Dar Sila Area in Chad, becoming the Dar Sila Daju people.

Other Daju moved eastward eventually settling in what is now South Kurdufan province near Muglad just north of Abyei and west of the Nuba Mountains. Records indicate that they consisted of two distinct Daju groups although it is uncertain if this migration displaced pre-existing non-Daju peoples or if one of the Daju groups was already indigenous to the area. There is one source that indicates that both the Ngok Dinka to the South and the Messiria to the North admit that the Daju were the indigenous people of Muglad. They were eventually displaced by the Messiria pushing down from the north and were forced south into Abyei where they were defeated and again dispersed by the Ngok Dinka. One group was driven westward (possibly the ancestors of the Njalgulgule people) and the other group, consisting of Dar Fur Daju, were driven east into the Nuba Hills settling near Lagowa where they developed their own distinct dialect of the Nyala language.

Over time, the Tunjur introduced Islam to the region (which had previously been pagan) and gradually adopted Arabic as their administrative language. In 1596, control of Darfur passed into the hands of the hybrid Keira dynasty through intermarriage between the last sultan of the ruling Tunjur dynasty, Ahmad al-Maqur and its more populous vassals the Fur people. The resulting Fur-dominated Darfur Sultanate continued on until 1898.

== Geography ==
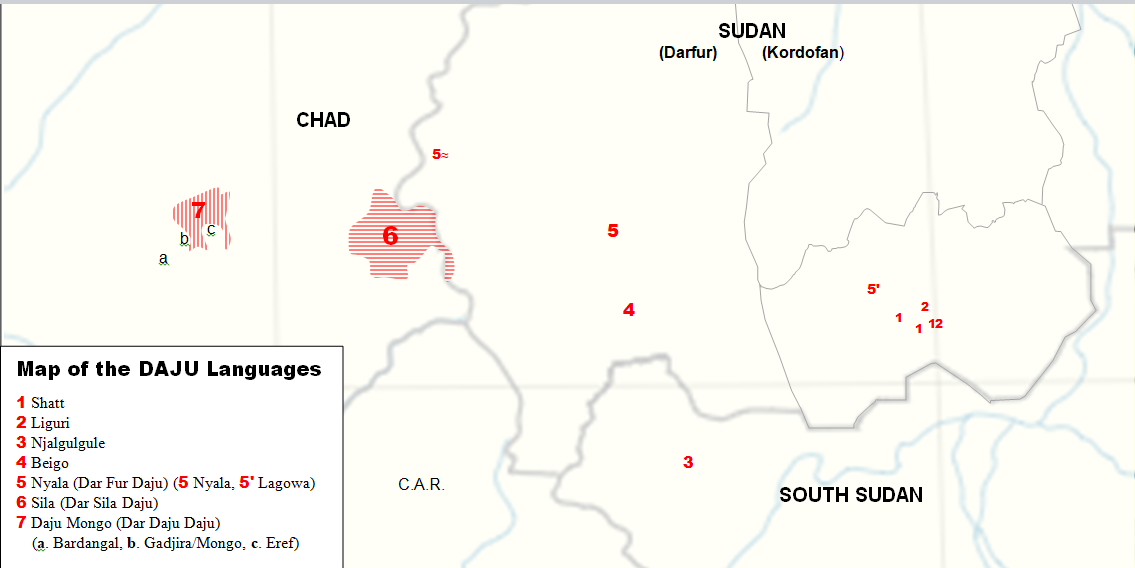
Map showing the extent of the Daju-speaking groups

As a result of their defeat at the hands of the Tunjur and then dominance by the Fur, the Daju were displaced from much of their territory and now exist in several distinct pockets in the Sudan and Chad.

The remaining Daju people exist in the following distinct groups:

- Beygo numbering 850 (1978) living in Southern Darfur in the Sudan southeast of Nyala in the hills east of Kube. The Beygo language is now extinct with most of the remaining population speaking Arabic
- Dar Daju Daju numbering 34,000 (1993) and living in the Guéra Region of Chad. They speak the Daju Mongo language.
- Dar Fur Daju numbering 80,000 (2007) and living in Southern Darfur in the Sudan in the Daju Hills 40 km northeast of Nyala. They speak the Nyala language. Much of this population has fled to Chad as a result of the Darfur Conflict. There is also a small population of Dar Fur Daju near the city of Lagowa in the Nuba Hills.
- Dar Sila Daju numbering 63,100 (2000) and living in southern Chad in the Ouaddai region. They speak the Sila language.
- Njalgulgule numbering 900 (1977) and living in one village in Western Bahr el Ghazal, South Sudan near the confluence of the Sopo River and Boro River. They speak the Njalgulgule language. They are likely a later out-migration resulting from the collapse of the Daju empire.

Linguistic map of the non-Arab people of Darfur

There are also two groups located in the Nuba Mountains and due to their sharp linguistic differential from each other as well as the other Daju languages, it is generally agreed that they come from a very early migration (perhaps 2,000 years ago) out of the Daju Urheimat in the Marrah Mountains. There they carved out their own small territory in the midst of the original inhabitants of the eastern Nuba Mountains, the Kordofanian tribes, as well as amongst later migrating tribal/linguistic groupings: the Nyimang tribes, the Temein tribes, and the Kadugli tribes. The migration of the Hill Nubian tribes in the Nuba Hills is generally seen as coming after the main Daju migration. The Nuba Mountains have generally been an area of "retreat" for persecuted groups seeking security hence the significant linguistic diversity.

- Logorik numbering 2,000 (1971) and living in the central Nuba Mountains. They speak the Liguri language.
- Shatt number 15,000 (1984) and living in the Nuba Hills southeast of the capital Kadugli. They speak the Shatt language. Furthermore, the Jukun and the Yoruba claim contact with the Daju.

== Culture ==
The Daju are primarily grain farmers (mainly millet, sorghum, and corn). Secondarily, they hunt as well as gather (mainly honey, berries and wild fruits). Women perform much of the daily work. They plant and sow the crops, ground the grain, and cook the meals. They are also the primary house-builders. The typical Daju home is round with a cone roof although in the towns, houses are often rectangular. Community chores are shared. Traditionally, Daju women tattoo their eyelids, gums, and lips with acacia thorns. Fighters tattoo their left-hand peaks with sacred black and red ink.

The Dar Sila Daju in Chad are arranged by male-led clans. Each clan has its own separate role in society. The Sultan is chosen from one of the clans and his advisors are drawn from other clans. The Sultanship primarily serves the role of religious leader.

The Dar Daju Daju and the Dar Sila Daju are predominantly Muslim but they still practice many of their traditional religious customs including the building of straw shrines to their high god Kalge whom they equate with Allah of Islam. From this name derived ″Par-Kalge,″ the sacred mountain located near Napta. The Dar Fur Daju maintain their old and original religion. Islam became the religion of most Daju by the 15th century but it's likey that Islam spread significantly before this date.
