= Anaplasma bovis =

Scientific classification
- Domain: Bacteria
- Kingdom: Pseudomonadati
- Phylum: Pseudomonadota
- Class: Alphaproteobacteria
- Subclass: "Rickettsidae"
- Order: Rickettsiales
- Family: Ehrlichiaceae
- Genus: Anaplasma
- Species: A. bovis

Binomial name
- Anaplasma bovis Dumler et al. 2001

Species of bacterium

Anaplasma bovis is a gram negative, obligate intracellular bacterium, which can be found in wild and domestic ruminants, and potentially a wide variety of other species. It is one of the last species of the family Anaplasmaceae (formerly Ehrlichiaceae) to be formally described. It preferentially infects host monocytes, and is often diagnosed via blood smears, polymerase chain reaction (PCR), and enzyme-linked immunosorbent assay (ELISA). A. bovis is not currently considered zoonotic, and does not frequently cause serious clinical disease in its host (although clinical disease has been noted in calves). This organism is transmitted by tick vectors, so tick bite prevention is the mainstay of A. bovis control, although clinical infections can be treated with tetracyclines. This organism has a global distribution, with infections noted in many areas, including Korea, Japan, Europe, Brazil, Africa, and North America.

== History and taxonomy ==
The clinical syndrome which is now linked to members of the genus Anaplasma has been reported since 1780, although at the time, the actual pathogenic agent was not yet known. In the early 1900s, many other members of this genus were described and determined to be the causative agent of anaplasmosis in a wide variety of domestic and wildlife species. Anaplasma bovis itself, was first identified in 1936, in cattle hosts.

With the development of more sensitive molecular methods, there has been a drastic reorganization in the taxonomic classifications of Rickettsial organisms within the past 20 years. Generally, these organisms are grouped according to morphology, ecology, epidemiology, and clinical characteristics. Under the previous taxonomic organization, the order contained two families: Rickettsialaceae and Ehrlicheae. In the dramatic reorganization that occurred in 2001, the family Ehrlichiaceae was replaced by family Anaplasmaceae, and via molecular phylogenetic analyses, the genera within these classes were redistributed based on genetic similarities. The current taxonomic organization includes the genera Anaplasma, Ehrlichia, Wolbachia, and Neorickettsia within the family Anaplasmaceae, and the genera Rickettsia and Orientia within the family Rickettsiaceae.

Anaplasma bovis is currently one of six recognized species within the genus Anaplasma. Other members of this genus include the species A. phagocytophilum, A. marginale, A. platys, A. ovis, and A. centrale.

== Morphological characteristics ==
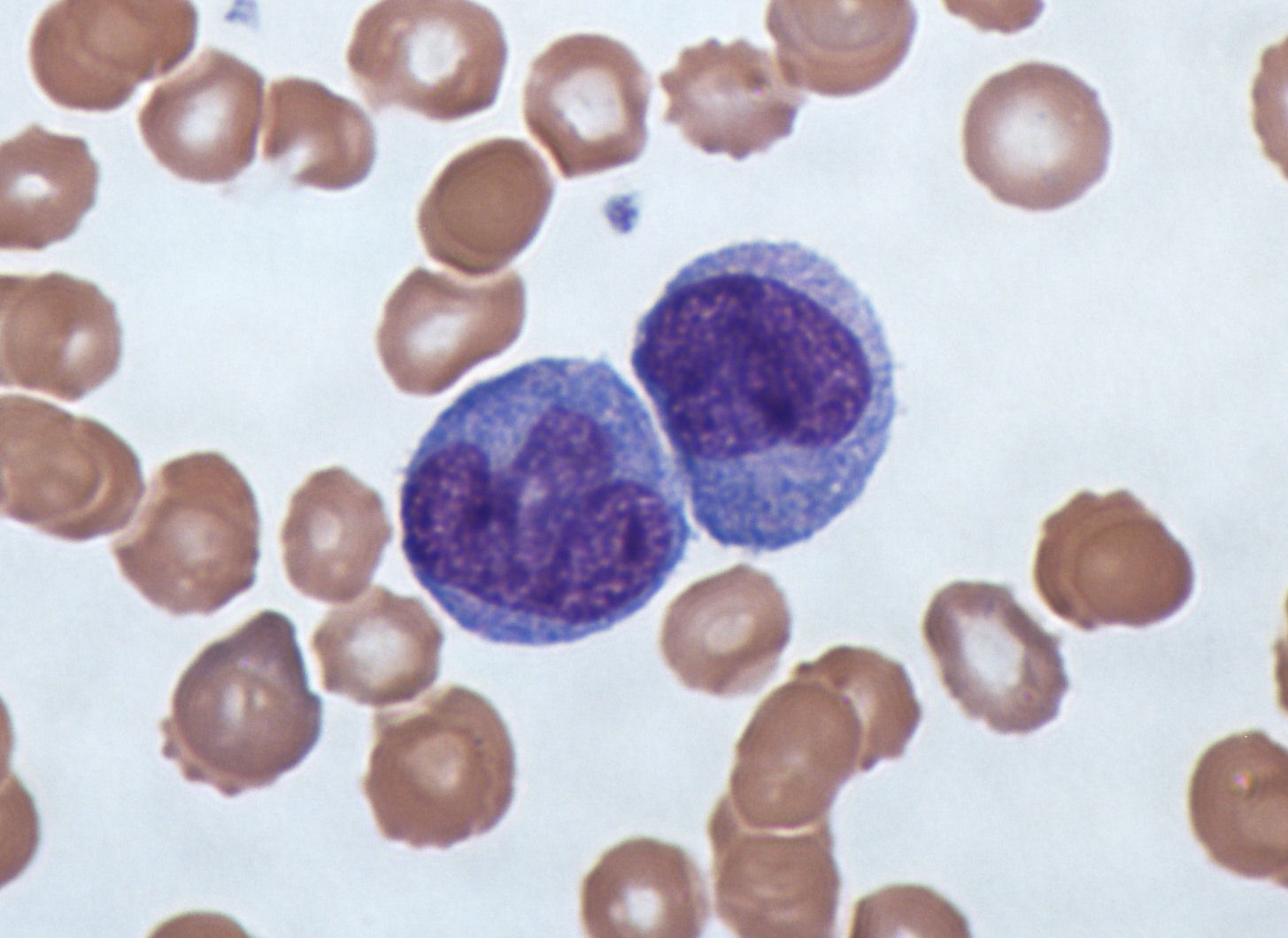
A typical (uninfected) monocyte on blood smear

Anaplasma bovis is a gram negative obligate intracellular bacteria. The bacteria lives within the mononuclear cells of cattle, specifically monocytes. When the bacteria is suspected you can take a blood smear and observe the cells for presence of A. bovis within. Commonly observed forms on a blood smear are small spherical bodies within monocytes that can measure from 0.5 to 6 μm. The morulae have acidophilic shades including pale red, dark purple, light purple and pink. A study by Prasath, N.B. et, al. showed that about 80% of monocytes contained inclusion bodies in an infected Jersey cow.

== Epidemiology ==
=== Geographic distribution ===
Anaplasma bovis has a large geographic distribution affecting many different countries across the world. It has been detected in Brazil, North America, Africa, Japan, China, Pakistan, Israel and Korea. Anaplasma bovis has the highest reporting in cattle, goats, and wild deer. Cattle and Buffalo have been infected by A. bovis in Africa, South America, the Middle East and Japan. Geographic distribution is largely influenced by season, climate and weather due to changes in tick population and distribution. A. bovis has been found across the world in many different countries, having a significant impact on animal production and the health of wildlife species. Research is limited on the prevalence and geographic distribution of A. bovis within specific countries, so provides an area for further development within the literature.

==== North Africa ====
DNA of A. bovis has been reported in domestic species such as cattle, sheep and goats. The highest infection rate of A. bovis in North Africa is reported in sheep at 42.7% of the population.

==== Japan and Korea ====
Anaplasma bovis has also been detected in deer from Japan and Korea. Research on the Japanese islands of Hokkaido and Honshu has shown the prevalence of A. bovis in Hemaphysalis longicornis ticks on Honshu island. Detection of A. bovis DNA was also found from blood samples of native wild deer on both islands. Anaplasma bovis has also been detected in dogs and cats in Japan.

==== China and Taiwan ====
Research has shown that A. bovis has been detected in areas of China. A study done in Chongqing, China determined that the prevalence of A. bovis within a sample population was 8.4% using blood sample collection and DNA extraction. A. bovis has also been detected in small mammals in Taiwan.

==== Canada ====
Although further research must be done to determine the prevalence of A. bovis in Canada, the bacteria has been isolated from D. andersoni type ticks in Southern Saskatchewan and Alberta.

==== Israel ====
Research regarding the distribution of many tick vector pathogens in Israel has shown that A. bovis can be isolated from R. sanguineus and R. turanicus ticks.

==== Pakistan ====
Anaplasma bovis was isolated in asymptomatic tick infested cattle by taking blood samples, detecting the presence of Anaplasma by PCR methods and then analyzing the positive samples for differences in genetics. The prevalence of A.bovis within the sample population was 7.78%.

=== Transmission and risk factors ===
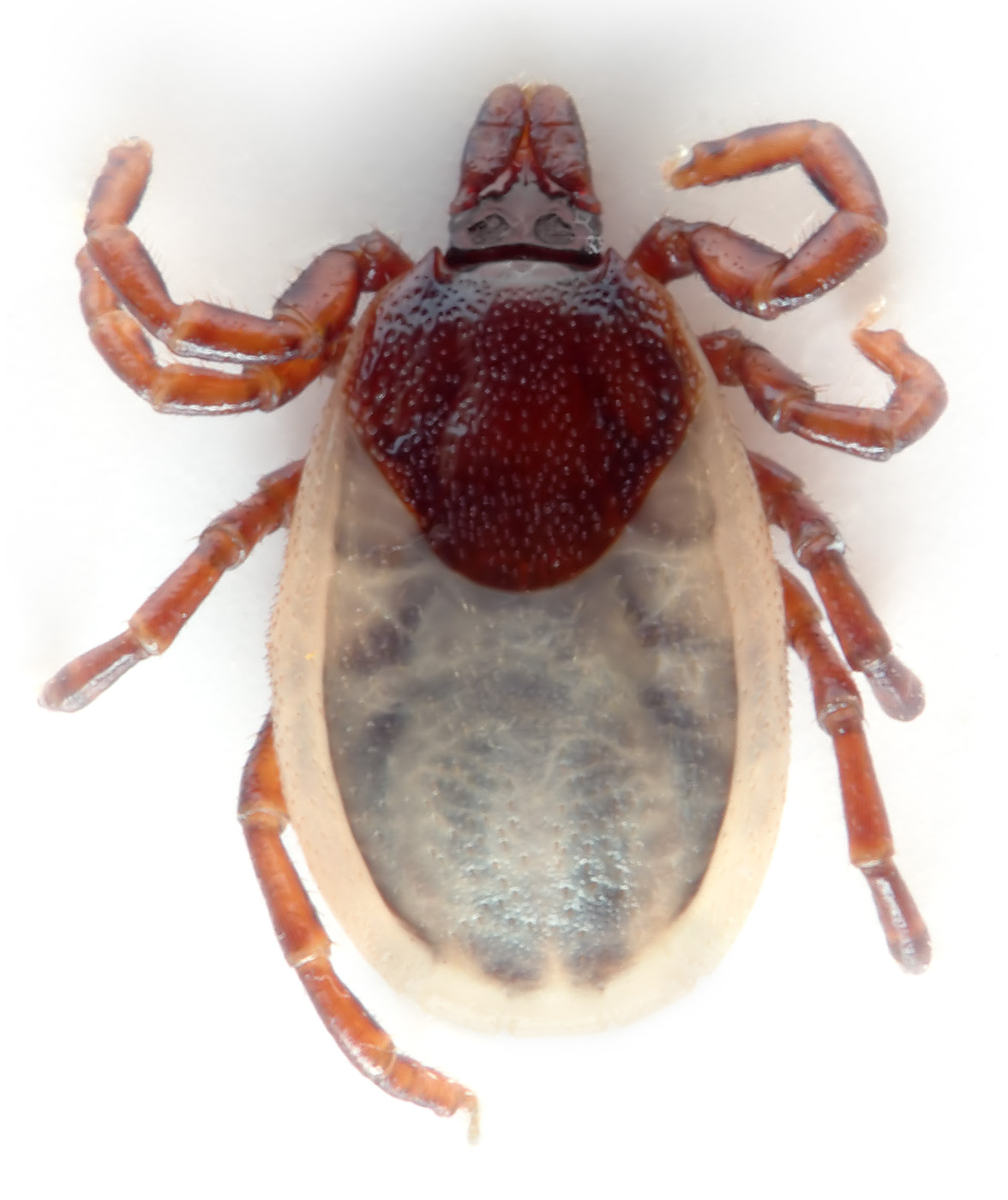
An adult Ixodes tick

Anaplasma bovis is spread from host to host by tick vectors, specifically from the genera Ixodes, Dermacentor, Rhipicephalus, and Amblyomma. The tick consumes a blood meal from an infected cattle host, taking up the bacteria. A. bovis can then be transmitted to a different animal when the tick goes on to take another blood meal from a susceptible bovine.

In assessing risk factors for infection with Anaplasma, it was found that breed, location, sex, and season impact prevalence rates. Exotic goat breeds were found to have higher prevalence rates when compared to indigenous breeds. In the summer, cattle and sheep have greater infections, compared to goats having greater infections in autumn. Further, it was found that goats in a sub-humid area had significantly greater infections, and prevalence rate varied with differences in goat and sheep flocks.

=== Virulence factors ===
As an obligate intracellular pathogen, A. bovis exhibits cell and tissue tropism by preferentially infecting monocytes. However, more specific virulence factors have not been identified, and presentation of A. bovis in monocytes can vary.

== Clinical significance ==
=== Cattle ===
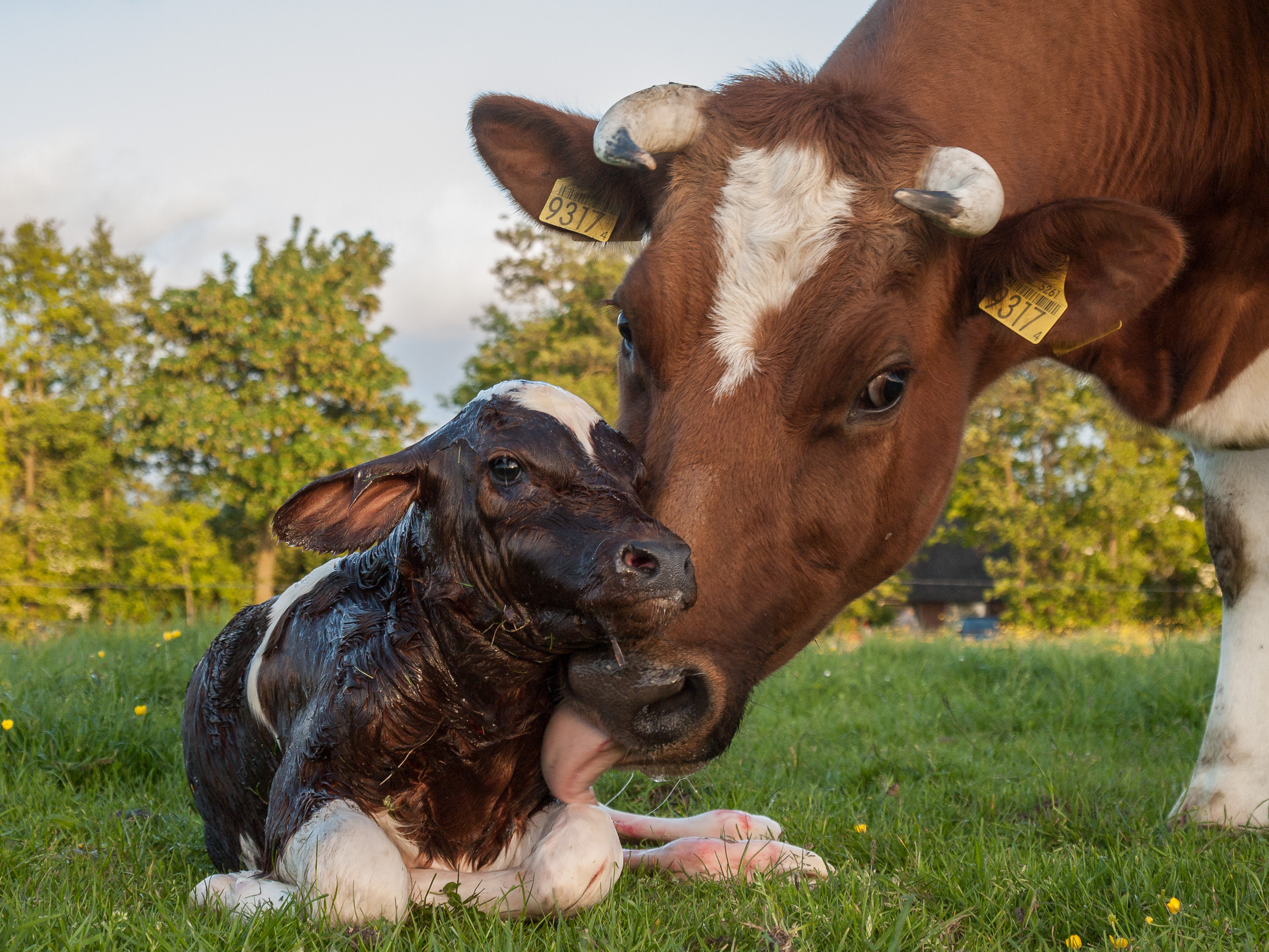
Domestic cattle

Infection with Anaplasma bovis causes a disease known as monocytic anaplasmosis in cattle. Infection is characterized by invasion of the organism into white blood cells called monocytes. Infection with A. bovis in cattle is considered to be asymptomatic in most cases. The OIE reports that A. bovis does not cause disease, however case reports of clinical illness do exist. Clinical disease is most likely to be detected in calves. Clinically apparent infection manifests as a febrile illness with enlarged prescapular lymph nodes, mucous discharge, and pale mucous membranes. Anaplasmosis is also known to be a production limiting disease resulting in decreased milk production and weight loss. Other species of Anaplasma, most commonly A. marginale, are well documented to cause disease in cattle.

=== Other species ===
Anaplasma species typically infect ruminants. A. bovis may also infect various types of deer, buffalo, goats, cottontail rabbits, racoons, and dogs. There is a case report in the literature of infection with A. bovis in a horse. The horse presented with anorexia, low body condition, lethargy, and was febrile. A. bovis is not known to be transmissible to people and as such does not have zoonotic potential.

DNA fragments of A. bovis have also been reported to be found in deer, raccoons, dogs, domestic cats, Hokkaido brown bear, and wildcats in Japan.

== Diagnosis, prevention, and treatment ==
Diagnosis of Anaplasma infections relies mainly on visual inspection of blood smears along with molecular methods such as PCR and ELISA. On blood smears, bacterial inclusions within monocytes may be visible. Live vaccines against other species of Anaplasma exist, however due to the low pathogenicity of A. bovis, there is no specific vaccine for this species. Prevention of tick bites using environmental control and parasiticides helps to prevent transmission of the organism. Tetracycline antibiotics are typically used to treat clinical anaplasmosis.
