= Shatt =

Shatt may refer to:

- the Shatt people
- the Shatt language
- the Shatt al-Arab river, which empties into the Persian Gulf
- Chott
