= Logorik =

Logorik may be,

- Logorik people
- Logorik language
