= Anaplasmosis =

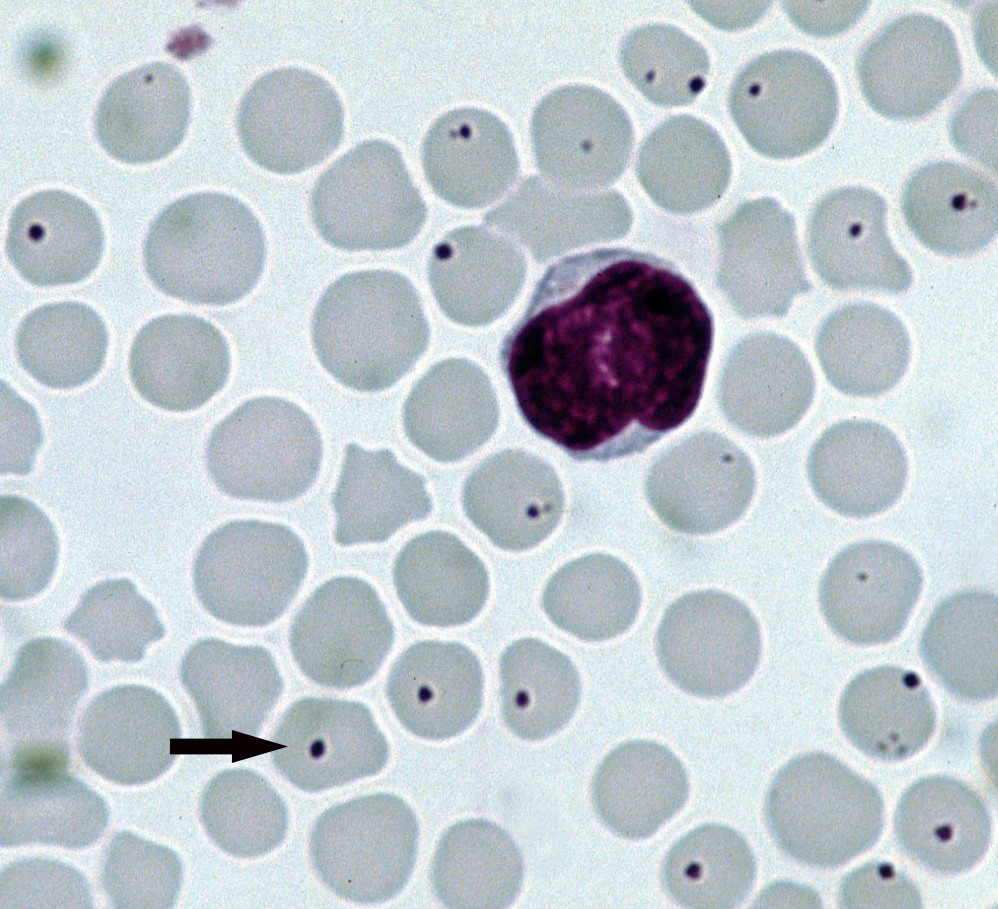
- Anaplasma centrale infecting the red blood cells of a cow: The arrow points to a typical infected cell.
- Specialty: Veterinary medicine

Anaplasmosis is a tick-borne disease affecting ruminants, dogs, and horses, and is caused by Anaplasma bacteria. Anaplasmosis is an infectious but not contagious disease transmitted through mechanical and biological vector processes. Also referred to as "yellow bag" or "yellow fever" because the infected animal can develop a jaundiced look, other signs of infection include weight loss, diarrhea, paleness of the skin, aggressive behavior, and high fever.

Many different tick species can carry the bacteria that cause anaplasmosis. The two major bacterial pathogens are Anaplasma marginale and Anaplasma phagocytophilum. These microorganisms are Gram-negative, and infect red blood cells. Once the host is infected with anaplasmosis, the immune system will try to fight off and kill the infected red blood cells, but will also kill healthy red blood cells. The Anaplasma sparouinense species is responsible for a rare zoonosis, the Sparouine anaplasmosis, detected only in French Guiana, South America. This disease was described from a clandestine gold miner working deep in rainforest. Infection of his red blood cells led to a severe deterioration of his health and required his hospitalization. Molecular typing showed that Anaplasma sparouinense is distinct from all known species and more genetically related to recently described Anaplasma species causing infections in rainforest wild fauna of Brazil.

While there are no current live or inactivated vaccines effective for all strains of A. marginale approved by the USDA for anaplasmosis, there are other means of prevention. Tick and fly control for herds of ruminants can be effective, but also labor-intensive. Chemical methods can also be used, including sanitizing surgical equipment after each use. Tetracycline drugs are the most common treatment for anaplasmosis, and can provide the animal with immunity for some time. The disease is more common in the upper Midwest and Northeastern parts of the United States.

== Transmission ==
Mechanical and biological vector transmission work in different ways, but both lead to infection of the red blood cells. Mechanical transmission happens in two ways: one when red blood cells are inoculated with the blood parasite through surgical equipment, including needles, dehorners, ear taggers, castrating knives, and tattoo instruments. Another mechanical transmission mode is through the mouthparts of biting flies that carry an Anaplasma species of blood parasite.

Biological vector transmission is through ticks that carry a blood parasite able to cause anaplasmosis. The most common Anaplasmosis-causing tick is Ixodes scapularis, also known as the black-legged tick or the deer tick. Ticks who contain species of many different Anaplasma species can transmit this disease through a bite. The blood parasite survives and can multiply in the tick, and can sit dormant for months without being transmitted to an animal. When bitten by a tick carrying a blood parasite, the blood parasite can then enter the new host and cause infection.

Once infected with a species of Anaplasma, the parasite multiplies in the bloodstream and attaches to red blood cells. The immune system will attempt to kill the infected blood cells, but will also kill uninfected red blood cells in the process. The number of red blood cells being destroyed becomes larger than new red blood cells being made, causing the host to become anemic and leading to many other symptoms. Once infected with anaplasmosis, the cattle will always be carriers of the infectious disease, and calves born from carriers will also carry the disease.

== Signs and symptoms ==
Classic signs and symptoms of anaplasmosis will not occur until 3–6 weeks after infection. The most common symptoms of anaplasmosis include fever, a decreased number of white blood cells, platelets in the bloodstream, and abnormally elevated levels of liver enzymes. The erythema chronicum migrans rash may be seen with anaplasmosis, as it is co-transmitted in 10% of Lyme disease cases.

Anemia may be severe and result in cardiovascular changes such as an increase in heart rate. Blood in the urine may occur due to the lysis of red blood cells. General systemic signs include diarrhea, anorexia, and weight loss. Infected animals may develop a jaundiced look, which then turns into paleness around the eyes, muzzle, lips, and teats of the cattle.

All cattle are susceptible to infection by Anaplasma marginale, but the severity worsens with age. Older cattle tend to exhibit the most severe clinical symptoms; cattle aged 1–3 may also show severe symptoms, but can recover more easily.

== Causes ==
The two major species that cause anaplasmosis in ruminants include Anaplasma marginale and Anaplasma phagocytophilum. Anaplasma marginale is found worldwide and is transmitted by Rhipicephalus ticks. Anaplasma phagocytophilum is also found worldwide, mainly transmitted by Ixodes ticks. Other species that cause anaplasmosis in specific species include:

- Cattle:
  - Anaplasma centrale – found mainly in South America, Africa and the Middle East
- Sheep and goats:
  - Anaplasma ovis – found worldwide. There is a prevalence of 82.9% in sheep, and 74.9% in goats. This species is the most prevalent for causing anaplasmosis in sheep and goats, although Anaplasma phagocytophilium can also cause the disease. Anaplasma phagocytophilium has a prevalence of 11.9% in sheep, and 15.2% in goats, and also causes the human zoonotic disease granulocytic anaplasmosis.

== Morphology ==
There are many strains of Anaplasma marginale, all with differing morphology, antigenic properties, protein sequence, and ability to be transmitted by ticks. Major surface proteins (MSPs) have been found to play a major role in the infection by Anaplasma marginale. Out of the six MSPs found on this species, three of the major surface proteins do not seem to differ between all strains, including MSP1a, MSP4, and MSP5. The msp1a gene, which codes for MSP1a, is used as a marker for the identification of Anaplasma marginale because it has been shown to be conserved in the multiplication of rickettsia in cattle and ticks and has been shown to be involved in adhesion to bovine erythrocytes and tick cells.

Anaplasma phagocytophilum is a gram-negative bacterium that does not have lipopolysaccharides or peptidoglycan. The outer membrane does not have a capsule and is coarse with irregular periplasmic spaces. This species was originally included in the genus Ehrlichia (Ehrlichia phagocytophilium), but is now included in the genus Anaplasma (Anaplasma phagocytophilium).

== Prevention ==
Currently, no live or inactivated vaccines have been approved by the USDA that are effective against all strains of A. marginale. Some vaccines that rely on erythrocyte-derived antigen sources provide immunity or prevent clinical disease, although these do not prevent cattle from being infected with A. marginale. Other means of prevention can include testing all ruminants in a herd and eliminating any individuals who test positive for anaplasmosis, leading to an anaplasmosis-free herd. Vector control measures can also be used. Tick control is widely used in some countries, including Africa, but is rarely used in the United States due to the fact that this prevention method is labor-intensive and expensive. In contrast, the control of flies is effective, and there are many ways to do this. Chemical agents can be used, sanitation methods (such as cleaning stalls/pens regularly, manure management, and protecting feed), as well as biological control by natural enemies of flies (including bees, mites, parasitoids). Ways to prevent iatrogenic transmission include avoiding the re-use of needles and sanitizing medical equipment between uses. Antimicrobial treatment can also be used, although it is more commonly used in the case of active infection. This includes the drugs tetracycline and imidocarb, and is used in healthy ruminants to decrease the clinical effects of an active infection.

== Treatment ==
The most common source of treatment is the use of tetracycline drugs (including tetracycline, chlortetracycline, oxytetracycline, rolitetracycline, doxycycline, and minocycline) and imidocarb. An injection of tetracycline drugs can give ruminants immunity to Anaplasma species for at least eight months. Imidocarb has been shown to be highly effective against Anaplasma marginale, but has been identified as a possible carcinogen and is not approved in the United States or Europe. Live vaccines containing infectious Anaplasma centrale to prevent infection of Anaplasma marginale have been used in South Africa, Australia, Israel, and South America. Live vaccines are prohibited in the United States, and there has been production of vaccines consisting of nonliving Anaplasma marginale pulled from infected bovine erythrocytes, which can provide some immunity but leaves cattle susceptible to other strains of Anaplasma marginale. Supportive therapy such as blood products and fluids may be necessary.

== Epidemiology ==
In the United States, anaplasmosis is notably present in the upper Midwest and Northeast, where the tick hosts, Ixodes spp., are primarily found. It is also a seemingly increasing antibody in humans in Europe. Although vaccines have been developed, none are currently available in the United States. Early in the 20th century, this disease was considered one of the major economic consequences in the Western United States. In the 1980s and 1990s, control of ticks through new acaricides and practical treatment with prolonged-action antibiotics, notably tetracycline, has led to the point where the disease is no longer considered a major problem. The disease affects immunoglobulin G; therefore, G-specific antibody levels can be used to diagnose the disease.

In 2005, A. ovis was found in reindeer populations in Mongolia. This pathogen and its associated syndrome (characterized by lethargy, fever, and pale mucous membranes) was previously observed in only wild sheep and goats in the region, and is the first observed occurrence of A. ovis in reindeer.

In Australia, bovine anaplasmosis, caused by A. marginale, is found in only the northern and eastern parts of Australia where the cattle tick is present. It was probably introduced as early as 1829 by cattle from Indonesia infested with the cattle tick Boophilus microplus.

The veterinarian George P. Broussard of New Iberia, Louisiana, conducted important research on anaplasmosis and brucellosis.
