= Dar Fur Daju people =

Linguistic map of the non-Arab peoples of Darfur.

The Dar Fur Daju are an ethnic group in the Sudan. They are one of seven distinct ethnicities comprising the Daju people. They speak the Nyala language. They live in Southern Darfur in the Sudan in the Daju Hills 40 km northeast of Nyala - although most of this population has fled to Chad as a result of the Darfur Conflict. There is also a small population of Dar Fur Daju near the city of Lagowa in the Nuba Hills. Their total population numbered 90,000 in 1984.

== External sources ==
- Language Map of Sudan Huffman, Steve
