= Sila language =

Sila may refer to:

- Sila language (Chad)
- Sila language (Sino-Tibetan), of Vietnam and Laos

== See also ==
- Silla language
