= Baygo people =

Daju ethnic group in Sudan

Baygo is an ethnic group of Sudan. They are one of seven distinct ethnicities comprising the Daju people. Their original language, the Baygo language, is now extinct and the population now speaks Sudanese Arabic. Baygo is said to come from Southern Sudan as slaves and were freed by a Fur sultan. Their name originates from The Fur Sultans mother named Baygo. The population of the group numbered 850 in 1978. They live to the southeast of Nyala, the capital of South Darfur state in the western part of Sudan. They are mostly Muslim.
