= Dar Daju Daju people =

The Dar Daju Daju are an ethnic group numbering 34,000 people in the Guéra Region of southwestern Chad. They are one of seven distinct ethnicities comprising the Daju people. They speak the Daju Mongo language and are mostly Muslim.
