= Ngulgule people =

Ngulgule is an ethnic group of South Sudan living in Western Bahr el Ghazal just north of the confluence of the Sopo and Boro rivers. They are one of seven distinct ethnicities comprising the Daju people. They speak Njalgulgule, a Nilo-Saharan language. Most of them are Muslims. The population of this group is 900.

== External sources ==
- Language Map of Sudan Huffman, Steve
