= Shatt people =

Total population
- 30,000 in 2011

Languages
- Shatt

Religion
- Sunni Islam

Related ethnic groups
- Logorik

Shatt is an ethnic group in Sudan located in the northern Shatt Hills southwest of Kadugli in South Kordofan State (Shatt Daman, Shatt Safia, Shatt Tebeldia) and in the Abu Hashim and Abu Sinam areas. They refer to themselves as the Caning people. They are one of seven distinct ethnicities comprising the Daju people. They speak Shatt, a Nilo-Saharan language. Most members of this ethnic group are Muslims. The population of the Shatt numbered 30,000 in 2011.

== External sources ==
- Gurtong Peace project: "Shatt (Thuri)"
- Language Map of Sudan Huffman, Steve
