= Anaplasma sparouinense =

Scientific classification (Candidatus)
- Domain: Bacteria
- Kingdom: Pseudomonadati
- Phylum: Pseudomonadota
- Class: Alphaproteobacteria
- Order: Rickettsiales
- Family: Ehrlichiaceae
- Genus: Anaplasma
- Species: "Ca. A. sparouinense"

Binomial name
- "Candidatus Anaplasma sparouinense" Duron et al. 2022

Intracellular bacterial pathogen

"Candidatus Anaplasma sparouinense" is an emerging intracellular bacterial pathogen.

== Description ==
Ca. Anaplasma sparouinense was first detected in a 58-year-old man living in the rainforest of French Guiana. The patient had a history of splenectomy due to malaria attacks caused by Plasmodium vivax and showed anemia upon initial exam. Examination of the patient's Giemsa-stained blood film taken for malaria diagnosis revealed the presence of intraerythrocytic bodies. Sequencing analysis found the organism was most closely related to Ca. Anaplasma amazonensis, a bacterium which infects sloths and cats.

== Disease ==
Unlike the type species of its genus, Anaplasma phagocytophilum, which primarily infects neutrophils, Ca. A. sparouinense appears to infect red blood cells.
