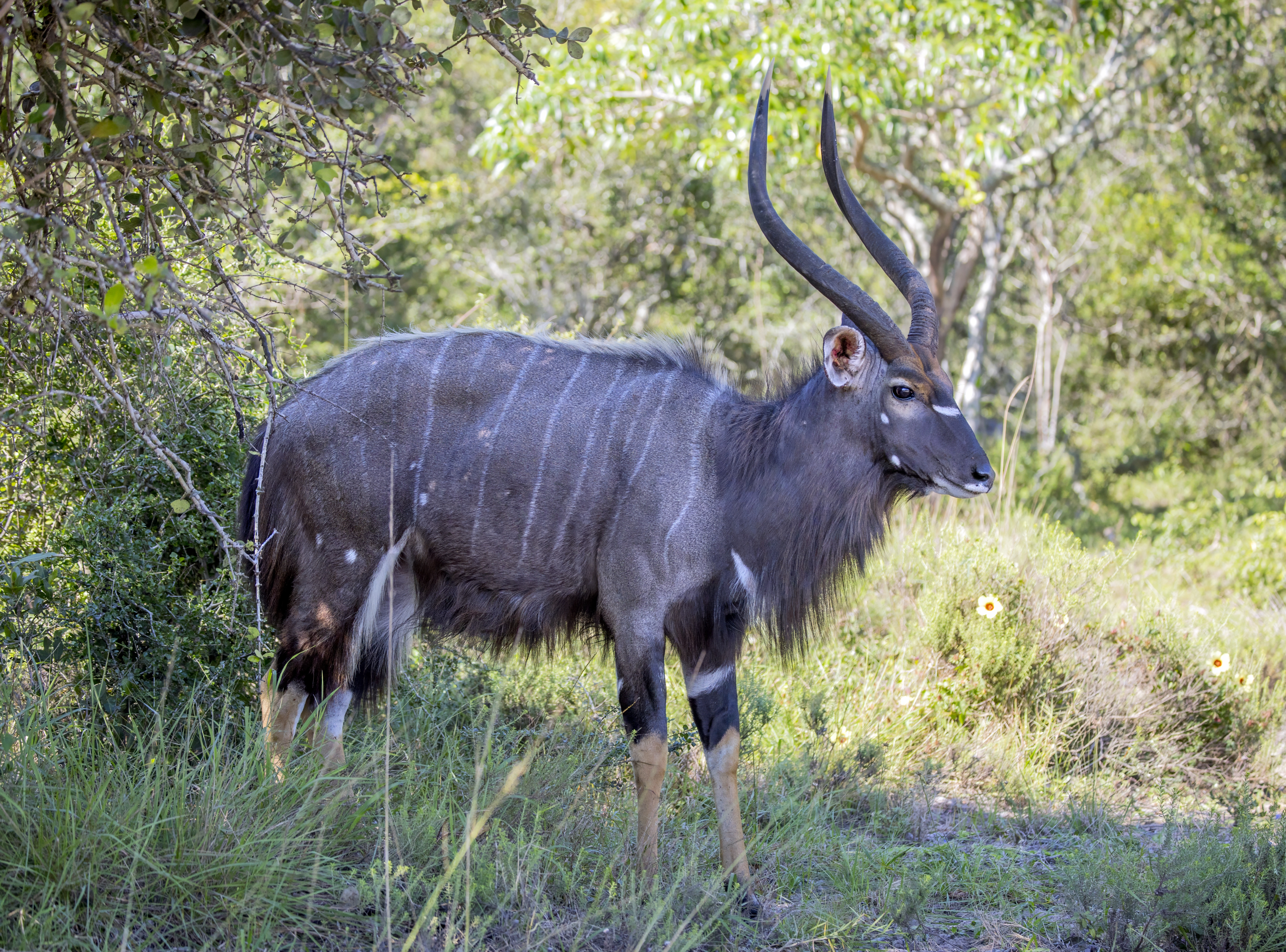
- Male in Maputo National Park, Mozambique
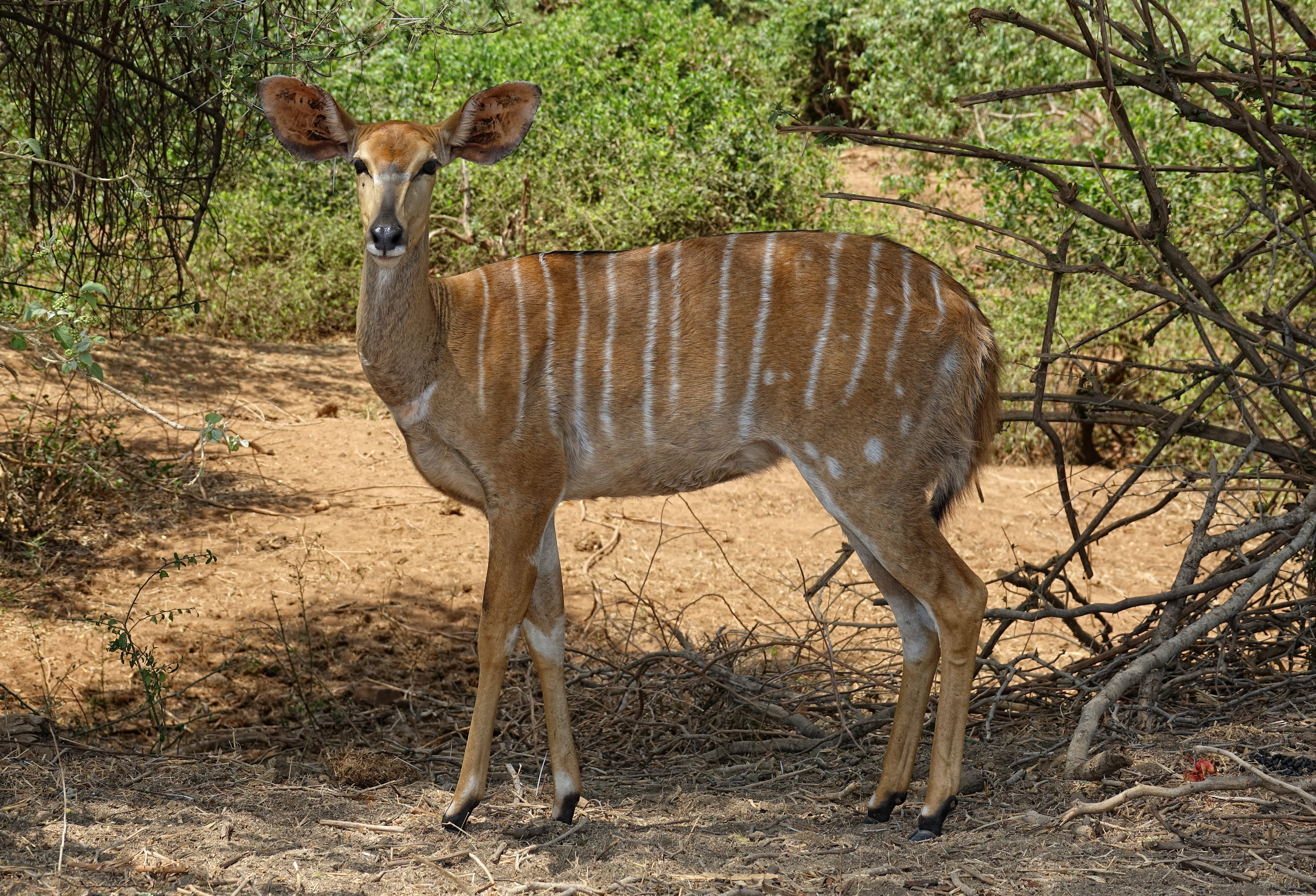
- Female in Kruger National Park, South Africa

Conservation status
- Least Concern (IUCN 3.1)

Scientific classification
- Kingdom: Animalia
- Phylum: Chordata
- Class: Mammalia
- Order: Artiodactyla
- Family: Bovidae
- Subfamily: Bovinae
- Genus: Tragelaphus
- Subgenus: Nyala; Heller, 1912
- Species: T. angasii

Binomial name
- Tragelaphus angasii (Angas, 1849)
- Geographic range

Synonyms
- Nyala angasii

= Nyala =

Species of antelope

The lowland nyala or simply nyala (Tragelaphus angasii) is a spiral-horned artiodactyl antelope native to Southern Africa. The species is part of the family Bovidae and the genus Tragelaphus (formerly placed in the genus Nyala, now regarded as a subgenus). It was first described in 1849 by George French Angas and exhibits the highest sexual dimorphism among the spiral-horned antelopes. It is not to be confused with the endangered mountain nyala living in the Bale region of Ethiopia.

The nyala's range encompasses much of Southern Africa. As its population is relatively stable, it has been listed as of least concern by the International Union for Conservation of Nature. It generally browses during the day in warm weather and during the night in the rainy season. As a herbivore, the nyala feeds upon foliage, fruits and grasses, and requires sufficient fresh water. A shy animal, it prefers water holes rather than open spaces. The nyala does not show signs of territoriality, and individuals' areas can overlap. They are very cautious creatures.

They live in single-sex or mixed family groups of up to ten individuals, but old males live alone. They inhabit thickets within dense and dry savanna woodlands. The principal threats to the species are illegal poaching and habitat loss resulting from human settlement and livestock grazing. However, the large-horned, impressive males are highly prized as game animals by sport hunters.

== Taxonomy and naming ==
- - - - - - - Taurotragus
              - Giant eland
              - Common eland
            - - Strepsiceros
                Greater kudu
              - Tragelaphus
                - Mountain nyala
                - - - - Bongo
                      - Sitatunga
                    - - - - Cape bushbuck
                          - Harnessed bushbuck
          - Nyala
            Lowland nyala
        - Ammelaphus
          Lesser kudu

Phylogenetic relationships of the mountain nyala from combined analysis of all molecular data (Willows-Munro et.al. 2005). Subgenera (stem labels) per MDD.

The nyala was first described by George French Angas, an English naturalist, in 1849. The scientific name of nyala is Tragelaphus angasii. The name angasii is attributed to Angas, who said that John Edward Gray had named this species after Angas' father, George Fife Angas of South Australia. According to Article 50.1.1 of the International Code of Zoological Nomenclature and International Commission on Zoological Nomenclature, though, this is insufficient to state Gray as the author. The name "nyala" is the Tsonga name for this antelope, which is likely the source of the English, along with Zulu inyala. Its first known use was in 1899. The word has a Bantu origin, similar to the Venda word dzì-nyálà (nyala buck).

The nyala is the second taxon to branch off from the tragelaphine family tree just after the lesser kudu. As the nyala line has remained separate for a considerable time (over 5 million years), some authorities have placed it in its own monotypic genus Nyala. Nyala was proposed in 1912 by American zoologist Edmund Heller, who also proposed Ammelaphus for the lesser kudu, but it was not widely recognized. It was re-erected as a valid genus in 2011 under the classification of Peter Grubb and Colin Groves, but has not been embraced by taxonomic authorities such as the Mammal Diversity Database. Among its closest extant relatives are the forest-inhabiting bongo, the Cape and harnessed bushbucks, the large common and giant elands, the greater and lesser kudus, the mountain nyala (of Ethiopia) and the swamp-dwelling sitatunga, all of which share similar characteristics, such as hornless females, vertical side-stripes and other unique white markings, and the spiraling horns and distinct "beard" or dewlap of males, often with a raised trail of fur extending down the back and underside.

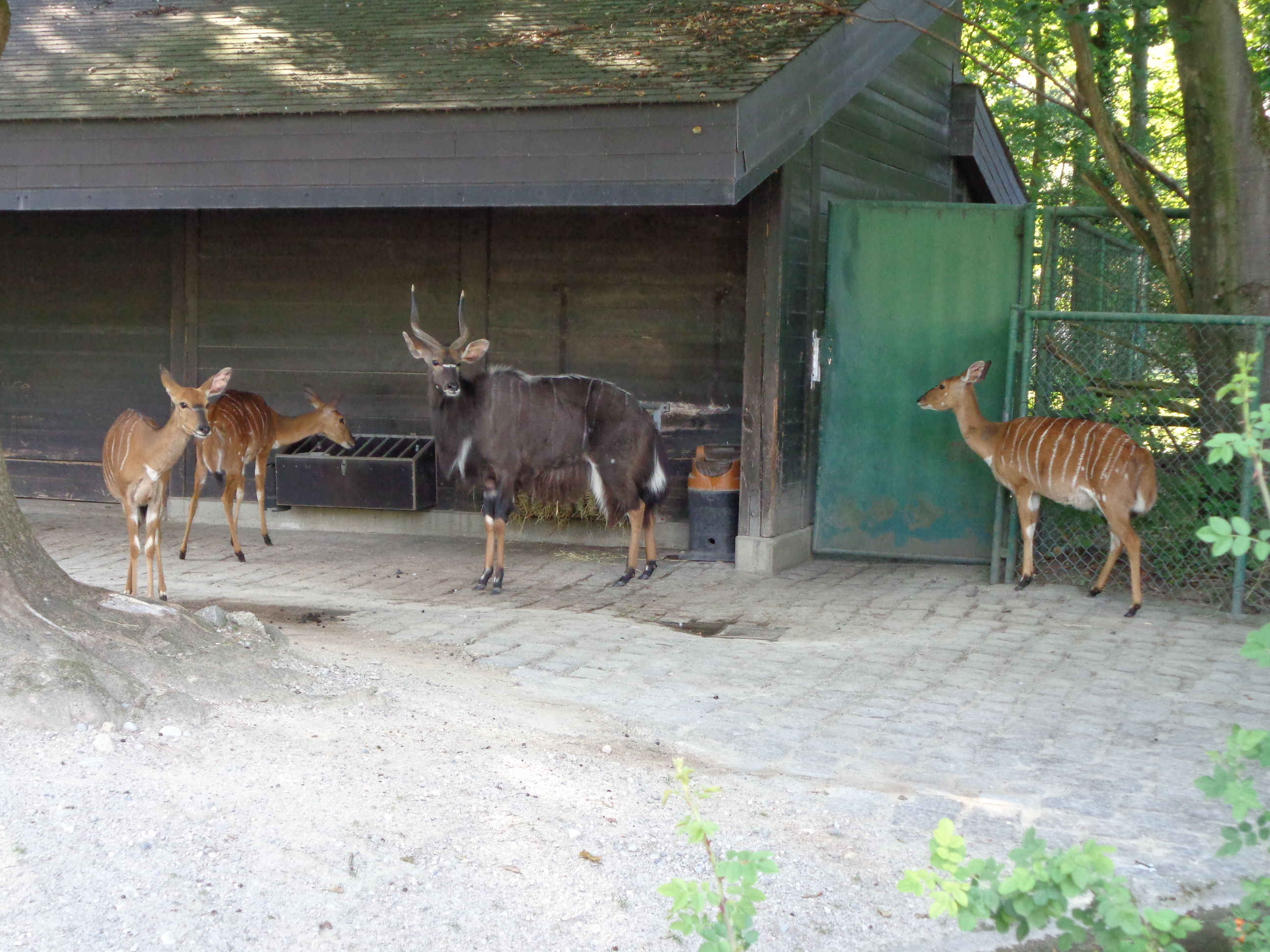
Nyala family in captivity

In 2005, Sandi Willows-Munro (of the University of KwaZulu-Natal) and colleagues carried out a mitochondrial DNA analysis of the nine Tragelaphus species. Mitochondrial DNA and nuclear DNA data were compared. The results showed the tribe Tragelaphini to be monophyletic, with the lesser kudu (T. imberbis) basal in the phylogeny, followed by the nyala. On the basis of mitochondrial data, studies have estimated that the lesser kudu separated from its sister clade around 13.7 million years ago. However, nuclear DNA data shows lesser kudu and nyala forming a clade, which collectively separated from the sister clade 13.8 million years ago.

=== Genetics and evolution ===
The nyala has 55 male chromosomes and 56 female chromosomes. The Y chromosome has been translocated onto the 14th chromosome, as in other tragelaphids, but no inversion of the Y chromosome occurs. Cranial studies have shown that the mountain nyala and nyala, though sharing a common name, are actually distant relatives.

Fossil evidence suggests that the nyala has been a separate species since the end of the Miocene (5.8 million years ago). Genetic evidence suggests that the proto-nyala had some early hybridization with the proto-lesser kudu, but the two have remained separate long after this crossing.

== Physical description ==
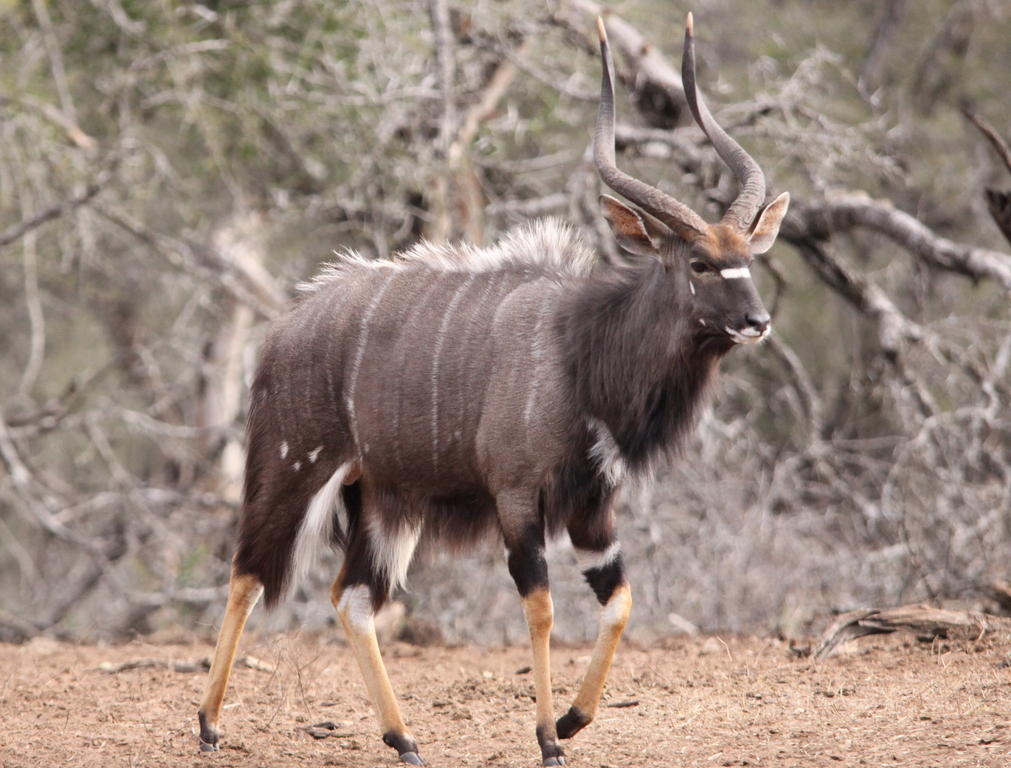
Male in the Kruger National Park

The nyala is a spiral-horned and middle-sized antelope, between a bushbuck and a kudu. It is considered the most sexually dimorphic antelope. The nyala is typically between 135–195 cm (53–77 in) in head-and-body length. The male stands up to 110 cm (43 in), the female is up to 90 cm (3.0 ft) tall. Males weigh 98–125 kg (216–276 lb), while females weigh 55–68 kg (121–150 lb). Life expectancy of the nyala is about 19 years.

The coat is rusty or rufous brown in females and juveniles. It grows a dark brown or slate grey in adult males, often with a bluish tinge. Females and young males have ten or more white vertical stripes on their sides. Other markings are visible on the face, throat, flanks and thighs. Stripes are very reduced or absent in older males. Both males and females have a white chevron between their eyes, and a 40–55 cm (16–22 in) long bushy tail white underside. Both sexes have a dorsal crest of hair running right from the back of the head to the end of the tail. Males have another line of hair along the midline of their chest and belly.

Only the males have horns. Horns are 60–83 cm (24–33 in) long and yellow-tipped. There are one or two twists. The spoor is similar to that of the bushbuck, but larger. It is 5–6 cm (2.0–2.4 in) long. The feces resemble round to spherical pellets. The nyala has hairy glands on its feet, which leave their scent wherever it walks.

The condition of the nyala often varies between the sexes. According to a study, this can be attributed to the differences in their body sizes. It was noted that during nutritional stress, old adults died in more numbers, of which most were males. During an attempt of blood sampling in the nyala, it was found that Vitamin E levels varied during stress.

== Parasites ==
A study of the helminths from 77 nyalas from four game reserves in Natal revealed the presence of ten nematode species and four nematode genera, a trematode species and paramphistomes (members of superfamily Paramphistomoidea), and two cestode genera. The research discovered new parasites that the nyala was host of - namely a Cooperia rotundispiculum race, Gaigeria pachyscelis, a Gongylonema species, Haemonchus vegliai, Impalaia tuberculata, an Oesophagostomum species, a Setaria species, Trichostrongylus deflexus, Trichostrongylus falculatus, the larval stage of a Taenia species, a Thysaniezia species and Schistosoma mattheei. Ostertagia harrisi and C. rotundispiculum were the most dominant nematodes in the antelope.

Another study of 97 blood samples of South African nyalas revealed the presence of tick-borne hemoparasites (blood parasites). The methods used were polymerase chain reaction (PCR) and reverse line blot (RLB) hybridization. The dominant parasites were Theileria species, T. buffeli, T. bicornis, Ehrlichia species, Anaplasma marginale and A. bovis. Ten tick species, two louse species and a louse fly species were recovered in a study of 73 nyalas at Umfolozi, Mkuzi and Ndumu Game Reserves in northeastern KwaZulu-Natal in 1983 and 1984 and an additional six individuals in 1994. It was found that nyalas were hosts to all stages of development in Boophilus decoloratus, Rhipicephalus appendiculatus and R. muehlensi and the immature stages of Amblyomma hebraeum and Rhipicephalus maculatus. Adult males served hosts to more ticks and lice than adult females did. Also, a trypanosome was isolated from a nyala, wild-caught in Mozambique, which was diagnosed and found as akin to Trypanosoma vivax, based on biological, morphological and molecular data.

== Diseases ==
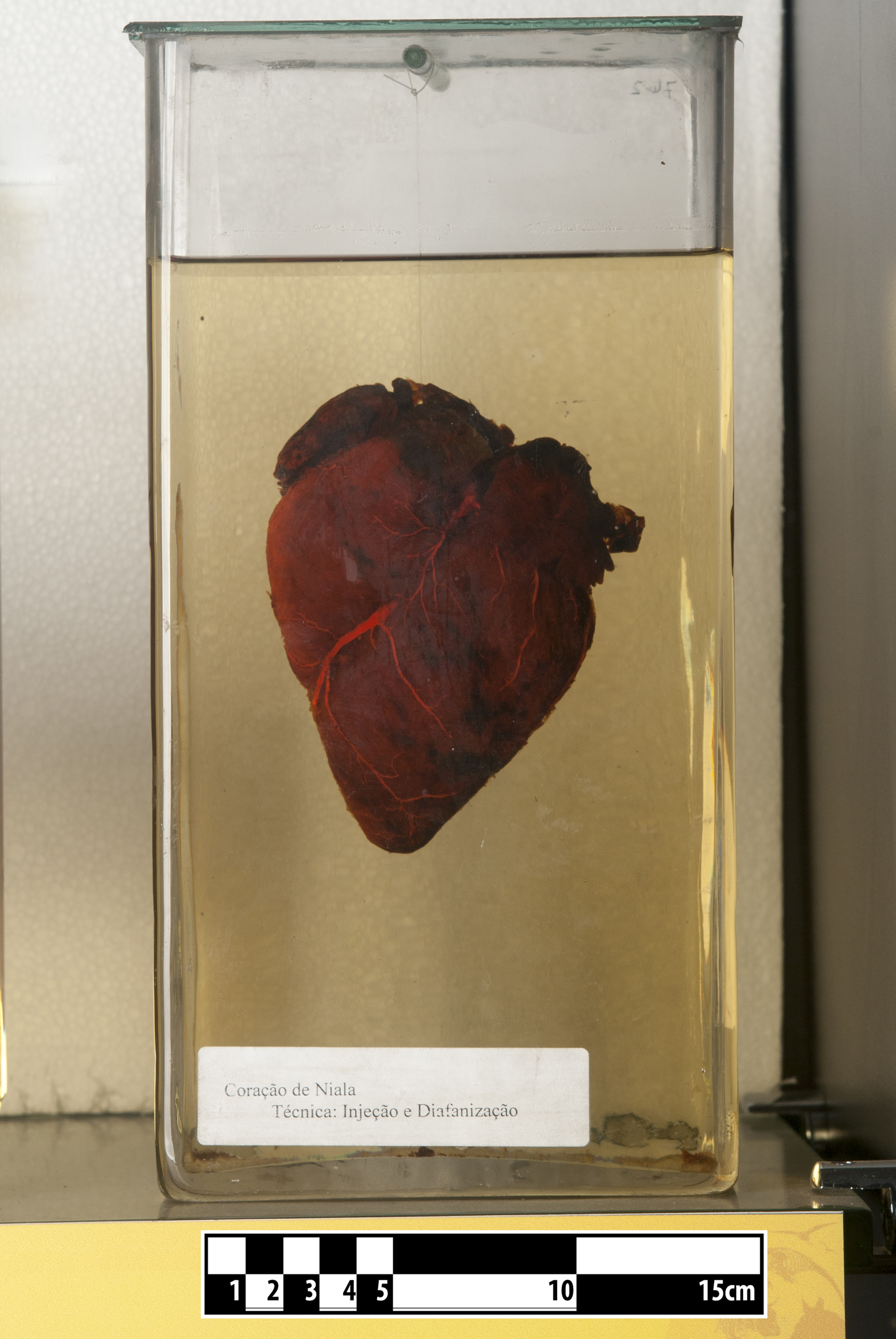
Nyala heart

The nyala can also suffer from myopathy. In between January 1973 and June 1981, 21 nyalas succumbed to the disease. The main symptoms were stiffness, inability to rise, and failure to suckle in newborns. Necrosis (that is, the premature death of cells in a living tissue) and mineralization were found in the skeletal muscle after a histological analysis. In the juveniles there was acute necrosis of the cardiac muscle. In adults, there was interstitial fibrosis of the cardiac muscle, along with arteriosclerosis.

In a report published in 1994 entitled "Epidemiological observations on spongiform encephalopathies in captive wild animals in the British Isles", it was noted that spongiform encephalopathy had been diagnosed in one nyala captive in a zoo. The nyala was formerly affected by the disease rinderpest, although the viral disease is considered eradicated now.

== Ecology and behavior ==
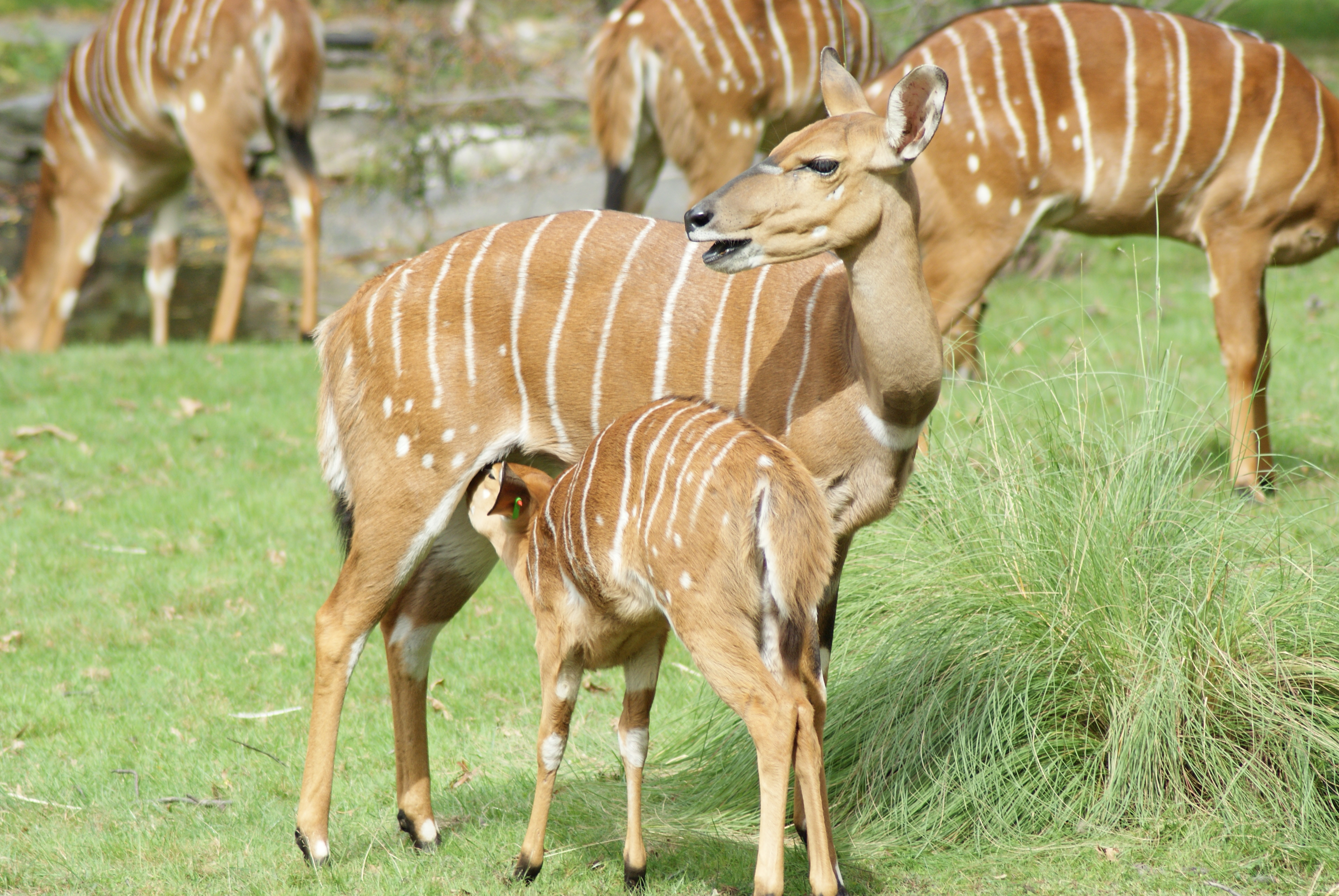
Nursing juvenile

The nyala is active mainly in the early morning and late afternoon. It browses during the day if temperatures are 20–30 °C (68–86 °F) and during the night in rainy season. These antelopes rest in thick bushes during the hot hours of the day. The nyala is very shy and cautious in nature, and often remains hidden rather than coming out in the open. Most sightings of the nyala in the wild are at water holes. But in protected areas they become less shy and often come out in view of tourists.

Nyala groups are according to sex or mixed. Herds usually browse and drink water together. Each group consists of two to ten individuals. A study in Zinave National Park at Mozambique showed that 67% of the observations were of groups of one to three nyalas, and the rest of the herds consisted of up to 30 nyalas. Herds often broke up and re-formed. Generally adult males remain alone. Females often remain near their mothers when they have their offspring, so the relationships in female herds may be closer than those of males.

Alert and wary in nature, the nyala use a sharp, high, dog-like bark to warn others in a group of danger. This feature is mainly used by females. They also react to the alarm calls of impala, baboon and kudu. The impala has been found to react to the calls of the nyala as well. The main predators of nyala are lions, servals, leopards, cheetahs, spotted hyenas, African wild dogs, Southern African rock pythons and Nile crocodiles, while chacma baboons and birds of prey, such as tawny eagles, crowned eagles, bateleurs and possibly jackal buzzards are predators of juveniles.

=== Diet ===
As a herbivore, the nyala's diet consists of foliage, fruits, flowers and twigs. During the rainy season they feed upon the fresh grass. They need a regular intake of water, and thus choose places with a water source nearby. However, they are adapted to live in areas with only a seasonal availability of water. A study in Zululand showed that the nyala fed mainly in the early morning and the late afternoon. They feed at night during the rainy season.

A study in Mkhuze Game Reserve and Ndumu Game Reserve in Natal focused on the dietary habits of the impala and the nyala showed that the amount of dicotyledons in their diets varied seasonally. In the dry season, the nyala's dicotyledon diet content was 83.2% and the impala's 52%. In this season, the diet grew richer in fiber and dietary proteins were less. The reverse occurred in the rainy season. As the rainy season arrived, both species took to a diet of mainly monocotyledons, and the impala consumed more of them. The diet contained more proteins than fiber.

Another study was done to find whether the sexual dimorphism in the nyala influenced its foraging habits. Vegetation surveys were conducted with the end of each feeding bout. It was found that females spent equal periods of time foraging in all the three habitats, but males preferred sand forest more. More differences were noted, as males ate woody species at a greater average height whereas females fed from the low herbaceous layer. It was concluded that the differences resulted from varying nutritional and energetic demands according to their diverse body sizes and differing reproductive strategies.

=== Reproduction ===
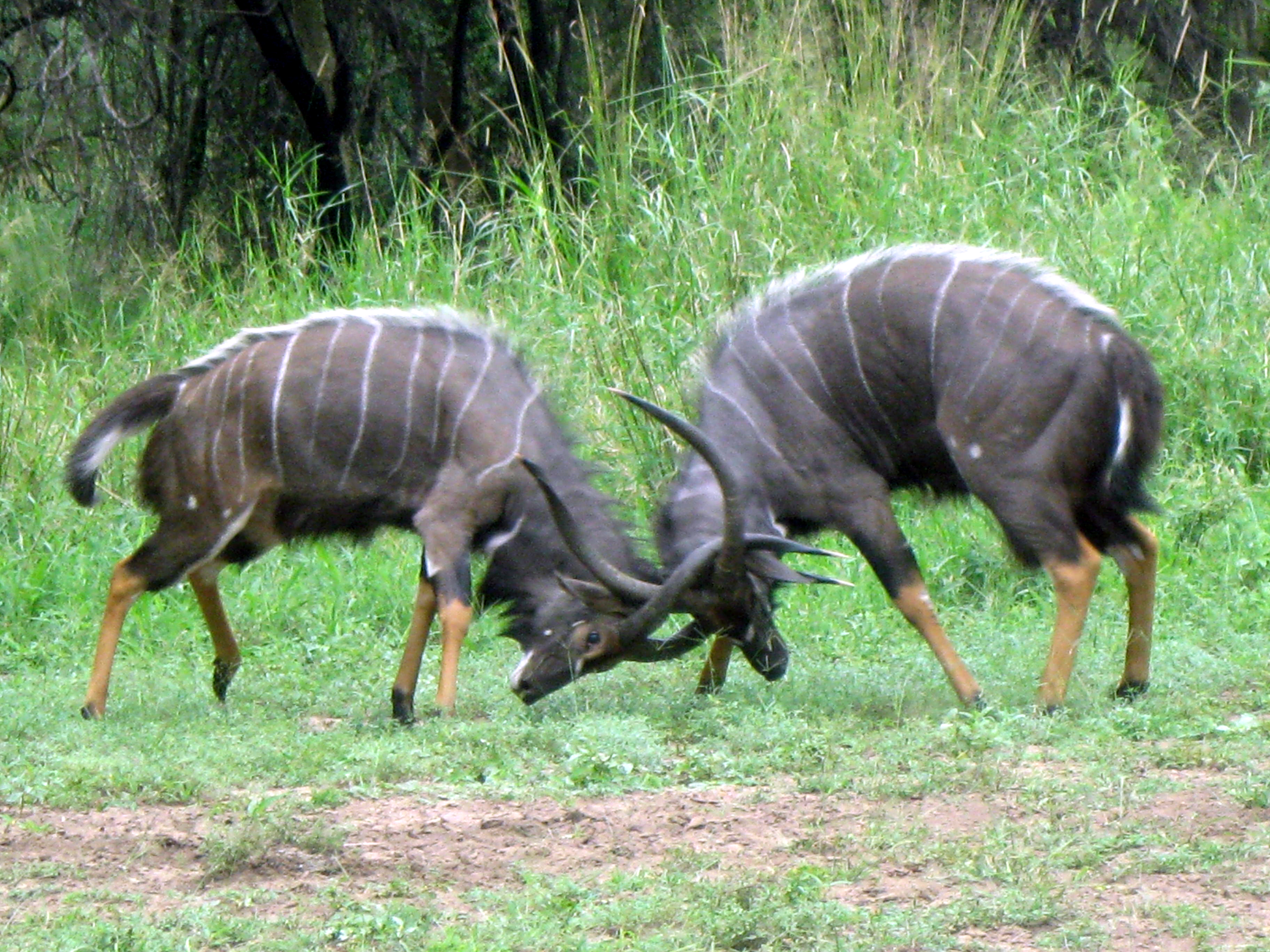
Males fighting over dominance

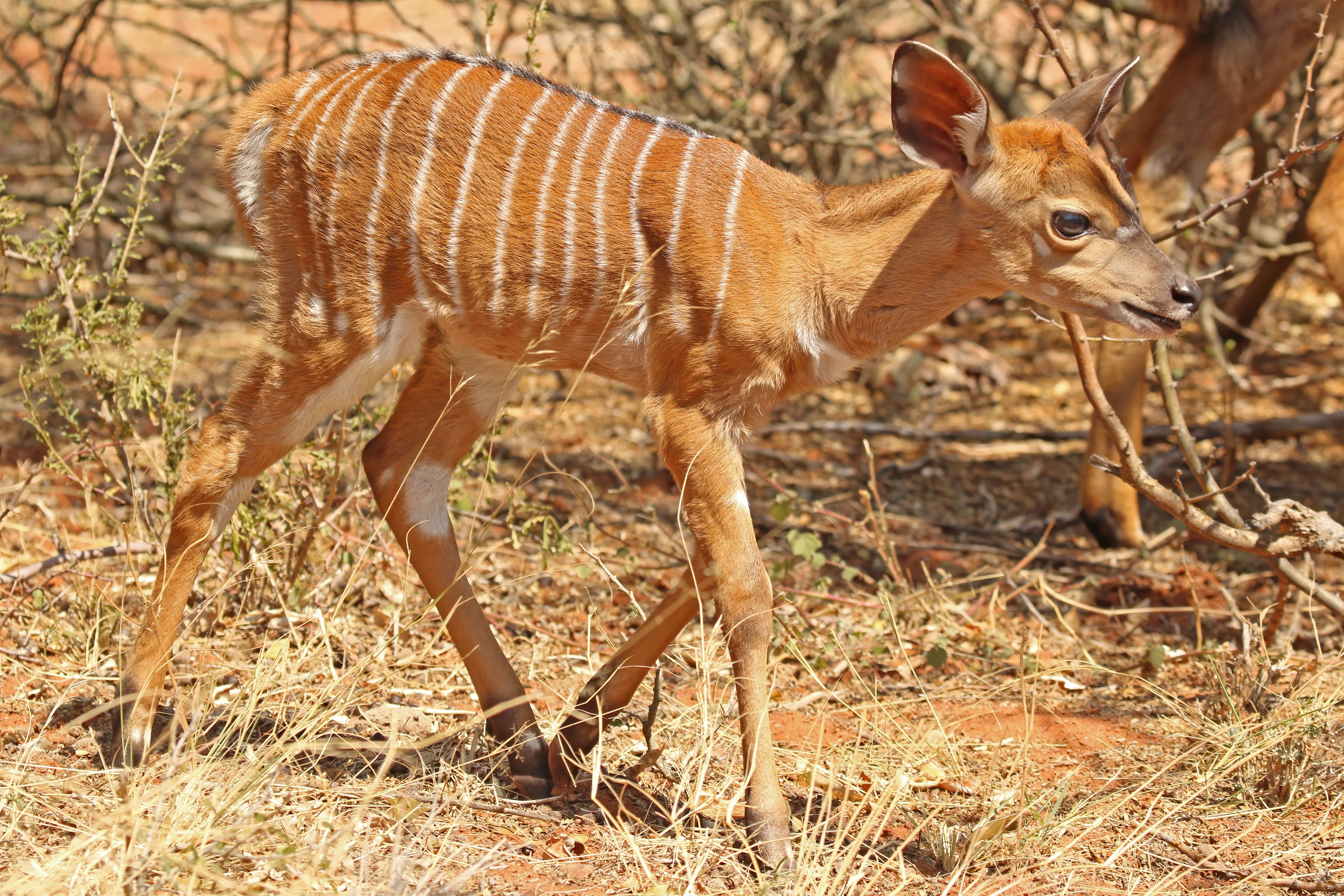
Male, two weeks old Tswalu Kalahari Reserve, South Africa

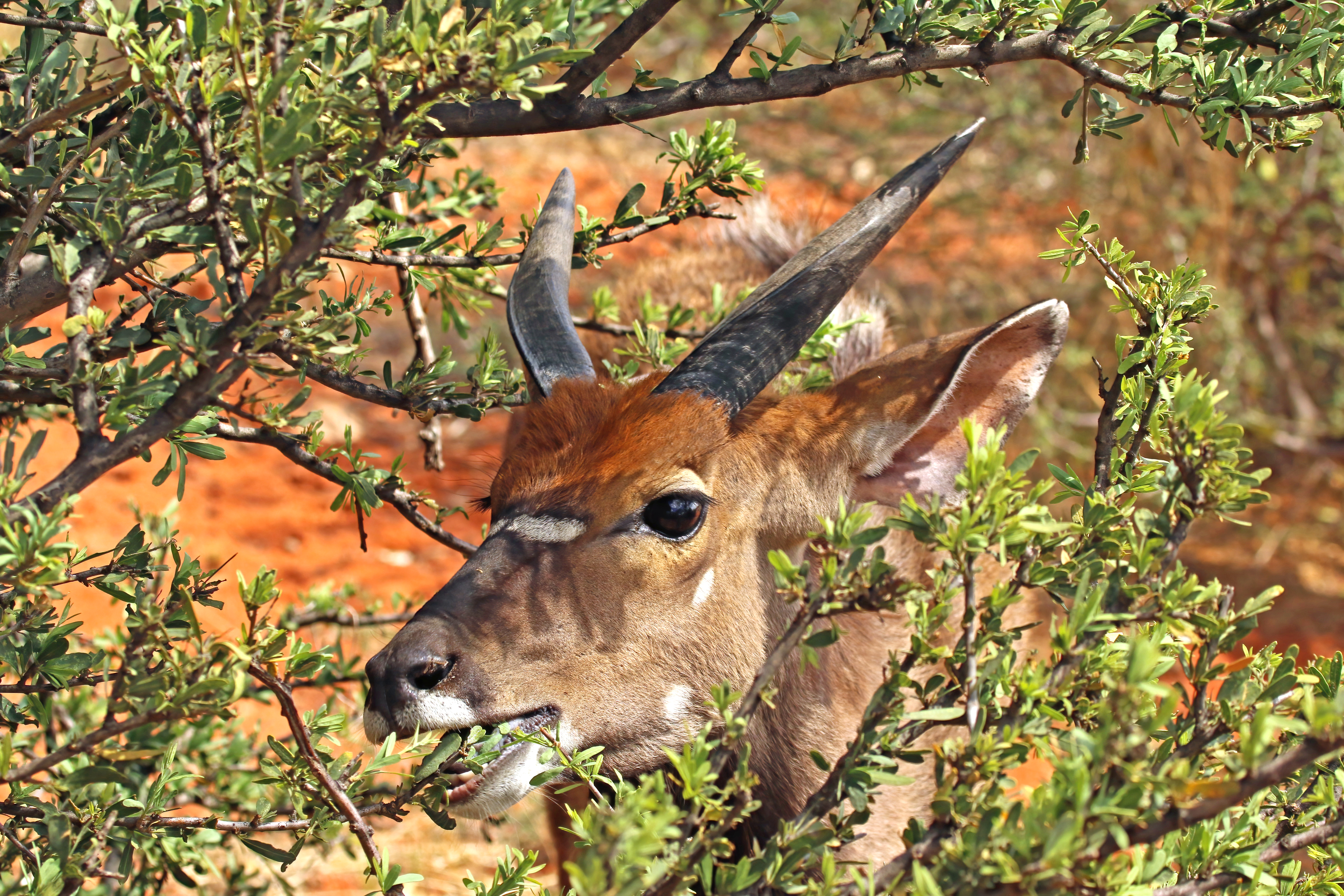
Male, two months old feeding

The nyala breeds throughout the year, but mating peaks in spring and autumn. The reason for this is still unknown, but attributed to the photoperiod and the feeding habits of the animal. Females reach sexual maturity at 11 to 12 months of age and males at 18 months (though they are socially immature until five years old), though they begin to show active spermatogenesis at 14 months.

Before ovulation, the Graafian follicles reach a length of at least 6.7 cm (2.6 in). A female's estrous cycle is about 19 days long. Males will attempt to mate with the female for two days of the cycle, but she allows it for only six hours per cycle. When the male enters a females' herd during mating, he makes a display by raising his white dorsal crest, lowering his horns and moving stiffly. As in many other animals, the males fight over dominance during mating.

The kidney fat indices (KFIs) of impalas and nyalas have been studied to understand the influence of social class and reproduction on them. To determine the KFI, the kidney is removed and weighed with the fat and once again excluding the fat. The resultant difference is the amount of fat on the kidney. The more the fat, the healthier the animal. In rut, male nyalas had lower KFIs, which did not vary much with the season. Pregnant females of both nyala and impala had higher KFIs than non-pregnant ones.

There is a significant increase in corpus luteum in the last third of gestation. Gestation is of seven months. A single calf is born, weighing 5 kg (11 lb). Birth takes place generally away from the sight of predators, in places such as a thicket. The calf remains hidden for up to 18 days, and the mother nurses it at regular intervals. The calf remains with its mother until the birth of the next calf, during which males in rut drive it away from the mother.

== Habitat and distribution ==
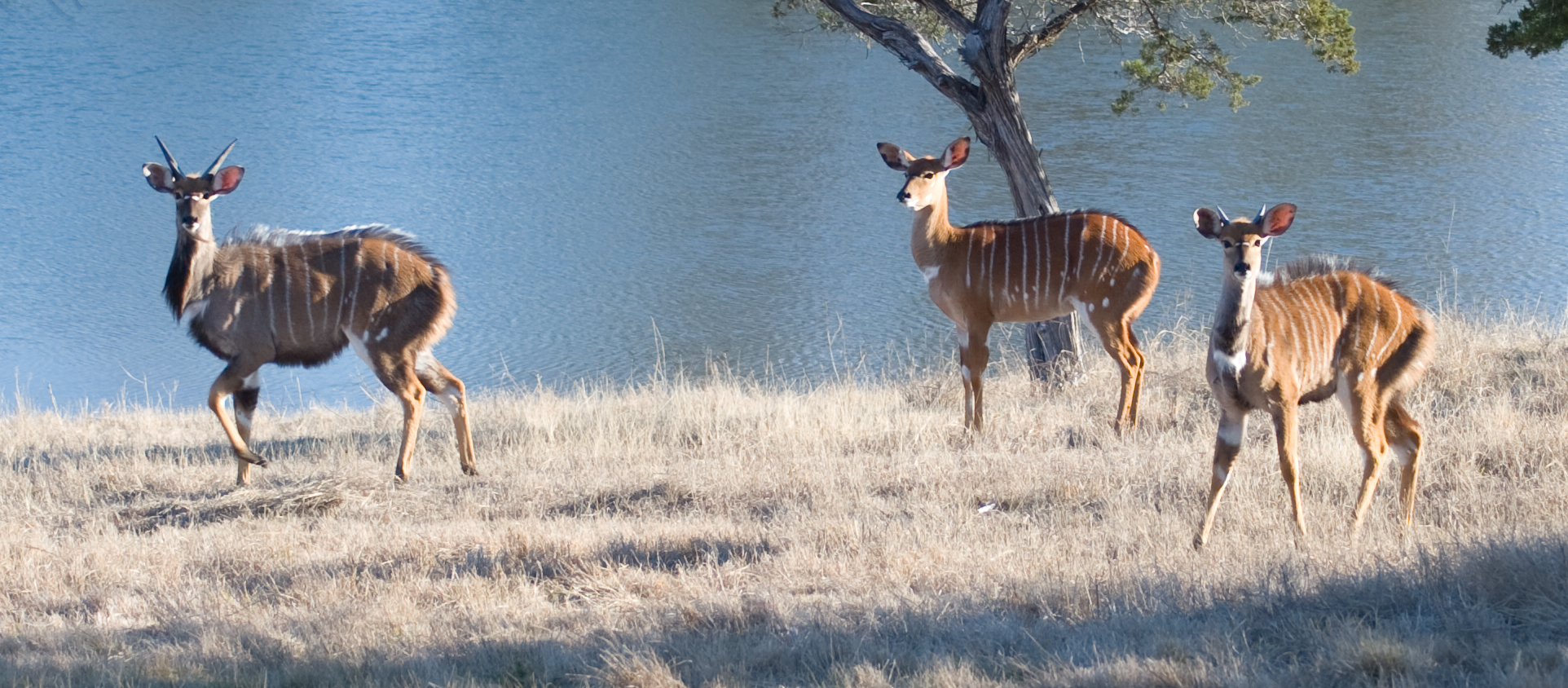
Nyalas choose habitat with fresh water sources nearby.

The nyala inhabits dense lowland woodlands and thickets, mainly in southern Malawi, Mozambique, Zimbabwe, and eastern South Africa. It chooses places with good quality grasslands as well as provision of fresh water. It also inhabits lush green river country. The nyala's natural range stretches across southeast Africa from the Lower Shire Valley in Malawi through Mozambique and Zimbabwe to eastern South Africa and Eswatini.

The geographic distribution of the nyala may be based on the genetic variation. According to a study of nyala in South Africa, Mozambique, Malawi and Zimbabwe, there was a marked difference in the gene frequencies at three microsatellite loci. Mitochondrial DNA analysis revealed the presence of a unique haplotype in individuals from each location. Thus, the geographic variation in the nyala may be due to a distribution pattern based on habitat specificity.

Today nyala are found in South African protected areas in the Ndumo Game Reserve, uMkuze Game Reserve and Hluhluwe–Umfolozi Game Reserve, all in KwaZulu-Natal, as well as in Kruger National Park. As of 1999, 10–15% of nyala occurred on private land. Efforts are being made to retain the populations of nyala in Gorongosa National Park and Banhine National Park in Mozambique. Nyala also thrive in Lengwe National Park in Malawi.

Nyala have never been observed showing territoriality. Territories of either sex overlap extensively. The home ranges of males are approximately equal to that of females, about 10 square kilometres (3.9 sq mi) in area.

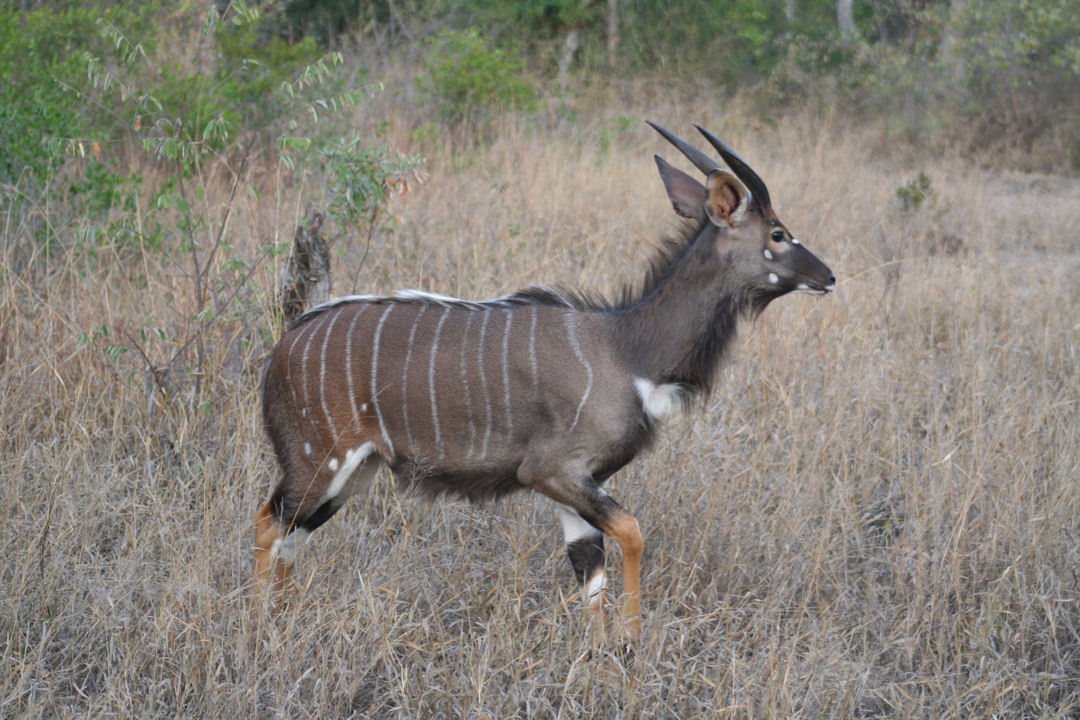
Young nyala bull in the Kruger National Park

== Threats and conservation ==
The major threats to the population of the nyala are poaching, habitat loss, agriculture and cattle grazing. Rinderpest outbreaks have also contributed in population loss. This species is currently of Least Concern, and the population is considered stable by both the IUCN and CITES. As of 1999, the total population of the nyala was around 32,000 individuals. More recent estimates show that South Africa has at least 30,000 nyalas, with 25,000 in KwaZulu-Natal. There are now more than 1,000 on protected areas and ranches in Eswatini. In Mozambique there are not more than 3,000, in Zimbabwe over 1,000, and numbers in Malawi have fallen from 3,000 to about 1,500. Namibia has the smallest population, at about 250.

Today over 80% of the total population is protected in national parks and sanctuaries, mostly in South African protected areas. In South Africa there is a high demand for adult males as game trophies.
