= Daju languages =

Group of Eastern Sudanic languages

Daju
- Dagu
- Geographic distribution: Sudan, Chad, South Sudan
- Ethnicity: Daju people
- Linguistic classification: Nilo-Saharan?: Eastern Sudanic?; Southern Eastern?; Daju
- Proto-language: Proto-Daju
- Subdivisions: Eastern Daju; Western Daju

Language codes
- Glottolog: daju1249
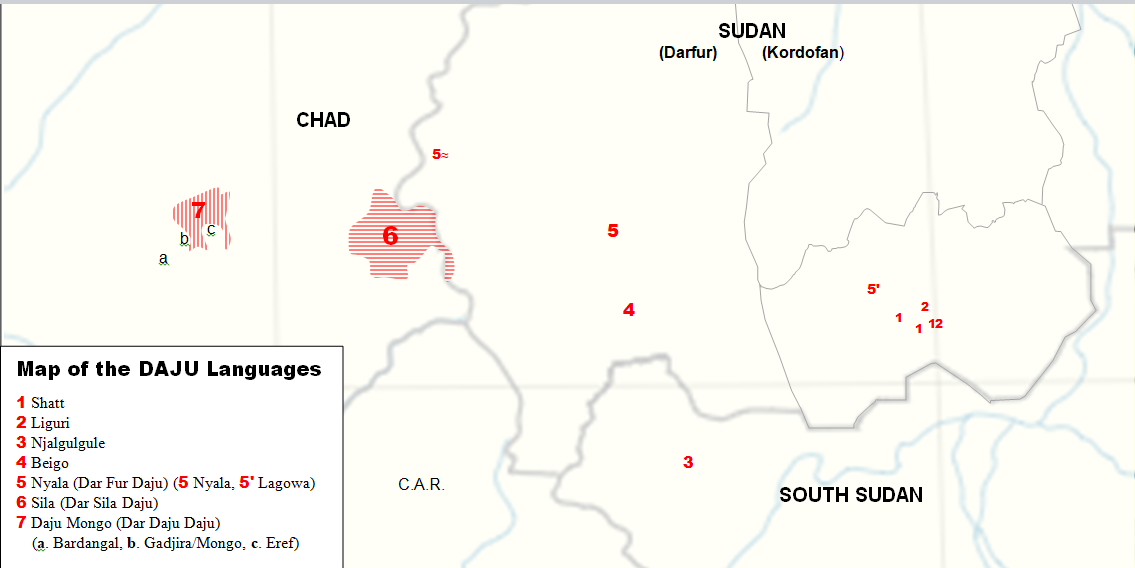

The Daju languages are spoken in isolated pockets by the Daju people across a wide area of Sudan and Chad. In Sudan, they are spoken in parts of the regions of Kordofan and Darfur, in Chad they are spoken in Wadai. The Daju languages belong to the Eastern Sudanic subfamily of Nilo-Saharan.

== Languages ==
The Daju languages are sub-classified as follows, following Stevenson (1956).

- Daju
  - Eastern
    - Shatt in the Shatt Hills southwest of Kadugli. (The name "Shatt" is also applied to other unrelated languages of the area.)
    - Liguri (also known as Subori) in the Nuba Hills, Sudan
  - Western
    - Daju Mongo in Dar Daju, Chad
    - Sila in Dar Sila, Chad
    - Nyala around Nyala in Darfur, Sudan
    - Beigo (extinct) in southern Darfur
    - Njalgulgule in South Sudan on the Sopo River

Proto-Daju has been partially reconstructed by Robin Thelwall (1981). In his judgement, the Eastern Daju languages separated from the others perhaps as much as 2,000 years ago, while the Western Daju languages were spread more recently, perhaps by the Daju state which dominated Darfur from about 1200 AD until scattered after the death of Kasi Furogé, the Daju king, and replaced by the Tunjur. The principal phonetic difference between the two branches is the reflex of proto-Daju *ɣ, reflected as Western *r and Eastern *x.

== Grammar ==
The typical verb root in Daju is a monosyllable of the form (C)VC(C). The perfective takes a prefixed k-; the imperfective, a prefixed a(n)-. The verb takes person suffixes, exemplified in Shatt (for the verb "drink" in the imperfective):

	singular	plural
1st person	a-wux-u I drink	(w)a-wux-u-d-ök we drink
2nd person	wux-u you drink	wux-a-d-aŋ you (pl.) drink
3rd person	mö-wux-u s/he drinks	sö-wux-u they drink

Suffixes on nouns serve to mark singulative (-tic, -təs), generic, and plural forms. The typical word order is subject–verb–object in most Daju languages, with exceptions such as Sila, and possessed–possessor.

== See also ==
- List of Proto-Daju reconstructions (Wiktionary)
