= Nyolge language =

Daju language spoken in South Sudan

Nyolge
- Njalgulgule
- Native to: South Sudan
- Region: Sopo River
- Ethnicity: Ngulgule
- Native speakers: (900 cited 1977)
- Language family: Nilo-Saharan?: Eastern Sudanic; Southern Eastern?; Daju; Western; Nyolge

Language codes
- ISO 639-3: njl
- Glottolog: njal1239
- ELP: Njalgulgule

Nyolge or Nyagulgule (Njalgulgule) is a Daju language of the Western Daju, spoken in a single village in South Sudan.
