= Anaplasma platys =

Scientific classification
- Domain: Bacteria
- Kingdom: Pseudomonadati
- Phylum: Pseudomonadota
- Class: Alphaproteobacteria
- Subclass: "Rickettsidae"
- Order: Rickettsiales
- Family: Ehrlichiaceae
- Genus: Anaplasma
- Species: A. platys

Binomial name
- Anaplasma platys Dumler et al., 2001

Species of bacterium

Anaplasma platys (formerly Ehrlichia platys) is a species of gram-negative bacteria. This species is responsible for anaplasmosis in dogs. A. platys was initially believed to be transmitted by Rhipicephalus sanguineus; however, in vitro studies indicate that this tick species may not act as vectors for this species of bacteria.
