= Beigo language =

Extinct Daju language of Sudan

Beigo
- Native to: Sudan
- Region: Darfur
- Ethnicity: 850 Baygo (1978)
- Extinct: 1960s
- Language family: Nilo-Saharan?: Eastern Sudanic?; Southern Eastern?; Daju; Western; Beigo

Language codes
- ISO 639-3: byg
- Glottolog: bayg1239
- ELP: Baygo

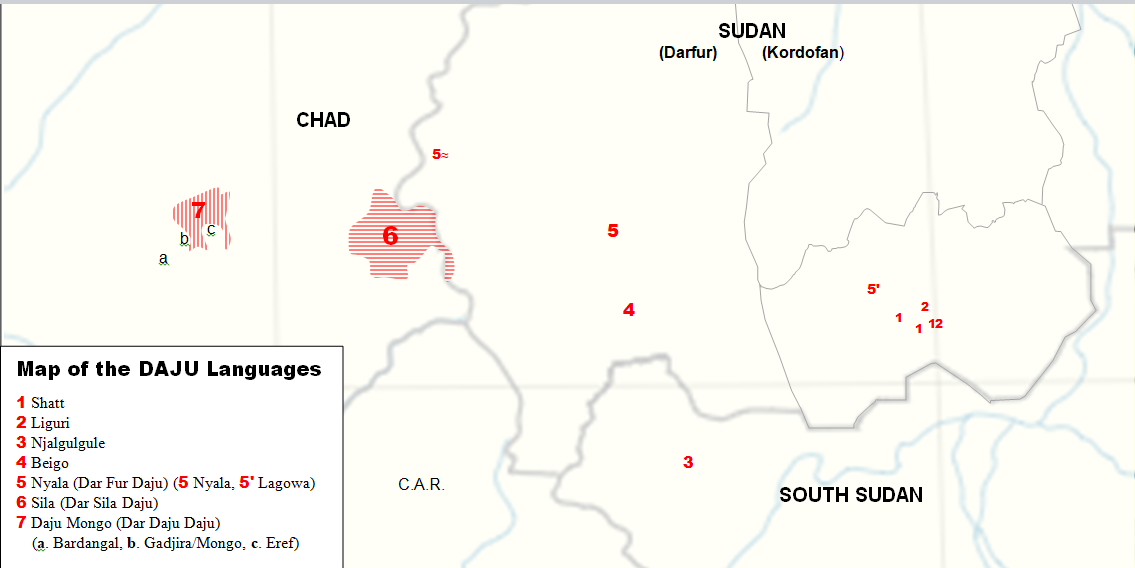
Map showing the extent of the Daju-speaking groups.

Beigo (Baygo, Baigo, Bego, Beko, Béogé, Beygo) is an extinct Daju language once spoken in Sudan by the Baygo people, numbering some 850 in the late twentieth century. Similar to Darfur Daju, it is classified as part of the Western Daju family of languages.

== Bibliography ==
- Inventaire des etudes linguistiques sur les pays d'Afrique noire d'expression francaise et sur Madagascar, Daniel Barreteau 1978 ISBN 978-2-85319-052-7
- Sudan notes and records, Volume 21, The Sudan Philosophical Society
- A Thesaurus of African Languages: A Classified and Annotated Inventory of the Spoken Languages of Africa: with an Appendix on Their Written Representation, Mann and Danby, January 1987, Hans Zell Publishers, ISBN 978-0-905450-24-7
