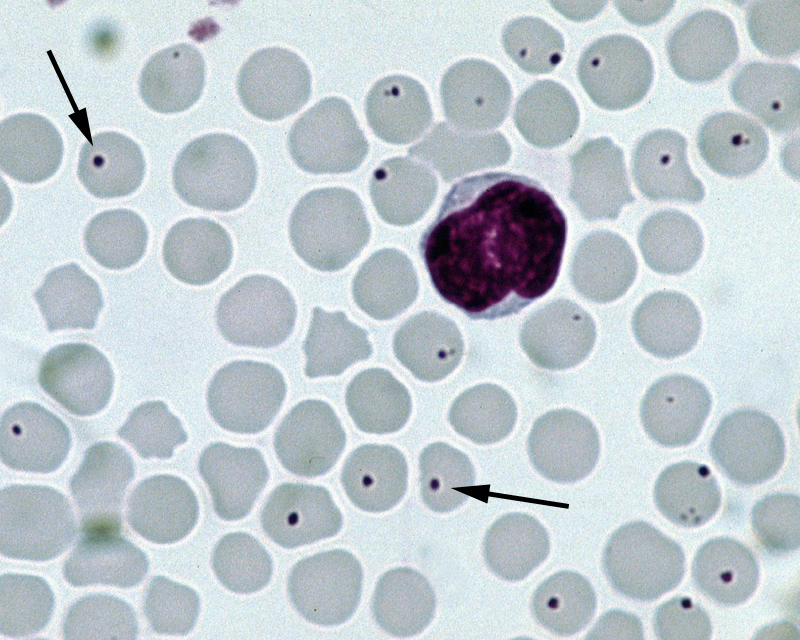
- Anaplasma centrale in Giemsa-stained cattle peripheral blood smear

Scientific classification
- Domain: Bacteria
- Kingdom: Pseudomonadati
- Phylum: Pseudomonadota
- Class: Alphaproteobacteria
- Order: Rickettsiales
- Family: Ehrlichiaceae
- Genus: Anaplasma; Theiler 1910

Type species
- Anaplasma marginale

Species
- A. bovis "Candidatus A. sparouinense" A. caudatum A. centrale A. marginale A. ovis A. phagocytophilum A. platys

= Anaplasma =

Genus of bacteria

Anaplasma is a genus of gram-negative bacteria of the alphaproteobacterial order Rickettsiales, family Anaplasmataceae.

Anaplasma species reside in host blood cells and lead to the disease anaplasmosis. The disease most commonly occurs in areas where competent tick vectors are indigenous, including tropical and semitropical areas of the world for intraerythrocytic Anaplasma spp.

Anaplasma species are biologically transmitted by Ixodes deer-tick vectors, and the prototypical species, A. marginale, can be mechanically transmitted by biting flies and iatrogenically with blood-contaminated instruments. One of the major consequences of infection of bovine red blood cells by A. marginale is the development of nonhaemolytic anaemia, thus the absence of hemoglobinuria, which allows clinical differentiation from another major tick-borne disease, bovine babesiosis, caused by Babesia bigemina.

Species of veterinary interest include:

- Anaplasma marginale and Anaplasma centrale in cattle
- Anaplasma ovis and Anaplasma mesaeterum in sheep and goats
- Anaplasma phagocytophilum in dogs, cats, and horses (see human granulocytic anaplasmosis)
- Anaplasma platys in dogs

The Anaplasma sparouinense species is responsible for a rare zoonosis, the Sparouine anaplasmosis, detected only in French Guiana, South America. This disease was described by a clandestine gold miner working deep in the rainforest. Infection of his red blood cells led to a severe deterioration of his health and required his hospitalization. Molecular typing showed that Anaplasma sparouinense is distinct to all known species and more genetically related to recently described Anaplasma species causing infections in rainforest wild fauna of Brazil.

== Genomes ==
The genomes from at least three different Anaplasma species have been sequenced. These genomes are about 1.1 to 1.2 MB in size and encode 925 to 1,335 proteins.
