= Daju Mongo language =

Daju language of Chad

Daju Dar Daju
- Daju Mongo
- Native to: Chad
- Region: Batha (Mongo)
- Native speakers: 60,000 (2020)
- Language family: Nilo-Saharan?: Eastern Sudanic; Southern Eastern?; Daju; Western; Daju Dar Daju
- Dialects: Bardangal; Eref; Gadjira
- Writing system: Latin

Language codes
- ISO 639-3: djc
- Glottolog: dard1243

Daju Mongo, also Wadai Daju or Dar Daju Daju, is an Eastern Sudanic language, one of three closely related languages in the area called "Daju" (the other two being the Nyala language and the Sila language). It is spoken in Chad by the Dar Daju Daju people near the Darfur border. There are three dialects, Bardangal, Eref, and Gadjira.

== Phonology ==
=== Consonants ===
		Labial	Alveolar	Palatal	Velar/ Glottal
Plosive	voiceless	p	t	c	k
Plosive	voiced	b	d	ɟ	ɡ
Plosive	prenasal	ᵐb	ⁿd	ᶮɟ	ᵑɡ
Plosive	implosive	ɓ	ɗ	ʄ	
Fricative	voiceless		s		(h)
Fricative	voiced		(z)		
Nasal		m	n	ɲ	ŋ
Tap			ɾ		
Approximant		w	l	j	

- Sounds /z h/ are only heard among Arabic loanwords.
- /s/ can be heard as [ʃ] when in the environment of palatal consonants, or before front vowels.

=== Vowels ===
	Front	Central	Back
Close	i iː		u uː
Mid	e eː		o oː
Open		a aː	

- Sounds /e, o/ can be heard as [ɛ, ɔ] when in closed syllables.
