= Imidocarb =

Names
- Preferred IUPAC name N,N′-Bis[3-(4,5-dihydro-1H-imidazol-2-yl)phenyl]urea
- Other names Imizocarb; Imizol; Diamidine

Identifiers
CAS Number	27885-92-3
3D model (JSmol)	Interactive image
ChemSpider	20102
ECHA InfoCard	100.044.268
PubChem CID	21389
UNII	8USS3K0VDH
CompTox Dashboard (EPA)	DTXSID0048345
- InChI: InChI=1S/C19H20N6O/c26-19(24-15-5-1-3-13(11-15)17-20-7-8-21-17)25-16-6-2-4-14(12-16)18-22-9-10-23-18/h1-6,11-12H,7-10H2,(H,20,21)(H,22,23)(H2,24,25,26) Key: SCEVFJUWLLRELN-UHFFFAOYSA-N; InChI=1/C19H20N6O/c26-19(24-15-5-1-3-13(11-15)17-20-7-8-21-17)25-16-6-2-4-14(12-16)18-22-9-10-23-18/h1-6,11-12H,7-10H2,(H,20,21)(H,22,23)(H2,24,25,26) Key: SCEVFJUWLLRELN-UHFFFAOYAD
- SMILES: O=C(Nc2cc(C/1=N/CCN\1)ccc2)Nc3cccc(c3)/C4=N/CCN4

Properties
Chemical formula	C_{19}H_{20}N_{6}O
Molar mass	348.410 g·mol^{−1}

Pharmacology
ATCvet code	QP51EX01 (WHO)
- Except where otherwise noted, data are given for materials in their standard state (at 25 °C [77 °F], 100 kPa). Infobox references

Imidocarb is a urea derivative used in veterinary medicine as an antiprotozoal agent for the treatment of infection with Babesia (babesiosis) and other parasites.

== Mechanism of action ==
Imidocarb is anticholinergic; it inhibits acetylcholinesterase.
