= Shatt language =

Eastern Sudanic language of Suda

Shatt
- Ikä Caning
- Native to: Sudan
- Region: South Kordofan
- Ethnicity: Shatt
- Native speakers: 30,000 (2014)
- Language family: Nilo-Saharan?: Eastern Sudanic; Southern Eastern?; Daju; Eastern; Shatt
- Writing system: Latin

Language codes
- ISO 639-3: shj
- Glottolog: shat1244
- ELP: Shatt
- Linguasphere: 05-PEA-aa
- Shatt is classified as Severely Endangered by the UNESCO Atlas of the World's Languages in Danger.

The Shatt language is a Daju language of the Eastern Daju family spoken by the Shatt people in the Shatt Hills (part of the Nuba Mountains) southwest of Kaduqli in South Kordofan province in southern Sudan.

Villages are Shatt Daman, Shatt Safia, and Shatt Tebeldia (Ethnologue, 22nd edition).

== Names ==
The designation "Shatt" is an Arabic word meaning "dispersed" and is applied to several distinct groups in the Nuba Mountains. "Caning" is their own name for themselves, linguistically referred to as endonym, whereas "Shatt" is considered an exonym due to its external ascription. Speakers refer to their language as ikä caning ('mouth, language').

== Phonology ==
=== Consonants ===
		Labial	Alveolar	Palatal	Velar	Glottal
Nasal		m	n	ɲ	ŋ	
Plosive	voiceless	p	t	c	k	(ʔ)
Plosive	voiced	b	d	ɟ	g	
Plosive	implosive	ɓ	ɗ	ʄ		
Fricative	voiceless	f	s		x	h
Fricative	voiced		z			
Rhotic			r			
Approximant		w	l	j		

- /x/ may vary between velar [x] or uvular [χ] fricative sounds.
- A glottal stop [ʔ] may also occur, only in intervocalic positions.

=== Vowels ===
	Front	Central	Back
Close	i		u
Mid	e	ə	o
Open		a	

- /ə/ is phonetically raised as [ə̝].
- Sounds /e, o/ may also be heard as [ɛ, ɔ].

== Alphabet ==
The alphabet consists of 27 letters, which are shown in the table below with the corresponding letter from the International Phonetic Alphabet chart.

IPA	[a]	[ə̝]	[ɓ]	[c]	[d]	[ɗ]	[ɛ]	[f]	[g]	[i]	[ʄ]	[k]	[l]	[m]	[n]	[ŋ]	[ɲ]	[ɔ]	[p]	[r]	[s]	[t]	[u]	[w]	[x]	[j]	[z]
Upper Case	A	Ä	B	C	D	ꞌD	E	F	G	I	J	K	L	M	N	Ng	Ny	O	P	R	S	T	U	W	X	Y	Z
Lower Case	a	ä	b	c	d	ꞌd	e	f	g	i	j	k	l	m	n	ng	ny	o	p	r	s	t	u	w	x	y	z

== Grammar ==
The grammar in this section is primarily based on the Caning Grammar Book (Second Edition 2017).

=== Types of Words ===
Types of Caning Words
Type	Example	Translation
Noun	Kig kasiy ya.	Person ate meat.
Verb	Kig kasiy ya.	Person ate meat.
Preposition	Kig kasiy ya tä pumpung.	Person ate meat in bush.
Location	Kig kasiy ya tagä pa.	Person ate meat in front of house.
Pronoun	Ma masiy ya.	He ate meat.
Adjective	Kig kasiy yana apo.	Person ate good meat.
Quantity	Kig kasiy ya käꞌday.	Person ate all the meat.
Number	Kig kasiy aska kodos.	Person ate three fishes.
Adverb	Kig kasiy ya tetex.	Person ate meat quickly.
Question Word	Xänang kasiy ya?	Who ate meat?
Connector	Ndä kig kasiy ya.	Then person ate meat.

=== Nouns ===
A noun in Caning "can be a person, animal, place, thing, or idea."

==== Singular and Plural ====
Plurals in Caning are built in three different ways:

1. By adding a suffix to the singular.
2. By adding a suffix to the plural.
3. By adding a suffix to both, the singular and the plural form.

Suffixes: Singular and Plural
Suffix S/P	Root	Singular	Plural	Translation
-ic / -	ux	uxic	ux	worm(s)
/ -iny	ax	ax	axiny	hut(s)
-ic / -iny	win-	winic	wininy	vulture(s)

When adding a singular suffix only as described in form one, the plural form remains unchanged.

Most common Singular Suffixes
Suffix	Singular	Plural	Translation
-c /	bebec	bebe	gourd
-dic, -tic/	gäldic	gäl	egg
-wec /	ngaluwec	ngalu	bell
-wic /	kadasuwic	kadasu	foundation

For the second for, when adding the plural suffix only, the singular form remains unchanged.

Some common Plural Suffxes
Suffix	Singular	Plural	Translation
/ -u	ux	uxu	women
/ -da, -ta	oxay	oxayda	animals
/ -di, -ti	bul	buldi	drums
/ -de, -te	jen	jende	years

Certain patterns occur in pairs for the respective singular and plural forms, as described in form three.

Suffix pairs
Pair	Singular	Plural	Translation
-ic / -iny	winic	wininy	vulture(s)
-ic / -u	banyic	banyu	light(s)
-wan/-wan	penäwan	penggäwan	son(s)
-x/-ny	osox	osony	lion(s)
-d/ -nu	'dawud	'dawunu	type of fish

===== Plural-only nouns =====
There are exceptions to the rule, e.g. words that change form, having a shorter plural than singular form or no singular or plural form at all.

Some nouns only occur as plurals, e.g. noncountable nouns that refer to masses or liquids:

Example: Plural-only nouns
Singular		Plural	
/	/	mem/mmem	milk
/	/	Ma/mma	water
/	/	zäg/zik	earth, ground

=== Pronouns ===
Subject and Object Pronouns
	Singular		Plural	
1st Person	agä	I	Was	We (not you)
1st Person	agä	I	Kog	We (and you)
2nd Person	gi	You	Anggo	You
3rd Person	ma	He	Sa	They
3rd Person	ce	She	Sa	They
3rd Person	nya	It	Sa	They

It is noteworthy that Caning has two forms of the pronoun "we" (1st person plural) that could be distinguished by calling them inclusive and exclusive versions. One being -was (we - not you) and the other one being -kog (we - and you).

This difference is also made with the possessor and possessive pronouns us/our(s).

==== Possessor Pronouns ====
Possessor pronouns can replace the possessor (apang = man) in the sentence below.

"Kig kasax axä apang. Person refused hut of man.

Kig kasax axang. Person refused my hut." (ax = hut)

Possessor Pronouns
Possessor	Caning	Singular	Plural	Translation
my	-ang	axang	axinygang	my hut
your (sg)	-ägi	axägi	axinygägi	your (sg) hut
his	-äma	axäma	axinygäma	his hut
her	-äce	axäce	axinygäce	her hut
its	-änya	axgänya	axinygänya	its hut
our (not your)	-äsko	axäsko	axinygäsko	our (not your) hut
our (and your)	-og	axog	axinygog	our (and your) hut
your (pl)	-ägo	axägo	axinygägo	your (pl) hut
their	-äsa	axäsa	axinygäsa	their hut

==== Possessive Pronouns ====
Possessive Pronouns can also replace nouns.

By using the same example, the difference between possessor and possessive pronouns become more clear.

"Kig kasax axä apang. Person refused hut of man.

Kig kasax nämanggo. Person refused his." (ax = hut)

All of the possessive pronouns below can therefore take the place of nämanggo in the above sentence.

Possessive Pronouns
Caning	Pronoun
nanggä	mine
nänggi	yours (sg)
nämanggo	his
näcengga	hers
nänyanggo	its
näskonga	ours (us, not you)
nänokanga	ours (us and you)
nänggonga	yours (pl)
näsanga	theirs

=== Numbers ===
==== Cardinal numbers ====
Cardinal numbers in Caning
N	Text in Caning	N	Text in Caning	N	Text in Caning	N	Text in Caning
1	nuxu	11	asiny wang nuxu	21	ud wang nuxu	110	udiny mädäg wang asiny
2	pädax	12	asiny wang pädax	30	ud wang asiny	200	udiny mädäginy pädax
3	kodos	13	asiny wang kodos	31	ud wang asiny wang nuxu	300	udiny mädäginy kudos
4	tesped	14	asiny wang tesped	40	udiny pädax	400	udiny mädäginy tesped
5	mädäg	15	asiny wang mädäg	50	udiny pädax wang asiny	500	udiny mädäginy mädäg
6	aran	16	asiny wang aran	60	udiny kodos	600	udiny mädäginy aran
7	paxtänding	17	asiny wang paxtänding	70	udiny kudos wang asiny	700	udiny mädäginy paxtänding
8	tespetespe	18	asiny wang tespetespe	80	udiny tesped	800	udiny mädäginy tesped
9	paye nuxu	19	asiny wang paye nuxu	90	udiny tesped wang asiny	900	udiny mädäginy paye nuxu
10	asiny	20	ud	100	udiny mädäg	1000	päsic nuxu

Intermediate numbers, e.g. 785 are built similar to English, from front to end: udiny mädäginy paxtänding (700) wang (and) udiny tesped (80) wang (and) mädäg (5).

==== Ordinal numbers ====
The following table shows how ordinal numbers are built.

Ordinal numbers in Caning - Days
Caning	Translation	Caning	Translation
xongi näs nuxuzeneng	first day	xongondi näs paxtändingzeneng	seventh day
xongondi näs pätaxeneng	second day	xongondi näs tespetespedeneng	eighth day
xongondi näs kodoseneng	third day	xongondi näs paye nuxuzeneng	ninth day
xongondi näs tespedeneng	fourth day	xongondi näs asinygeneng	tenth day
xongondi näs mädägkeneng	fifth day	xongondi näs asiny wang nuxuzeneng	eleventh day
xongondi näs arandeneng	sixth day	xongondi näs asiny wang pätaxeneng	twelfth day

Numbers usually come after the noun with a modifier suffix, in this case -eneng.

Example of cardinal and ordinal numbers in the same sentence
Caning	English
Edekeny sawuno sasog täsa mänang tä sängga kodos, na xongondi näs kodoseneng cäläpede ta atänäce ka,	For the next three days, they came and did the same, and on the third day she said to her grandchild,
