= Sila language (Chad) =

Daju language of Chad

Daju Dar Sila
- Bokorike
- Native to: Chad, Sudan
- Region: Daju Hills
- Native speakers: (70,000 cited 2000–2009)
- Language family: Nilo-Saharan?: Eastern Sudanic?; Southern Eastern?; Daju; Western; Daju Dar Sila
- Writing system: Unwritten

Language codes
- ISO 639-3: dau
- Glottolog: dars1235

The Sila language, also known as Dar Sila, Dar Sila Daju, Bokor, Bokorike, Bokoruge, Dadjo, Dajou, Daju, and Sula, is an Eastern Sudanic language, one of three closely related languages in the area called "Daju" (the other two being the Nyala language and the Daju Mongo language). It is spoken in Chad near the Darfur border, with migration into Sudan. There are two dialects, Sila proper and Mongo, the latter not to be confused with Daju Mongo.
