= Nyala language (Sudan) =

Daju language spoken in Sudan

Daju, Dar Fur
- Bekke
- Native to: Sudan
- Region: West Darfur, South Darfur, South Kordofan
- Ethnicity: Dar Fur Daju
- Native speakers: 110,000 (2022)
- Language family: Nilo-Saharan?: Eastern Sudanic; Southern Eastern?; Daju; Western; Daju, Dar Fur
- Dialects: Nyala; Lagowa
- Writing system: Latin

Language codes
- ISO 639-3: daj
- Glottolog: darf1239

Linguistic map of the non-Arab peoples of Darfur.

Nyala, also known as Dar Fur, Darfur Daju, Daju Darfur, Beke, Dagu, Daju Ferne and Fininga, is an Eastern Sudanic language of Sudan, one of three closely related languages in the area called "Daju" (the other two being the Daju Mongo language and the Sila language). It is spoken near Nyala, the capital of South Darfur province by the Dar Fur Daju people. There are two divergent dialects: Nyala and Lagowa.

The Lagowa dialect of South Kordofan is spoken in Dar el Kabira, Jebel Miheila, Lagawa, Nyukri, Silecce, Tamanyik, and Warina area villages (Ethnologue, 22nd edition).

== Phonology ==
=== Consonants ===
| | | Labial | Alveolar | Palatal | Velar | Glottal |
|---|---|---|---|---|---|---|
| Plosive | voiceless | p | t | c | k | |
| Plosive | voiced | b | d | ɟ | ɡ | |
| Plosive | implosive | ɓ | ɗ | ʄ | | |
| Fricative | | (f) | s | ʃ | | h |
| Nasal | | m | n | ɲ | ŋ | |
| Trill | | | r | | | |
| Approximant | | w | l | j | | |

- /p/ can also be realized as [f]
- /r/ can be heard as a trill [r] or a flap [ɾ] in free variation.

=== Vowels ===
| | Front | Central | Back |
|---|---|---|---|
| Close | i | | u |
| Mid | e | ə | o |
| Open | | a | |

- Vowels /o, u/ can also be realized as [ɒ, ʊ].
