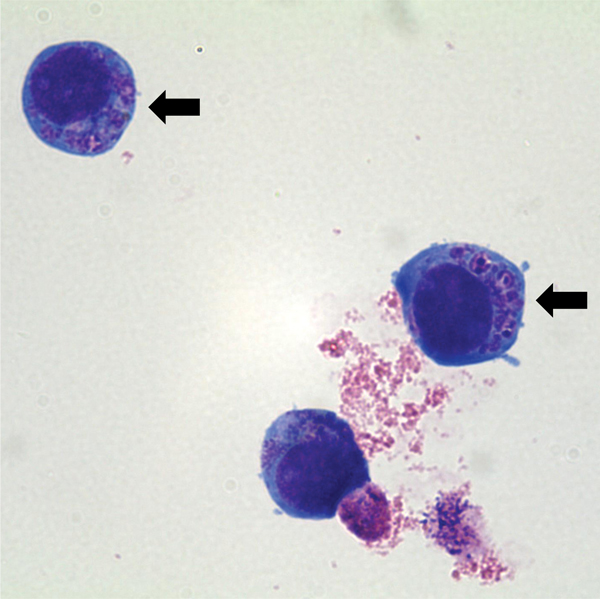
- Human HL60 cells containing Anaplasma phagocytophilum (indicated by arrows) which are basophilic intracytoplasmic inclusions when stained with Wright-Giemsa stain

Scientific classification
- Domain: Bacteria
- Kingdom: Pseudomonadati
- Phylum: Pseudomonadota
- Class: Alphaproteobacteria
- Subclass: "Rickettsidae"
- Order: Rickettsiales
- Family: Ehrlichiaceae
- Genus: Anaplasma
- Species: A. phagocytophilum

Binomial name
- Anaplasma phagocytophilum (Foggie 1949) Dumler et al. 2001

Synonyms
- Rickettsia phagocytophila ovis Rickettsia phagocytophila Cytoecetes phagocytophila Cytoecetes phagocytophila

= Anaplasma phagocytophilum =

Species of bacterium

Anaplasma phagocytophilum (formerly Ehrlichia phagocytophilum) is a Gram-negative bacterium that is unusual in its tropism to neutrophils. It causes anaplasmosis in sheep and cattle, also known as tick-borne fever and pasture fever, and also causes the zoonotic disease human granulocytic anaplasmosis.

A. phagocytophilum is a Gram-negative, obligate bacterium of neutrophils. It causes human granulocytic anaplasmosis, which is a tick-borne rickettsial disease. Because this bacterium invades neutrophils, it has a unique adaptation and pathogenetic mechanism.

== Biology ==
A. phagocytophilum is a small, obligate, intracellular bacterium with a Gram-negative cell wall. It is 0.2–1.0 μm and lacks a lipopolysaccharide biosynthetic machinery. The bacterium first resides in an early endosome, where it acquires nutrients for binary fission and grows into small groups called morulae. This bacterium prefers to grow within myeloid or granulocytic cells.

=== Hosts ===
Anaplasma phagocytophilum has a broad host range and infects a variety of wild and domestic mammals. Documented hosts include humans, sheep, goats, cattle, horses, dogs, cats, deer, and small mammals such as rodents and chipmunks. In North America, small mammals are considered important reservoir hosts in some transmission cycles, although reservoir competence varies among species and ecological settings.

== Role in human disease ==
A. phagocytophilum causes human granulocytic anaplasmosis (HGA). This disease was first identified in 1990, although this pathogen was known to cause veterinary disease since 1932. Since 1990, incidence of HGA has increased, and it is now recognized in Europe. This disease was first identified due to a Wisconsin patient who died with a severe febrile illness two weeks after a tick bite. During the last stage of the infection, a group of small bacteria was seen within the neutrophils in the blood. Other symptoms include fever, headache, absence of skin rash, leucopenia, thrombocytopenia, and mild injury to the liver.

== Clinical signs in animals ==
The disease is multisystemic, but the most severe changes are anaemia and leukopenia. This organism causes lameness, which can be confused with symptoms of Lyme disease, another tick-borne illness. It is a vector-borne zoonotic disease whose morula can be visualized within neutrophils (a type of white blood cell) from the peripheral blood and synovial fluid. It can cause lethargy, ataxia, loss of appetite, and weak or painful limbs.

== Bacterial mechanism ==
A. phagocytophilum binds to fucosylated and sialylated scaffold proteins on neutrophil and granulocyte surfaces. A type IV secretion apparatus is known to help in the transfer of molecules between the bacterium and the host. The most studied ligand is PSGL-1 (CD162). The bacterium adheres to PSGL-1 (CD162) through the 44-kDa major surface protein-2 (Msp2). After the bacterium enters the cell, the endosome stops maturation and does not accumulate markers of late endosomes or phagolysosomes. Because of this, the vacuole does not become acidified or fused to lysosomes. A. phagocytophilum then divides until cell lysis or when the bacteria leave to infect other cells.

This bacterium has the ability to affect neutrophils by altering their function. It can survive the first encounter with the host cell by detoxifying superoxide produced by neutrophil phagocyte oxidase assembly. It also disrupts normal neutrophil function, such as endothelial cell adhesion, transmigration, motility, degranulation, respiratory burst, and phagocytosis. It causes an increase in the secretion of IL-8, a chemoattractant that increases the phagocytosis of neutrophils. The purpose of this is to increase bacterial dissemination into the neutrophil.

== Laboratory diagnosis ==
These tests can be performed to determine an A. phagocytophilum infection:

1. Indirect immunofluorescence assay is the principal test used to detect infection. The acute and convalescent phase serum samples can be evaluated to look for a four-fold change in antibody titer to A. phagocytophilum.
2. Intracellular Inclusions (morulae) are visualized in granulocytes on Wright- or Giemsa- stained blood smears.
3. Polymerase chain reaction assays are used to detect A. phagocytophilum DNA.

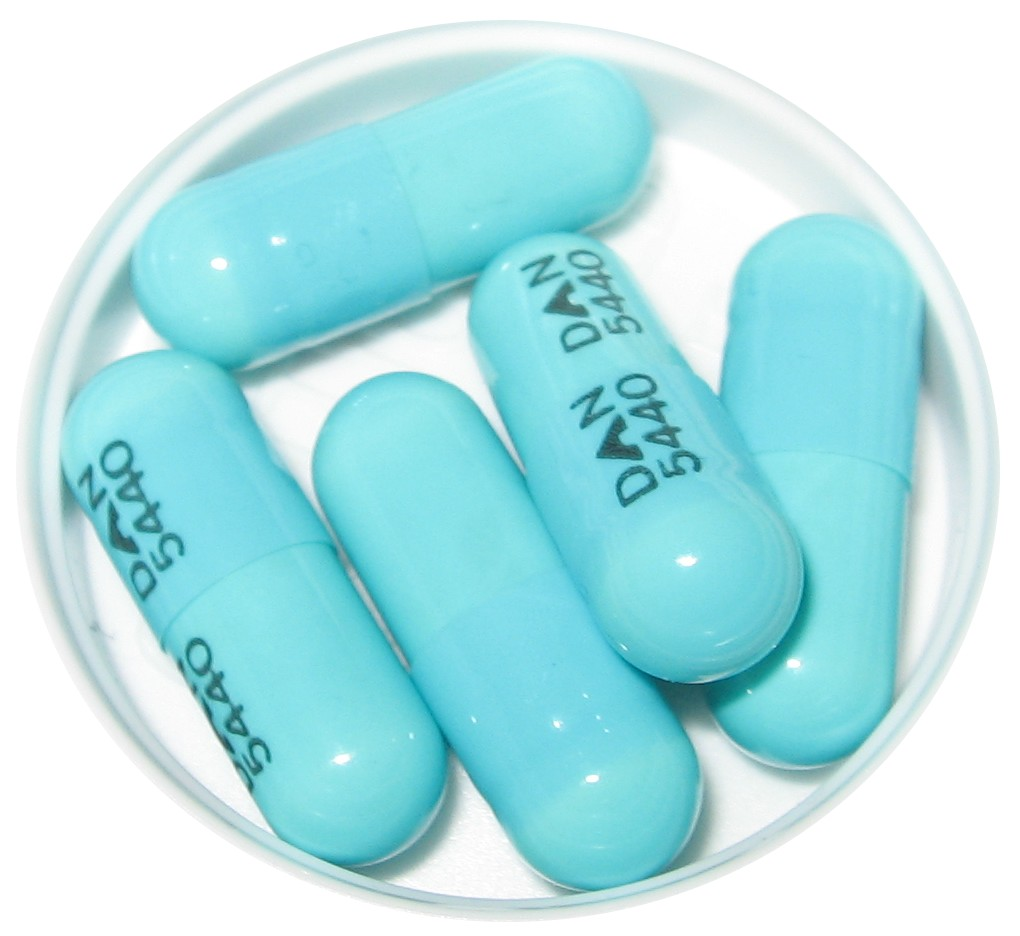
Doxycycline

== Antibiotic therapy ==
Patients with HGA undergo doxycycline therapy, 100 mg twice daily until the patient's fever subsides for at least 3 days. This drug has been the most beneficial to those patients infected with the bacteria. Some other tetracycline drugs are also effective. In general, patients with symptoms of HGA and unexplained fever after a tick exposure should receive empiric doxycycline therapy while their diagnostic tests are pending, especially if they experience leukopenia and/or thrombocytopenia.

In animals, antibiotics such as oxytetracycline, sulphamethazine, sulphadimidine, doxycycline, and trimethoprim-sulphonamides have been used.
