= Logorik people =

Ethnic group in Sudan

The Logorik are an ethnic group in the southern part of Sudan. They are one of seven distinct ethnicities comprising the Daju people. They speak the Logorik language, a Nilo-Saharan language. They live in the north, central Nuba Mountains in the Jebel Liguri hills area northeast of Kadugli. The population of this ethnic group was 2,000 in 1971.

It is generally agreed that the Logorik people came from a very early migration (perhaps 2,000 years ago) out of the Daju Urheimat in the Marrah Mountains. There they carved out their own small territory in the midst of the original inhabitants of the eastern Nuba Mountains, the Kordofanian tribes, as well as amongst later migrating tribal/linguistic groupings: the Nyimang tribes, the Temein tribes, and the Kadugli tribes. The migration of the Hill Nubian tribes in the Nuba Hills is generally seen as coming after the main Daju migration. The Nuba Mountains have generally been an area of "retreat" for persecuted groups seeking security hence the significant linguistic diversity.
