= Logorik language =

Daju language spoken in Sudan

Logorik
- Laggori, Liguri, Logori, Subori
- Native to: Sudan
- Region: South Kordofan
- Ethnicity: Logorik
- Native speakers: (2,000 cited 1971)
- Language family: Nilo-Saharan?: Eastern Sudanic; Southern Eastern?; Daju; Eastern; Logorik
- Dialects: Liguri; Saburi; Tallau
- Writing system: Latin

Language codes
- ISO 639-3: liu
- Glottolog: logo1261
- ELP: Logorik
- Logorik is classified as Critically Endangered by the UNESCO Atlas of the World's Languages in Danger.

Logorik, Subori, or Saburi is a (critically) endangered language spoken in Eastern Sudan and Western Chad.

== General information ==
It is a part of the Nilo-Saharan group and the subcategory of the Eastern Daju languages. It is spoken by the Subori people in the Nuba Mountains and South Kordofan.

Meinhof claims, that there are hardly any similarities between this language and other Kordofan languages vocabulary-wise. At the same time, the Logorik-speaking community is overwhelmingly bilingual; other dominating languages being, among others, Arabic, (due to the Arabic migration in the region). This causes a high percentage of loanwords and grammatical borrowings (mostly Arabic) in the Logorik language.

== Phonetics ==
=== Vowels ===
Logorik vowels
	Front	Central	Back
High	i		u
Mid-High	e		o
Mid		ə	
Low		a	

=== Consonants ===
Logorik consonants
		Labial	Alveolar	Retroflex	Palatal	Velar	Glottal
Plosive/Affricate	Voiceless	p	t	(ʈ)	ʧ	k	(ʔ)
Plosive/Affricate	Voiced	b	d	(ɖ)	tʒ (Note: written tʒ in Manfredi 2013)	g	
Implosive		ɓ	ɗ		ʄ		
Fricative	Voiceless	(f) (Note: /f/ is quite rare. It usually appears in loanwords and other borrowings.)	s			x	h
Fricative	Voiced		z				
Nasal		m	n		ɲ	ŋ	
Rhotic			r	(ɽ)			
Lateral			l				
Approximant		w					

Also, it is worth mentioning, that the glottal stops, symbolized by (ʔ), are present in Logorik.

== Tonality ==
Logorik is a tonal language, meaning there are high tones and falling tones. When it comes to tones, the tone of a preceding syllable must be different from the one coming after it.

== Grammar ==
=== Genus ===
There is no feminine genus in the Logorik language morphology-wise. There are however six other classes and their plural form depends on the final position of the singular form.

=== Nouns ===
A plural form of a noun is created by adding an appropriate suffix.

=== Verbs ===
There are only perfective and imperfective conjugations documented. Prefixes and suffixes play a very important role in signaling the context/tense, e.g. future tense is shown by the prefix and háŋ-; habitual activities by a suffix -cà.
