= Sergiyev Posad-6 =

Russian government research institute

Coordinates: 56°15′26″N 38°07′11″E

Sergiyev Posad-6 (Russian: Сергиев Посад-6 (Note: Russian: Сергиев Посад-6, IPA: [ˈsʲɛrgʲɪ(j)ɪf pɐˈsat ʂɛsʲtʲ])), formerly known as Zagorsk-6 (Note: Russian: Загорск-6, IPA: [ˈsʲɛrgʲɪ(j)ɪf pɐˈsat ʂɛsʲtʲ]) is a biological weapon production and research facility, serving as the main site of the 48th Central Scientific Research Institute of Medicine of the Ministry of Defence (48 CNII), based in a former closed settlement near the town of Sergiyev Posad in Moscow Oblast, Russia. It specializes in pathogens causing hemorrhagic fever (including Ebola) and smallpox. In the Soviet era the institute was known as Zagorsk Institute (from the settlement's name Zagorsk-6).

Sergiyev Posad-6 received infectious agents from international exchange programmes and from natural sources. Its employees raised animal hosts for the pathogens and then infected test subject animals to measure the pathogen's potential for use as a biological weapon and the effectiveness of vaccines, which they also worked on. Among the former, the institute validated the military use of Coxiella burnetii and weaponised the India-1967 strain of smallpox. In 1995, antibodies for emergency prophylaxis against Ebola were developed at Zagorsk Institute.

After the collapse of the USSR, the biological weapons research went on hiatus. The work resumed several years later; Zagorsk Institute was reorganised as one of the research centres under the 48th Central Scientific Research Institute. From 2021, the centre is undergoing a significant expansion as of 2024; several new high-containment buildings can be seen on satellite maps.

== History ==
=== Soviet Union ===
The Institute was founded in 1954 as the result of the merger of the disbanded open All-Union Scientific Research Institute for Vaccines and Sera (ASRIVS) and the closed Scientific Research Institute for Sanitation; the first commander of the Institute was M. I. Kostyuchenok. It occupied the ASRIVS' former facilities, which is the reason why older residents call the city "Vaccine" (Russian: Вакцина). The Soviet military leadership identified a lack of agencies working on military use of viruses and rickettsiales, and Zagorsk Institute had all the required high-containment biological facilities and equipment to conduct virology research. Colonel general Aleksandr Smirnov was personally overseeing the development of the Research institute and brought many top scientists, doctors and the best university graduates to work there. The pay and benefits were very lucrative, however, the oppressive security measures were hindering the work—for example, the associates of different laboratories could not talk to each other even if they belonged to the same department; another rule prevented the use of the Moscow libraries, so the researchers had to resort to experimentation.

Zagorsk Institute scientists tested many pathogens: the rickettsiology programmes worked on creating biological weapons based on Coxiella burnetii (causes Q fever), Rickettsia prowazekii (causes epidemic typhus), Rickettsia conorii (causes boutonneuse fever) and Rickettsia rickettsii (causes Rocky Mountain spotted fever). Among those, Coxiella burnetii was validated for use as a biological weapon. The virology and entomology programmes were interconnected in Zagorsk Institute because most viruses they studied were arboviruses. The employees raised mosquitoes who carried the yellow fever virus, Venezuelan equine encephalitis virus, and Japanese encephalitis virus; they also studied the military potential of viral hemorrhagic fever viruses and worked on vaccines, for example, for the Venezuelan equine encephalitis virus. The strains of hemorrhagic fever viruses reached the USSR from West Germany via an official strain exchange programme, despite urban legends about Soviet KGB agents who exhumed victims of the Marburg virus to get tissue samples.

The lead researchers working on the hemorrhagic fever viruses were Viktor Zhdanov (Marburg virus, Lassa virus, and Machupo virus), N. I. Gonchar and V. A. Pshenichnov (Marburg virus). Zagorsk Institute scientists attempted to create a cure for Marburg virus and unsuccessfully used gamma globulin on VECTOR lead scientists Nikolay Ustinov and L. A. Akinfeeva who got the Marburg virus. Most of this work occurred in the Building 18. In 1979, another R&D building was added to the institute: Building 78, which had better conditions and more modern equipment; its staff focussed on Ebola virus. The work on Ebola culminated in creating an antibody for emergency prophylaxis against it in 1995; the director of the Zagorsk Institute, Aleksandr Makhlay, was awarded the title of the Hero of the Russian Federation for this work. Zagorsk Institute scientists reportedly worked in Kindia, Republic of Guinea, possibly on Lassa virus.

Variola virus that causes smallpox was acquired by the Zagorsk Institute scientists sometime in late 1950s or early 1960s, potentially from the Indian visitor who became the index case of the 1959–1960 Moscow smallpox outbreak, or during the WHO-USSR virus strain exchange programme. The strain, called India-1967, was then weaponised and tested on Vozrozhdeniya Island. Other poxviruses were also studied; Zagorsk Institute researchers had success with detection and diagnosis, but treatment of these viruses remained a challenge. Zagorsk Institute had the capacity to produce viral and rickettsial bioweapon agents on the small scale, but not in industrial quantities.

=== Russia ===
After the collapse of the USSR in 1991, the Zagorsk-6 city was renamed Sergiyev Posad-6, and the Institute shut down almost all research and development due to the lack of funding. The existence of the Soviet biological weapon programme was acknowledged only in 1992, but the Zagorsk Institute facility has never been inspected by foreign citizens. In 1999, a new biological research centre was established on the grounds of the original institute.

The 2024 US State Department report "assesses that Russia maintains an offensive [biological weapons] program" and actively modernises the 48th Central Scientific Research Institute. Ten new buildings were erected, including at least four maximum pathogen protection level biological laboratories. The Russian state media released video footage of the ex-Minister of Defence Sergey Shoigu and the commander of the Russian NBC Protection Troops, Igor Kirillov, touring the facility. The expansion started in 2021 with the spending that year being five times the amount in 2016-2020; it continued throughout 2024. In May 2021, USA imposed sanctions on all three scientific research institutes in the 48 Central Scientific Research Institutes, including Sergiyev Posad-6.

== Name ==
The first name of this facility was Military Unit 62992, which was replaced with Scientific Research Institute of Medicine of the Ministry of Defence in Zagorsk (now Sergiyev Posad). "Zagorsk-6" and "Sergiyev Posad-6" are short names formed according to the Soviet practice for closed cities: the name of a nearby city and a special postcode. In 2006 it was renamed the Virological Center of the Ministry of Defense’s Institute of Microbiology. Sergiyev Posad-6 is one of the three facilities belonging to the 48th Central Scientific Research Institute.

== Buildings ==
During the first years, single scientists lived in barracks and families rented accommodation in Zagorsk and nearby villages (Zubtsovo, Varavino and Ryazantsy). Later, Zagorsk-6 housed up to 6,000 scientists and their family members, so the walled institute complex included many apartment complexes and at least one school. A vivarium was added to the Institute around 1954 to host animals used for experimental infections, pathogen propagation and testing of the treatments; the most important species there were primates such as green monkeys, rhesus macaques and baboons. The institute's scientific-technical library was opened in 1954 and hosted books from various Soviet scientific research institutes as well as the tomes taken from the Friedrich Loeffler Institute during the World War II—in total, more than 60,000 book volumes and about 80,000 periodicals as of 2004.

Of the other documented buildings, Buildings 18 and 78 were used for Research and Development while Building 5 was for the Information Analysis department. The site was first equipped with slide rules and German electromechanical calculators, but acquired a Minsk-22 computer in 1968 and ES PEVM in 1983. It expanded its scope in the 2000s by participating in the Unified System for Identification and Estimation of Scales and Consequences of the Use of Weapons of Mass Destruction (Note: Единая система выявления и оценки масштабов и последствий применения оружия массового поражения и аварий (разрушений) на РХБ-опасных объектах (ЕСВОП)) and supporting its biological branch. As of 2012, it works on the mathematical models of the epidemiological processes for the Russian Ministry of Defence and the Russian Academy of Medical Sciences. In 1954, Zagorsk Institute established the Museum of Viruses and Rickettsiae; Roza Lukina was his first director and occupied this position for 35 years. The museum's collection includes strains of the most pathogenic hemorrhagic fever viruses.

== Commanders ==
- 1954 to 1959: Mikhail Ivanovich Kostyuchenok (Михаил Иванович Костюченок, major general, 1898−1918);
- 1959 to 1966: Vladimir Yakovlevich Podolyan (Владимир Яковлевич Подолян, major general, 1907−1984);
- 1966 to 1987: Sergey Ivanovich Prigoda (Сергей Иванович Пригода, 1919−1999), lieutenant general of the Medical Service;
- 1987 to 1990: Viktor Nikolayevich Karpov (Виктор Николаевич Карпов, major general);
- 1990 to 1999: Aleksandr Aleksandrovich Makhlay (Александр Александрович Махлай, major general, born in 1944);
- July 1999 to at least 2004: Vladimir Alekseyevich Maksimov (Владимир Алексеевич Максимов, colonel, born in 1938);
- 2004 to 2011:
- from 2011: Sergey Vladimorovich Borisevich (Сергей Владимирович Борисевич, born in 1967).

== Bibliography ==
- Krutov, Mark; Dobrynin, Sergei (17 December 2024). "Inside A Secret, Expanding Russian Lab Site With A Bioweapons Legacy". Radio Free Europe/Radio Liberty. Archived from the original on 21 December 2024.
- Leitenberg, Milton; Zilinskas, Raymond A.; Kuhn, Jens H. (2012). The Soviet biological weapons program: a history. Harvard University Press. ISBN 978-0-674-04770-9.
- Warrick, Joby; Ley, Jarrett (25 October 2024). "Satellite images show major expansion at Russian site with secret bioweapons past". Washington Post.
