= C19orf47 =

Protein-coding gene found in humans

Identifiers
- Aliases: C19orf47, chromosome 19 open reading frame 47
- External IDs: MGI: 1913617; GeneCards: C19orf47

Gene location (Human)
Chr.	Chromosome 19 (human)
Band	19q13.2	Start	40,319,536 bp
Band	19q13.2	End	40,348,527 bp

Gene location (Mouse)
Chr.	Chromosome 7 (mouse)
Band	7|7 A3	Start	27,252,658 bp
Band	7|7 A3	End	27,281,524 bp
RNA expression pattern
Bgee	Human / Mouse (ortholog); Top expressed in: apex of heart; muscle of thigh; gastrocnemius muscle; right auricle of heart; left ventricle; left testis; right testis; prefrontal cortex; C1 segment; popliteal artery / Top expressed in: muscle of thigh; skeletal muscle tissue; interventricular septum; soleus muscle; quadriceps femoris muscle; gastrocnemius muscle; masseter muscle; medial head of gastrocnemius muscle; lip; tibialis anterior muscle; More reference expression data
BioGPS	n/a
Orthologs
Databases	NCBI: entry; OMA: entry
Species	Human	Mouse
Entrez	126526	66367
Ensembl	ENSG00000160392	ENSMUSG00000049643
UniProt	Q8N9M1	Q8R3Y5
RefSeq (mRNA)	NM_001256440; NM_001256441; NM_178830	NM_001122767; NM_175107; NM_001374792
RefSeq (protein)	NP_001243369; NP_001243370	NP_001116239; NP_780316; NP_001361721
Location (UCSC)	Chr 19: 40.32 – 40.35 Mb	Chr 7: 27.25 – 27.28 Mb
PubMed search
- Wikidata
View/Edit Human	View/Edit Mouse

Chromosome 19 open reading frame 47 is a protein that in humans is encoded by the C19orf47 gene. Aliases include Chromosome 19 Open Reading Frame 47, FLJ36888, DKZp686P05129, and LOCI26526.

== Gene ==
Homo sapiens C19orf47 is located in cytogenetic band 19q13.2. It covers 28.98 kilobases from 40,854,420 to 40,825,543 on the minus strand. The gene has 8 exons in the isoform 1 precursor, the last of which is the longest and comprises over half of the mRNA transcript.

== mRNA ==
Transcription of Homo sapiens C19orf47 produces 13 different mRNAs, with 12 alternatively spliced variants and 1 unspliced form. Isoforms and the proteins encoded by them are shown in the table below. Homo sapiens C19orf47 has broad expression in heart, testes, and other tissues.

Isoforms of C19orf47.

Isoform number	Nucleotide Accession	mRNA length (bp)	Protein Accession	Protein Length (aa)
NM1	NM_001256440.1	2104	NP_001243369.1	422
NM2	NM_001256441.2	3611	NP_001243370.1	385
X1	XM_017026291.2	3608	XP_016881780.1	384
X2	XM_005258520.3	3625	XP_005258577.1	421
X3	XM_017026292.3	1407	XP_016881781.1	366
X4	XM_017026293.3	1404	XP_016881782.1	365
X5	XM_047438175.1	1421	XP_047294131.1	402
X6	XM_024451364.2	3507	XP_024307132.1	344
X7	XM_047438176.1	3504	XP_047294132.1	343
X8	XM_024451365.2	4638	XP_024307133.1	385
X8	XM_047438177.1	4671	XP_047294133.1	385
X9	XM_011526460.3	3524	XP_011524762.1	381
X10	XM_047438178.1	3668	XP_047294134.1	355
X11	XM_047438179.1	3241	XP_047294135.1	281

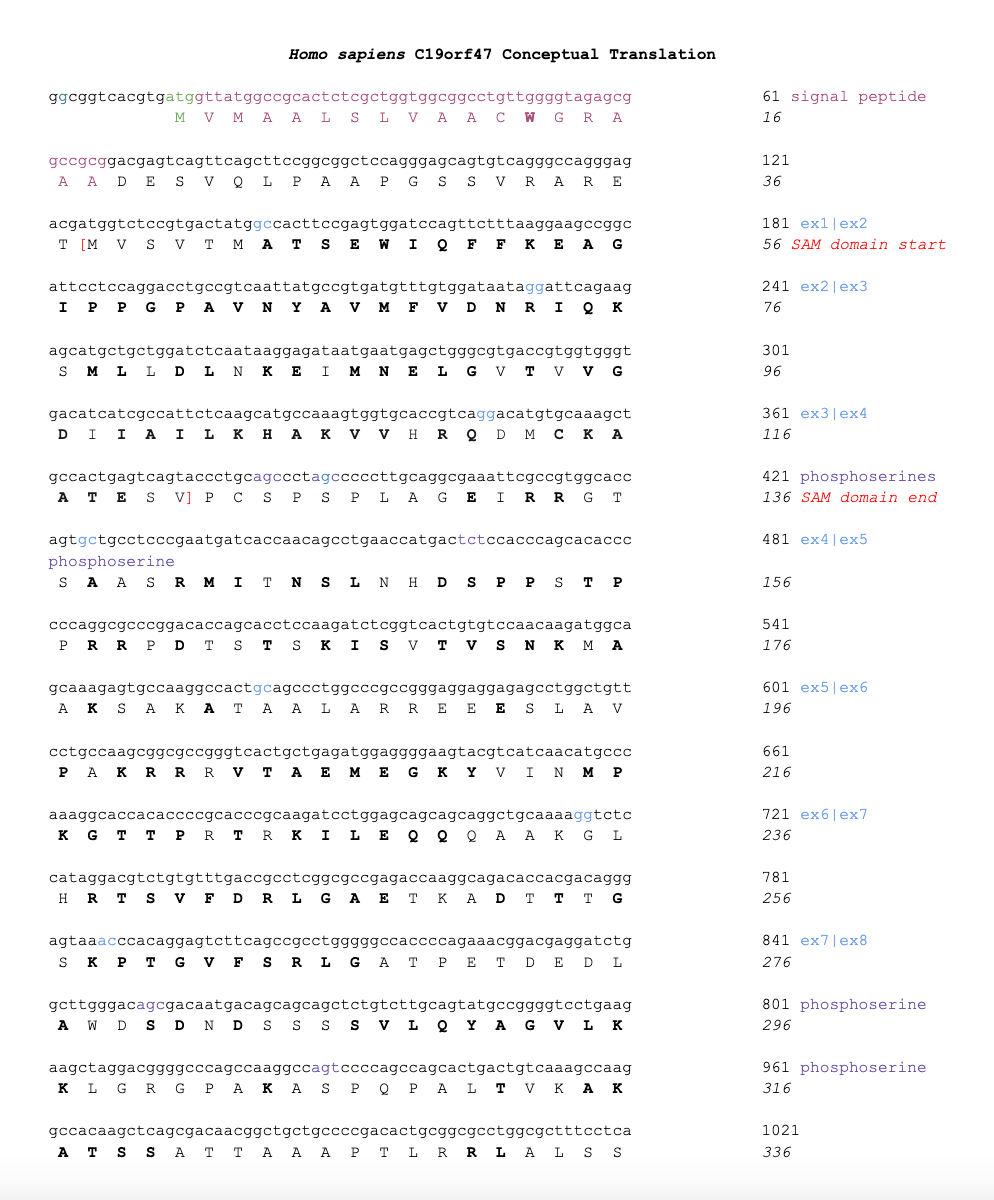
Conceptual translation of C19orf47 using SIXFRAME. Exon-exon boundaries are in blue, start codon is in green, and stop codon is red. PolyA signal sequence is shown in dark orange, polyA sites are shown in orange. Base pair and amino acid numbering is shown. Conserved amino acids in close orthologs are shown bolded.

== Protein ==
The C19orf47 gene isoform 1 precursor encodes for a 422 amino acid protein. The protein is located in the nucleoplasm and nucleus of the cell.

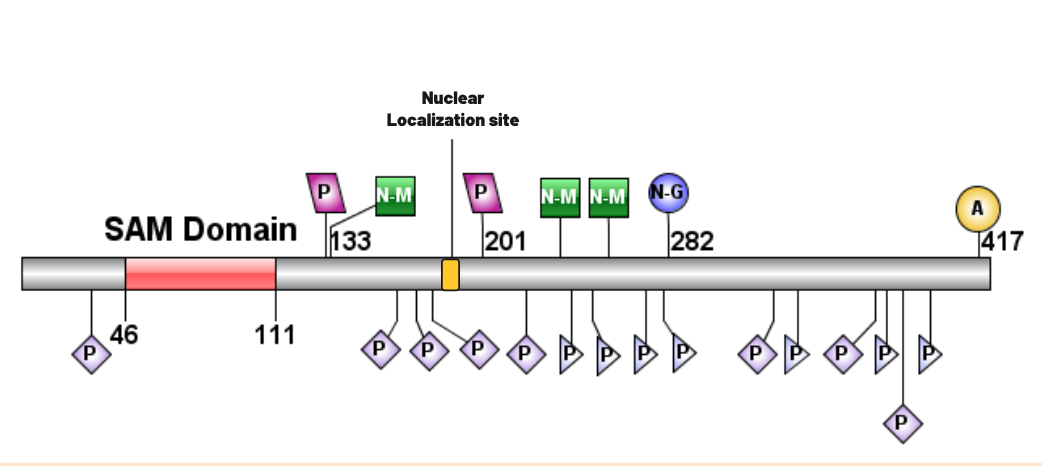
SAM domain is shown in red and nuclear localization site shown in yellow. Amidation site shown with yellow circle, N-glycosylation site shown with blue circle, cAMP- and cGMP-dependent protein kinase phosphorylation sites shown with purple rhombus, Casein kinase II phosphorylation is shown with light blue triangles, N-myristoylation sites shown with green squares, and protein kinase C phosphorylation sites shown with light purple diamonds.

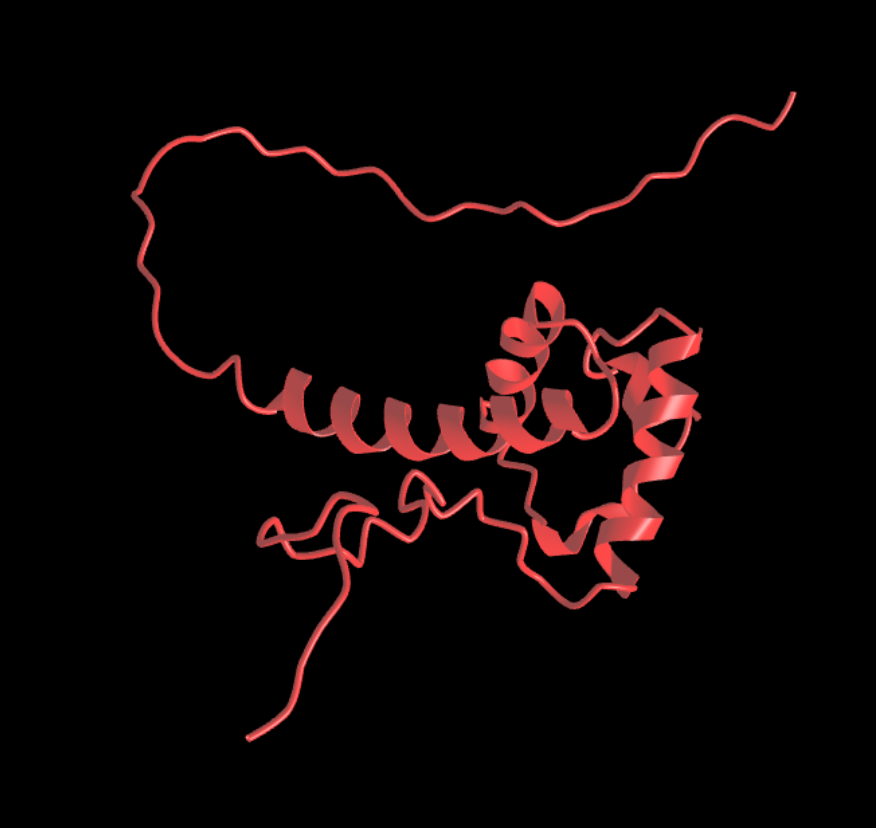
C19orf47 tertiary structure from iCn3D

=== Interacting proteins ===
The following proteins have predicted interactions with C19orf47. Interacting proteins with C19orf47 in humans. Notes with important information are shown.

Abbreviated Name	Full Name	Additional Notes
PARK2	Parkin RBR E3 Ubiquitin Protein Ligase	Component of multiprotein E3 ubiquitin ligase complex. Mutations are known to cause Parkinson’s disease.
NSP3	Non-structural protein 3	SARS-CoV-2 protein
ORF14	Open reading frame 14	SARS-CoV-2 protein
MYC	V-Myc Avian Myelocytomatosis Viral Oncogene Homolog 2 3	Proto-oncogene, forms a heterodimer with related transcription factor for MAX.
DDX39B	DExD-Box Helicase 39B	RNA-dependent ATPase that mediates ATP hydrolysis during mRNA splicing.
C17orf85	Nuclear Cap-Binding Protein Subunit 3	Associates with NCBP1/CBP80 to form an alternative cap-binding complex (CBC) which plays a key role in mRNA export.
NXF1	Nuclear RNA Export Factor 1	Member of a family of nuclear RNA export factor genes.
THOC2	THO Complex 2	Multiprotein complex binds specifically to spliced mRNAs to facilitate mRNA export.
YWHAQ	Tyrosine 3-Monooxygenase/Tryptophan 5-Monooxygenase Activation Protein, Theta Polypeptide	Mediates signal transduction by binding to phosphoserine-containing proteins.

== Homology ==
C19orf47 is found in organisms including mammals, reptiles, amphibian, fish, insects, and plant.

Current orthologs of human C19orf47. Sequence identity and similarity are shown.

C19orf47	Genus, Species	Common Name	Taxonomic Group	Date of Divergence (MYA)	Accession Number	Sequence Length (aa)	Identity	Similarity
Mammalia	Homo sapiens	Human	Primates	0	NP_001243369.1	422	100.0%	100.0%
Mammalia	Mus musculus	Mouse	Rodentia	87	XP_036009244.1	397	75.5%	80.2%
Mammalia	Castor canadensis	American Beaver	Rodentia	87	XP_020022531.1	382	71.3%	74.7%
Reptilia	Gopherus flavomarginatus	Bolson Tortoise	Testudines	319	XP_050784538.1	386	63.3%	72.9%
Reptilia	Dermochelys coriacea	Leatherback Sea Turtle	Testudines	319	XP_038238045.2	449	62.3%	72.0%
Reptilia	Varanus komodoensis	Komodo Dragon	Squamata	319	XP_044281356.1	395	60.2%	69.2%
Reptilia	Alligator sinensis	Chinese Alligator	Crocodylia	319	XP_025068843.1	388	54.7%	63.3%
Aves	Haliaeetus leucocephalus	Bald Eagle	Falconiformes	319	XP_010564700.1	380	60.2%	69.1%
Aves	Phalacrocorax carbo	Great Cormorant	Suliformes	319	XP_009501755.1	381	58.5%	67.3%
Aves	Gallus gallus	Chicken	Galliformes	319	XP_015129410.4	374	36.6%	45.5%
Amphibia	Xenopus tropicalis	Frog	Anura	352	NP_001005016.1	398	54.2%	64.5%
Fish	Protopterus annectens	West African Lungfish	Lepidosireniformes	408	XP_043937251.1	393	46.4%	57.0%
Fish	Latimeria chalumnae	West Indian Ocean Coelacanth	Coelacanthiformes	415	XP_014348608.1	381	58.2%	69.7%
Fish	Danio rerio	Zebrafish	Cypriniformes	429	NP_001038706.1	392	48.6%	59.5%
Fish	Leucoraja erinacea	Little Skate	Rajiformes	462	XP_055519598.1	395	53.0%	64.2%
Fish	Petromyzon marinus	Sea Lamprey	Petromyzontiformes	563	XP_032803651.1	452	41.6%	52.4%
Arthropods	Rhipicephalus sanguineus	Brown Dog Tick	Ixodida	686	XP_037499932.1	428	29.3%	39.9%
Arthropods	Biomphalaria glabrata	Bloodfluke Planorb	Planorbidae	686	XP_055879100.1	370	26.6%	36.0%
Arthropods	Polistes fuscatus	Northern Paper Wasp	Hymenoptera	686	XP_043494673.1	409	24.1%	39.3%
Plants	Gossypium anomalum	Wild Cotton	Malvales	1530	KAG8495680.1	266	11.5%	20.6%

== Clinical significance ==
One study discusses the identification of four novel mutations in the TUBB4A gene associated with laryngeal and cervical dystonia, a rare neurological disorder. These mutations were found in several affected families, and the study highlights the complexity of this genetic condition, with evidence of incomplete penetrance in some cases. Laryngeal dystonia, often the initial symptom, is a prominent feature of the disease. Of note, there was presence of a variant in the C19orf47 gene in one family. It was shown that the variant in the gene TUBB4A was more likely to be the source of the phenotype, as C19orf47 has low expression in the brain.
