= Canine vector-borne disease =

A canine vector-borne disease (CVBD) is one of "a group of globally distributed and rapidly spreading illnesses that are caused by a range of pathogens transmitted by arthropods including ticks, fleas, mosquitoes and phlebotomine sandflies." CVBDs are important in the fields of veterinary medicine, animal welfare, and public health. Some CVBDs are of zoonotic concern.

Many CVBD are transmissible to humans as well as companion animals. Some CVBD are fatal; most can only be controlled, not cured. Therefore, infection should be avoided by preventing arthropod vectors from feeding on the blood of their preferred hosts. While it is well known that arthropods transmit bacteria and protozoa during blood feeds, viruses are also becoming recognized as another group of transmitted pathogens of both animals and humans.

Some canine vector-borne pathogens of major zoonotic concern are found worldwide, while others are localized by continent. Listed by vector, some such pathogens and their associated diseases are the following:

Phlebotomine sandflies (Psychodidae):

- Leishmania amazonensis, L. colombiensis, and L. infantum cause visceral leishmaniasis (see also canine leishmaniasis).
- L. braziliensis causes mucocutaneous leishmaniasis.
- L. tropica causes cutaneous leishmaniasis.
- L. peruviana and L. major cause localized cutaneous leishmaniasis.

Triatomine bugs (Reduviidae):

- Trypanosoma cruzi causes trypanosomiasis (Chagas disease).

Ticks (Ixodidae):

- Babesia canis subspecies (Babesia canis canis, B. canis vogeli, B. canis rossi, and B. canis gibsoni) cause babesiosis.
- Ehrlichia canis and E. chaffeensis cause monocytic ehrlichiosis.
- Anaplasma phagocytophilum causes granulocytic anaplasmosis.
- Borrelia burgdorferi causes Lyme disease.
- Rickettsia rickettsii causes Rocky Mountain spotted fever.
- Rickettsia conorii causes Mediterranean spotted fever.

Mosquitoes (Culicidae):

- Dirofilaria immitis and D. repens cause dirofilariasis.

Other parasites:

- Toxocara canis
- Echinococcus

Prevention and Control Strategies

Prevention Strategies

- Leishmania Vaccines: In regions such as Southern Europe and certain parts of Latin America, Leishmania infection, caused by the bite of infected sandflies, is a significant concern. Vaccination against Leishmania is an emerging preventive strategy. While no vaccine offers complete immunity, vaccines such as CaniLeish and Letifend are designed to reduce the severity of the disease and prevent clinical signs. Dogs in endemic areas may benefit from combining vaccination with vector control methods. Palatnik-de-Sousa (2012) reviews the development and efficacy of vaccines for canine leishmaniasis, a severe parasitic disease caused by Leishmania species. The author discusses two critical vaccines, CaniLeish and Leishmune, evaluating their ability to reduce clinical signs and prevent the spread of the disease by controlling parasite transmission. While vaccines don't offer complete immunity, they are an essential part of a broader strategy that includes vector control and prophylactic treatments to mitigate the burden of this disease in endemic areas.
- Tick and Flea Preventatives: Fleas and ticks are vectors for serious diseases like Lyme, Ehrlichiosis, and Anaplasmosis. Preventatives that target fleas and ticks are crucial in reducing the transmission of these pathogens.

These include:

- Spot-on treatments: Applied to the dog's skin (e.g., Frontline, Advantix), these treatments offer protection by killing ticks and fleas on contact and can last for several weeks (Beugnet & Franc, 2012).
- Oral preventatives: Medications like Bravecto or NexGard are chewable tablets that protect against ticks and fleas for up to three months. They work systemically, killing the parasites when they feed on the dog.
- Collars: Insecticidal collars (e.g., Seresto) provide long-lasting protection (up to eight months) and are impregnated with chemicals like imidacloprid or flumethrin, which repel and kill ticks and fleas (Stanneck et al., 2012).

Control Strategies

- Vector Control: focuses on reducing the population of disease-carrying vectors like ticks, mosquitoes, and sandflies, which transmit CVBDs. These strategies thereby target both the environment and the animal to prevent infection.
- Insecticide-Treated Dog Collars: continuously releases small amounts of insecticides to repel and kill ticks, fleas, and sandflies before they can transmit diseases. Collars like Scalibor and Seresto are popular due to their long-lasting effects (Stanneck et al., 2012).
- Environmental Management: Reducing vector habitats is critical in controlling the spread of diseases.
- Tick habitat management: Keeping dogs away from areas where ticks thrive (e.g., tall grasses, woods) can help limit exposure. Regular grooming and inspection of dogs for ticks are critical, especially after walks in tick-prone areas (Eisen et al.,2021).
- Flea control in homes: Fleas can quickly spread indoors. Regular vacuuming, washing pet bedding, and treating the environment with insecticides help break the flea lifecycle.
- Sandfly control: For dogs at risk of Leishmania, keeping them indoors during peak sandfly activity (dusk and dawn), using insecticide-treated bed nets, and reducing sandfly breeding sites (e.g., removing decaying organic matter) are effective strategies (Eisen et al.,2021).
