= Babesiosis of dogs =

Infectious disease in dogs

Babesiosis in dogs (synonym: "dog malaria", piroplasmosis) is an infectious disease caused by single-celled organisms of the genus Babesia in dogs, which causes the destruction of red blood cells and thus a more or less pronounced anaemia. The disease usually has an acute course with high fever and is fatal within a few days without treatment. It is transmitted by ticks. While babesiosis was primarily a "travellers' disease" until the 1970s, it now also occurs naturally north of the Alps due to the expansion of the distribution area of the meadow tick. The diagnosis is confirmed by detecting Babesia DNA or by microscopic examination of the blood. Antiprotozoal drugs are used for treatment.

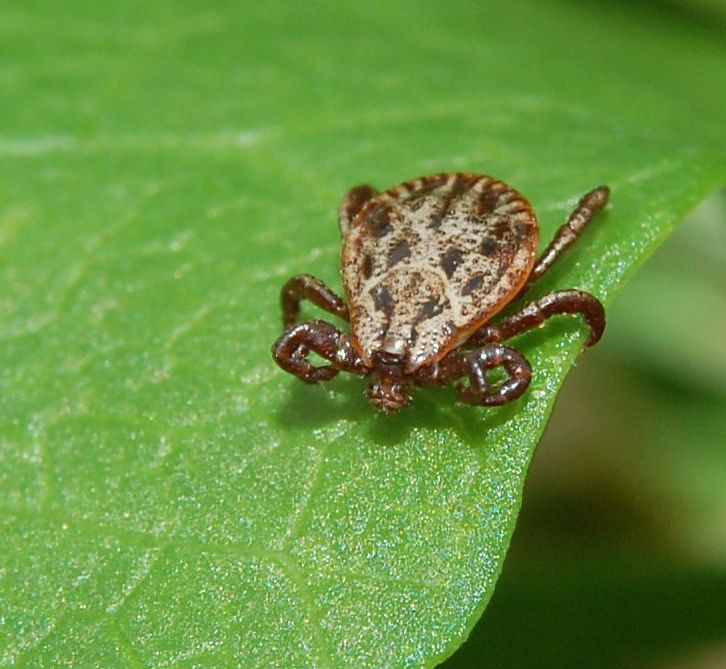
Deer tick – the most important carrier of babesiosis in dogs in Europe

Other animal species and humans are not at risk from the Babesia parasites that cause disease in dogs. However, other mammals can also contract diseases caused by Babesia parasites, which are usually host-specific.

== Pathogens and spread ==
Babesia are single-celled organisms that parasitise red blood cells. They belong to the Apicomplexa phylum. Part of their reproductive cycle takes place in an intermediate host – various tick species. Babesiosis in dogs is caused by several species of Babesia that are not pathogenic to other animal species. Although antibodies against Babesia canis were detected in horses in one study, the infection does not cause any clinical symptoms in these animals and is self-limiting. Nine genetically distinct species of Babesia are now known to infect dogs.

Babesia canis (Piana & Galli-Valerio, 1895) is a relatively large species of Babesia (2–4 × 4–7 μm) that occurs worldwide. Today, three subspecies are distinguished, which differ in terms of their DNA and vector, but not morphologically:

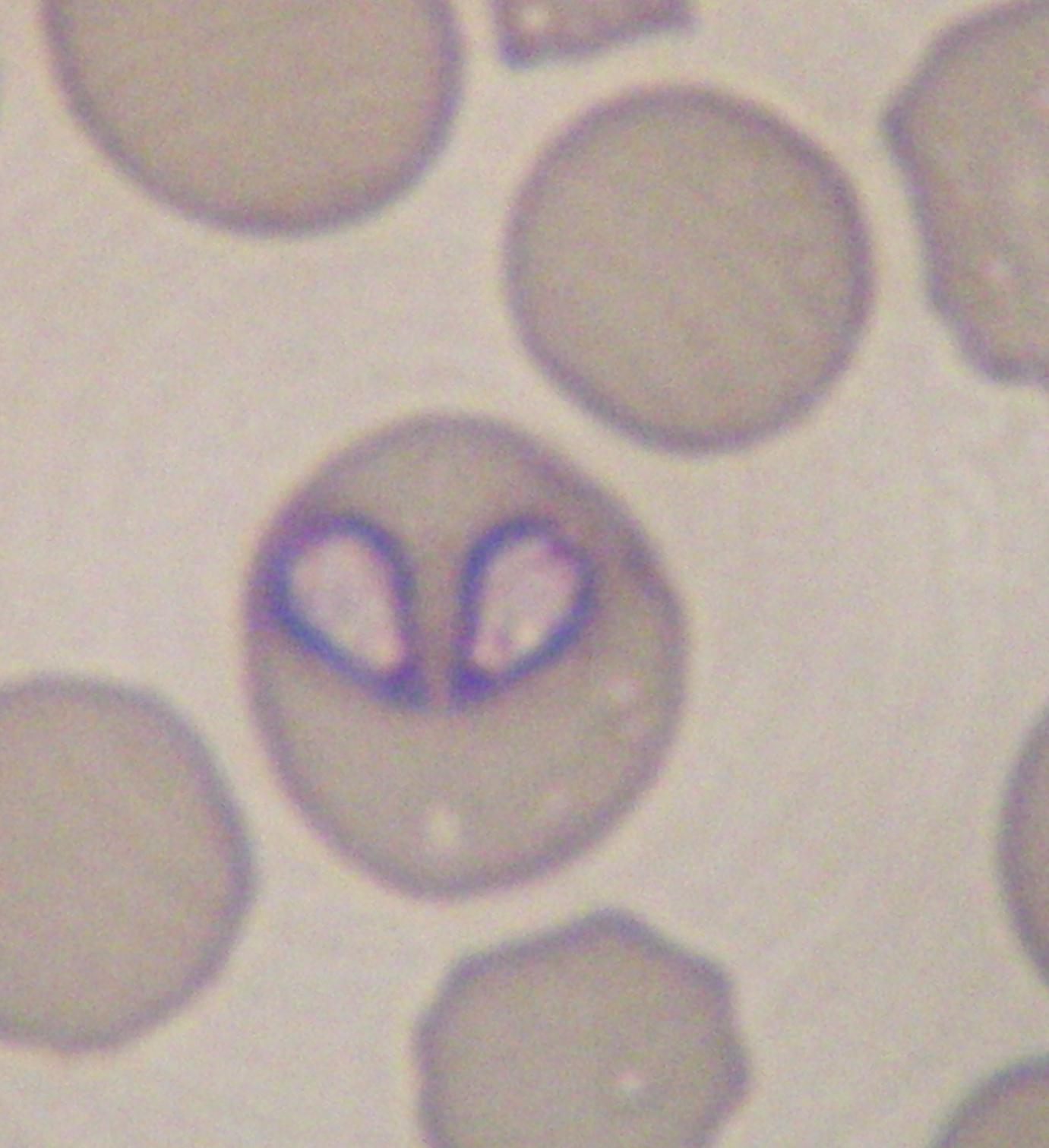
Babesia canis in an erythrocyte of a German Shepherd dog

- Babesia canis is transmitted by the meadow tick (Dermacentor reticulatus), which has now spread throughout Central Europe. This Babesia subspecies is the most common cause of disease in dogs in German-speaking countries. Originally found only in North Africa, northern and central Italy, France, and the southern parts of Hungary and Austria ("Mediterranean disease"), it now has natural foci in Germany, Switzerland, the Netherlands, and Poland. The pathogen is highly virulent. There are two strains. The French strain originates from the northern and eastern Mediterranean region and is now also found in some south-western regions of Germany. The Hungarian strain occurs mainly in the Balkans and Ukraine but is now also found in some regions of eastern Germany.
- Babesia canis vogeli is transmitted by the brown dog tick (Rhipicephalus sanguineus). Infections with this pathogen are rare in Central Europe and are mild. B. c. vogeli is widespread in North Africa, the Mediterranean region, and France.
- Babesia canis rossi is spread by Haemaphysalis elliptica and only occurs in Africa south of the Sahara. The pathogen is the most virulent species of Babesia.

In more recent studies, these three large Babesia species are also counted as separate species, and there are two further isolates (North Carolina isolate and Great Britain isolate) that indicate the existence of further large Babesia species.

Babesia gibsoni (Patton, 1910) is another species of Babesia found in dogs. It is smaller (1.1–2 × 1.2–4 μm) and therefore also morphologically distinguishable from B. canis. The pathogen is mainly found in Asia and the United States, with a distinction being made between an Asian and a California genotype. It is transmitted by ticks of the genera Haemaphysalis (Haemaphysalis spinosa) and Rhipicephalus. In 2007, two locally acquired infections with the Asian genotype were reported in Germany for the first time. A recent study suggests that the "small Babesia" of the California genotype should be classified as a separate species, Babesia conradae. The species Babesia vulpes (formerly Theileria annae), also classified as a "small Babesia", primarily infects foxes and occurs in the Pyrenees and North America. Isolated cases have also been reported in dogs in Germany. Its vector is probably the hedgehog tick (Ixodes hexagonus).

The first evidence of the disease was found in the USA in 1934. However, there were already reports of canine diseases in Italy in 1895 and in Africa in 1896 that pointed to babesiosis. Until the 1970s, the original distribution area of babesiosis (enzootic area) within Europe was limited to southern Europe, meaning that the disease occurred in Germany almost exclusively in dogs returning from holidays in this region ("Mediterranean disease"). The first Babesia vulpes infection was detected in Germany in 2000 in a dog originating from northern Spain. With the spread of the castor bean tick throughout Central Europe, local cases of disease are also occurring in Germany: around a third of dogs that have fallen ill have never been abroad. Although the infection rate of castor bean ticks with Babesia is still relatively low in Germany, it is steadily increasing. Around 0.5% of castor bean ticks are carriers of Babesia. After initially only localised infections were observed in the Upper Rhine region, there are now enzootic areas in Saarland, Rhineland-Palatinate, the Isar floodplains near Munich, the area around Regensburg, the Elbe floodplains, and Brandenburg. Currently, several thousand cases are reported in Germany each year. Of these, around 300–400 are local infections, almost all of which occur in Saarland and the Upper Rhine region.

== Disease development ==
Life cycle of Babesia canis

The transmission of the pathogen during a tick bite takes approximately 48 to 72 hours. Under experimental conditions, transmission of B. c. canis has been detected as early as 12 hours after the tick has attached itself. When the tick attaches itself to the host, the sporozoites dormant in various organs are activated by irritation of the nervous system and develop into kinetes, which then migrate to the salivary glands and enter the dog's bloodstream with the tick's saliva. In addition to transmission by ticks, infection can also be transmitted from dog to dog via blood transfusion or blood-to-blood contact, for example, during fights. Transmission from the mother to her offspring ("vertical infection") is also suspected and has been proven for B. gibsoni.

The sporozoites invade the red blood cells (erythrocytes) of dogs and undergo a phase of asexual reproduction (merogony). The resulting developmental stages (known as merozoites) damage the erythrocytes, are released after their destruction, and can then invade new, uninfected erythrocytes. In response to the infection, the organism initially shows an acute phase reaction with an increase in C-reactive protein and fibrinogen, a thrombocyte and leukocyte decrease, and a drop in blood pressure. This is followed by an immune response with the formation of IgG and IgM antibodies. However, the pathogen is not completely eliminated by the dog's immune system, meaning that these animals represent a constant source of infection (pathogen reservoir) and thus ensure that the infection cycle is maintained.

Ticks ingest the infected erythrocytes when they feed. In the tick's intestine, the merozoites develop into sexual Babesia stages (gametocytes and gametes). These differentiate into kinetes, which penetrate the eggs inside the tick's ovaries and thus pass on the pathogen to the tick's offspring (transovarial transmission). This transovarial transmission means that not only adult ticks but also nymphs are carriers of Babesia. In addition, the kinetes migrate to the salivary glands of the tick, where they differentiate into sporozoites that are infectious to dogs.

== Clinical picture ==
In Germany, the acute form of Babesia canis canis infection is most common. The incubation period is 5 to 7 days, but in rare cases, it can last up to three weeks after the tick bite. Signs of the disease (symptoms) include general malaise and fever, followed by loss of appetite, weight loss, and fatigue. One to two days later, the breakdown of red blood cells (haemolysis) leads to anaemia, blood in the urine, excretion of the blood pigment breakdown product bilirubin in the urine (bilirubinuria), and, in some cases, jaundice. Liver and spleen enlargement are common. In severe cases, ascites and water retention (oedema) occur, as well as bleeding of the skin and mucous membranes due to a lack of blood platelets (thrombocytopenia) and blood clotting within the blood vessels (disseminated intravascular coagulopathy). Inflammation of the mouth (stomatitis) and stomach lining (gastritis), as well as the muscles (myositis), is common. A "central nervous system form" with epilepsy-like seizures, movement disorders, and paralysis is also possible. If left untreated, the acute form ends within a few days with death from respiratory distress, anaemia, and kidney failure, which is a feared complication of babesiosis. The rare peracute form ends fatally within one to two days without any obvious symptoms. Infection with B. canis rossi is similar to that with B. canis canis.

The severity of clinical symptoms depends on various factors. In the classic natural foci of Babesia canis canis (southern Austria, Hungary, northern Italy), young animals are generally protected by antibodies from the bitch's first milk (colostrum) due to high infection rates. They develop extensive protection through primary latency and become immune carriers. Here, the chronic or subclinical course of the disease dominates, with non-specific symptoms such as intermittent fever, loss of appetite, anaemia, and general weakness.

== Diagnostics ==
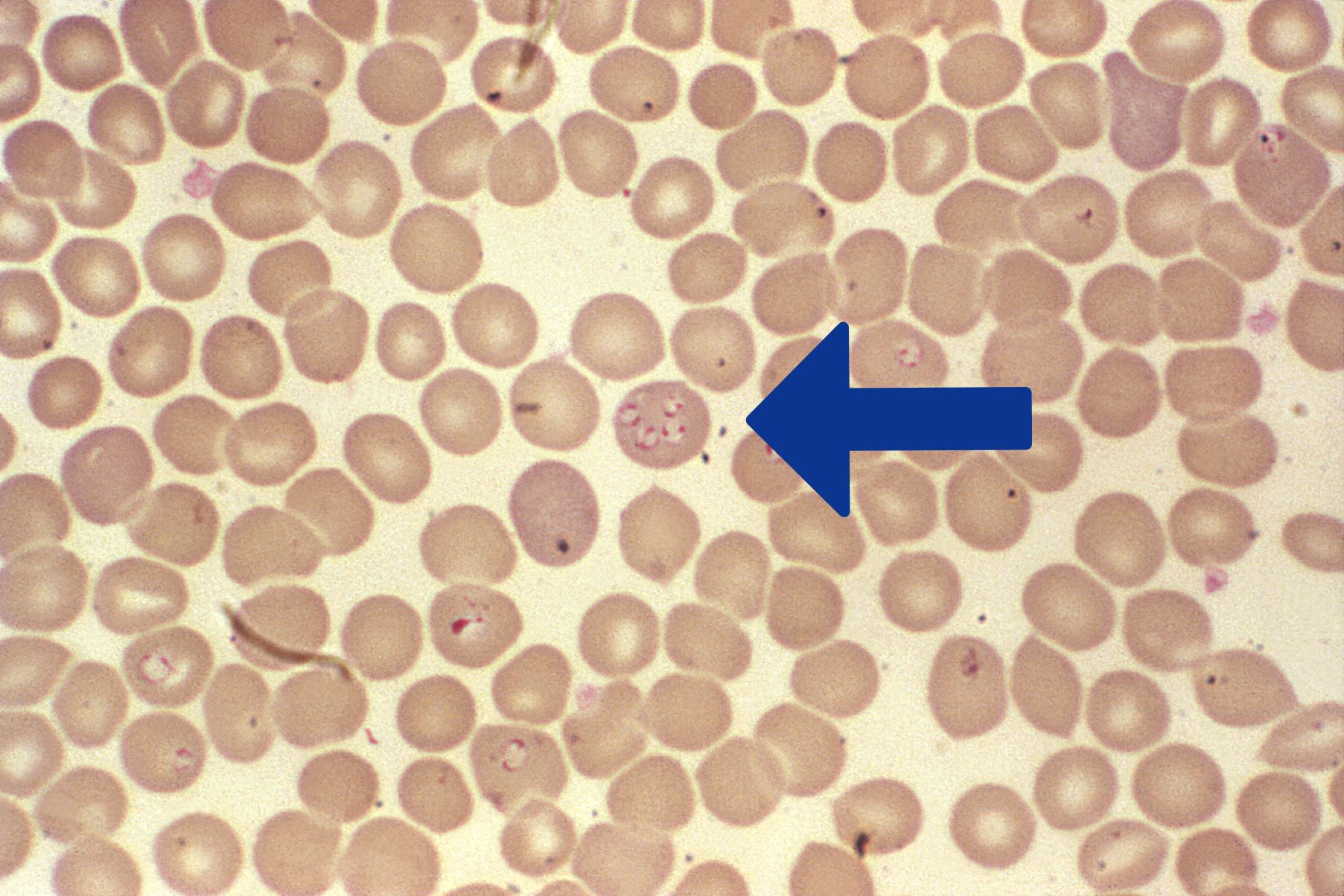
Babesia in a blood smear. The cell nuclei of the pathogens appear as bright red spots on the red blood cells in Giemsa staining.

Babesiosis can be clinically confused with a variety of other febrile illnesses. The diagnosis can be made using a normal blood smear ("thin drop") or the so-called "thick drop", whereby capillary blood is more sensitive than venous blood. In the early stages of infection and between periods of rapid reproduction in the blood (parasitaemia), the pathogens may only be present in small numbers and therefore be overlooked. Reliable detection in a blood smear is only possible around seven days after infection. Babesia can be detected under a microscope, with Giemsa staining being the most reliable method, unlike the usual rapid staining methods. B. canis appears as pear-shaped structures arranged in pairs or larger groups in a rosette pattern in the red blood cells, while B. gibsoni appears as ring-shaped structures. Reliable PCR detection of the pathogen's DNA is possible as early as 3 to 5 days after infection.

Serological tests, such as the immunofluorescence antibody test and the enzyme-linked immunosorbent assay (ELISA) are not useful in acute cases, as the animals have not yet produced any antibodies. Antibodies can be detected as early as 10 days after infection. In chronic cases, cyclical changes in antibody levels occur.

If a blood test shows a leukocyte count < 7,250/μL, a thrombocyte count < 55,000/μL, and a reticulocyte count < 61,600/μL, babesiosis should always be considered if the preliminary report indicates this, and direct detection of the pathogen should be attempted. Differential diagnoses must include, above all, anaplasmosis, immune-mediated haemolytic anaemia, immune-mediated thrombocytopenia, infection with Mycoplasma haemocanis, inflammation of the urinary tract, and poisoning with onions.

== Treatment and prevention ==
As the disease is rapidly fatal in animals not originating from endemic areas and in highly virulent Babesia species, treatment should be initiated immediately if suspected. Antiprotozoal drugs such as imidocarb or diminazene are effective against B. canis, but only slightly effective against "small Babesia". Imidocarb can also be administered once as a pro prophylactic measure when travelling to endemic areas – protection lasts for around three weeks. A combination of atovaquone and azithromycin can also cure chronic infections with B. gibsoni. This combination can also be used against B. canis if resistance to imidocarb develops or if there are recurrences. Phenamidine is also effective against "small Babesia", but is currently not available in Germany. In acute cases, a blood transfusion or the administration of haemoglobin glutamer 200 is indicated if the haematocrit is below 20. Treatment with imidocarb varies depending on the region. In the original endemic areas, it is administered once at a low dose to suppress the acute disease but not completely eliminate the pathogen, allowing the development of long-lasting immunity. In non-endemic regions, however, the active ingredient is administered twice at a higher dose. This completely eradicates the pathogen, but the resulting immunity only lasts for 1 to 2 years. There are currently no valid guidelines for treating seropositive dogs without symptoms of disease. Based on current knowledge, treatment of such dogs is not indicated if the PCR test is negative. However, treatment should be considered in animals with a removed spleen or immunosuppressed.

The most important preventative measure is to check your pet for ticks after every walk and remove them immediately. Protection against ticks using external tick-killing agents (acaricides such as deltamethrin, flumethrin, or permethrin) or oral acaricides such as fluralaner or afoxolaner is advisable, as these also reduce the risk of other diseases transmitted by ticks to dogs, such as Lyme disease, ehrlichiosis or hepatozoonosis.

A vaccine against B. c. canis and B. c. rossi (trade name Nobivac Piro) was available from 2004 onwards. Although it did not protect against infection, it significantly alleviated the disease. It had to be administered every six months after two initial immunisations. The Standing Committee on Vaccination in Veterinary Medicine did not recommend its general use. In 2012, EU approval expired at the manufacturer's request, meaning that vaccination is no longer possible.
