= Pacific Coast tick fever =

Scientific classification
- Domain: Bacteria
- Kingdom: Pseudomonadati
- Phylum: Pseudomonadota
- Class: Alphaproteobacteria
- Order: Rickettsiales
- Family: Rickettsiaceae
- Genus: Rickettsia
- Species group: Spotted fever group
- Species: R. philipii

Binomial name
- Rickettsia philipii Kato et al. 2010

Species of bacterium

Pacific Coast tick fever
- Causes: Rickettsia philipii spread by the Pacific coast tick
- Differential diagnosis: Rickettsia parkeri rickettsiosis, Rocky Mountain spotted fever, rickettsialpox

Pacific Coast tick fever is an infection caused by Rickettsia philipii. The disease is spread by the Pacific coast ticks. Signs of the illness may include an eschar. It is within a group known as spotted fever rickettsiosis together with Rickettsia parkeri rickettsiosis, Rocky Mountain spotted fever, and rickettsialpox. These infections can be difficult to tell apart.
