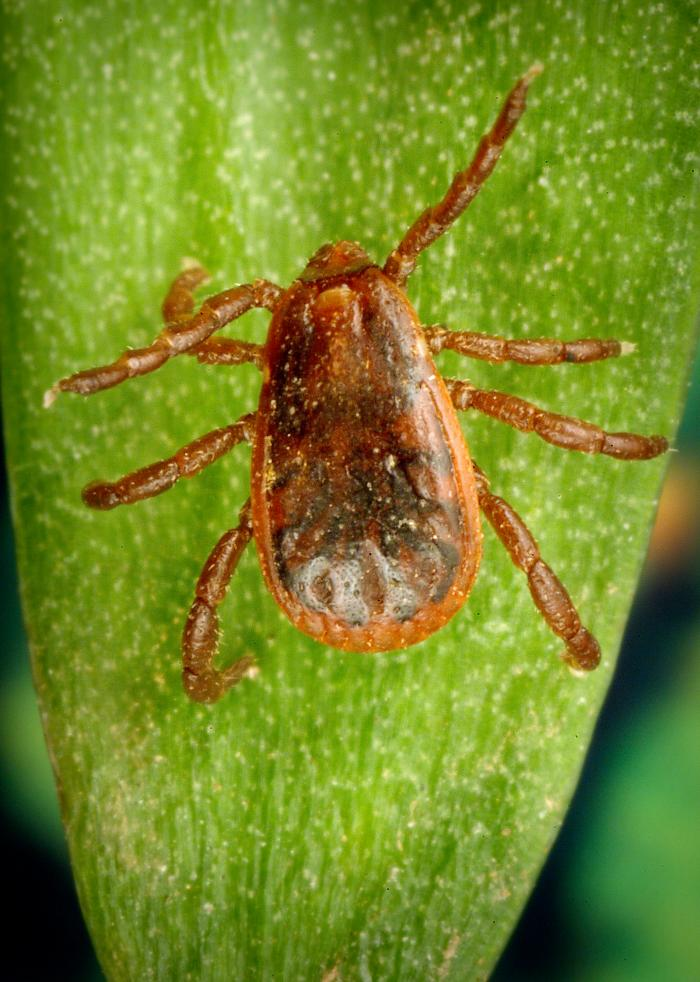

Scientific classification
- Kingdom: Animalia
- Phylum: Arthropoda
- Subphylum: Chelicerata
- Class: Arachnida
- Order: Ixodida
- Family: Ixodidae
- Genus: Rhipicephalus
- Species: R. sanguineus

Binomial name
- Rhipicephalus sanguineus (Latreille, 1806)

Synonyms
- Boophilus dugesi Dönitz, 1907; Eurhipicephalus sanguineus Stephens & Christophers, 1908; Ixodes dugesi Gervais, 1844; Ixodes hexagonus sanguineus Séguy, 1935; Ixodes linnaei Audouin, 1826; Ixodes plumbeus Dugès, 1834 (misapplied name); Ixodes sanguineus Latreille, 1806; Rhipicephalus beccarii Pavesi, 1883; Rhipicephalus bhamensis Supino, 1897 (ambiguous synonym); Rhipicephalus breviceps Warburton, 1910; Rhipicephalus brevicollis Neumann, 1897; Rhipicephalus carinatus Frauenfeld, 1867; Rhipicephalus dugesi Neumann, 1911 (misapplied name); Rhipicephalus flavus Supino, 1897 (ambiguous synonym); Rhipicephalus limbatus Koch, 1844; Rhipicephalus linnei Koch, 1844 (misapplied name); Rhipicephalus macropis Schulze, 1936; Rhipicephalus rubicundus Frauenfeld, 1867; Rhipicephalus rutilus Koch, 1844; Rhipicephalus sanguineus brevicollis Neumann, 1904; Rhipicephalus sanguineus sanguineus Neumann, 1911; Rhipicephalus siculus Koch, 1844; Rhipicephalus stigmaticus Gerstäcker, 1873; Rhipicephalus texanus Banks, 1908; Rhipicephalus (Eurhipicephalus) sanguineus Neumann, 1904; Rhipicephalus (Eurhipicephalus) sanguineus brevicollis Neumann, 1904; Rhipicephalus (Rhipicephalus) sanguineus Santos Dias, 1955; Rhipicephalus (Rhipicephalus) sanguineus sanguineus Santos Dias, 1955

= Rhipicephalus sanguineus =

Species of tick found worldwide

Rhipicephalus sanguineus, commonly called the brown dog tick, kennel tick, or pantropical dog tick, is a species of tick found worldwide, but more commonly in warmer climates. This species is unusual among ticks in that its entire lifecycle can be completed indoors. The brown dog tick is easily recognized by its reddish-brown color, elongated body shape, and hexagonal basis capituli (flat surface where mouthparts are attached). Adults are 2.28 to 3.18 mm in length and 1.11 to 1.68 mm in width. They do not have ornamentation on their backs.

== Development ==
The tick follows the normal developmental stages of egg, larva, nymph, and adult. It is called a three-host tick because it feeds on a different host during each of the larval, nymphal, and adult stages. However, the hosts tend to be of one species. Larvae feed for 5–15 days, drop from the host, and develop into nymphs after 1–2 weeks. The nymphs then attach to either the previous host or a different host and feed for 3–13 days before dropping from the host. After two weeks, they develop into adults and attach to another host where they continue to ingest blood, followed by a period of mating. The females drop yet again in order to lay their eggs, which can total up to 7,000 in number.

Rhipicephalus sanguineus can acquire bacterial or protozoal causative agents of disease at any of these life stages.

== Hosts ==
Rhipicephalus sanguineus feeds on a wide variety of mammals, but dogs are the preferred host in the U.S., and the population can reach pest proportions in houses and kennels. The preferred attachment sites on a dog are the head, ears, back, between toes, and axilla.

== Medical importance ==
Rhipicephalus sanguineus is one of the most important vectors of diseases in dogs worldwide. In the United States, R. sanguineus is a vector of many disease-causing pathogens in dogs, including Ehrlichia canis, which causes canine ehrlichiosis, and Babesia canis, which is responsible for canine babesiosis. In dogs, symptoms of canine ehrlichiosis include lameness and fever; those for babesiosis include fever, anorexia, and anemia. R. sanguineus has not been shown to transmit the bacteria that cause Lyme disease in humans. In parts of Europe, Asia, and Africa, it is a vector of Rickettsia conorii, known locally as Mediterranean spotted fever, boutonneuse fever, or tick typhus.

It can also transmit Rickettsia rickettsii, the bacteria responsible for causing Rocky Mountain spotted fever in humans in the Southwestern United States.

== Microorganisms found in R. sanguineus ==
- Babesia vogeli
- Babesia canis
- Coxiella burnetii
- Ehrlichia canis
- Hepatozoon canis
- Mycoplasma haemocanis
- Rickettsia conorii
- Rickettsia rickettsii
- Wolbachia spp.

== Management ==
The best management strategy is prevention of infestations in the house or kennel. In addition, the earlier the infestation is discovered, the easier it is to control. Regular grooming and inspection of pets is essential to management, especially when dogs have been quartered or have interacted with other dogs.

== Distribution ==
A cosmopolitan species, it can be found worldwide with the exception of the United Kingdom where Hoyle et al. 2001 and Bates et al. 2002 found it only in quarantine kennels. No further intrusion into the UK has been found as of 2010. Due to global warming the distribution is changing with autochthonous cases in Hungary, for example, emerging and increasing since 2005.

== See also ==
- Ticks of domestic animals
