= Spotted fever =

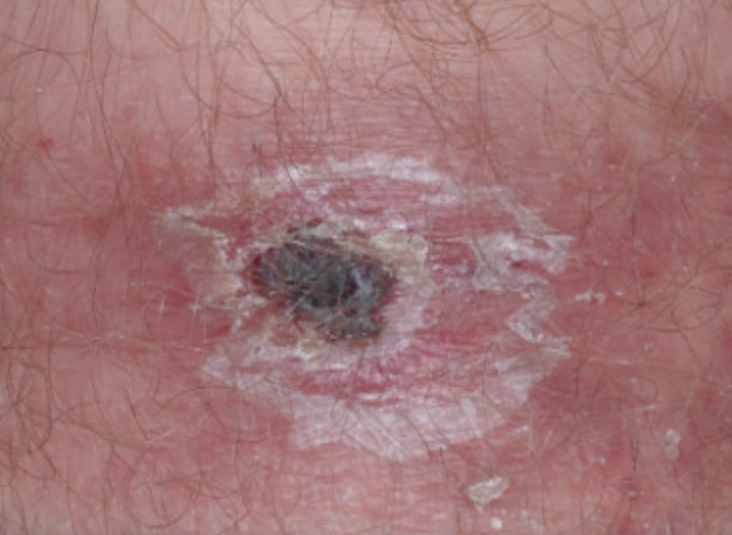
- Eschar at site of tick or mite bite
- Specialty: Infectious disease

A spotted fever (also known as spotted fever rickettsiosis) is a type of tick-borne disease which presents on the skin. Spotted fever infections include Rocky Mountain spotted fever, Rickettsia parkeri rickettsiosis, Pacific Coast tick fever, and rickettsialpox. They are all caused by bacteria of the genus Rickettsia. Typhus is a group of similar diseases also caused by Rickettsia bacteria, but spotted fevers and typhus are different clinical entities.

Transmission process: When the tick latches on, it needs to be removed within 2 hours. If not noticed or unremoved, it takes only 10 hours for the tick to transmit the (disease) to the human.

The phrase apparently originated in Spain in the 17th century and was ‘loosely applied in England to typhus or any fever involving petechial eruptions.’ During the 17th and 18th centuries, it was thought to be "cousin-germane" to and herald of the bubonic plague, a disease which periodically afflicted the city of London and its environs during the 16th and 17th centuries, most notably during the Great Plague of 1665.

Types of spotted fevers include:

- Helvetica spotted fever
- Mediterranean spotted fever
- Rocky Mountain spotted fever
- Queensland tick typhus
