= Wild cotton =

Wild cotton is a common name for several plants which may refer to:

- Wild forms of plants in the cotton genus, Gossypium
- Apocynum cannabinum, native to North America
- Asclepias syriaca, native to North America
- Ipomoea albivenia
