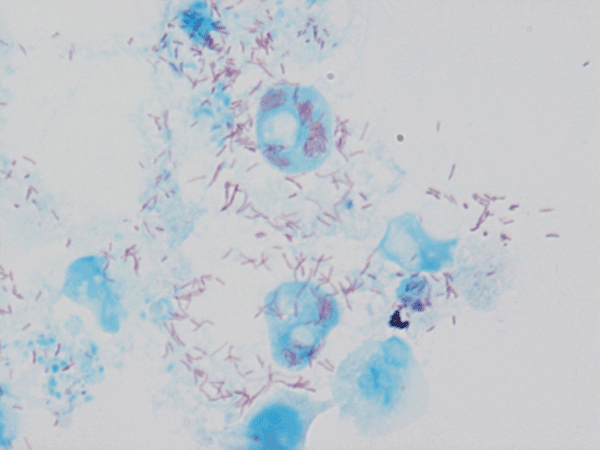
- Rickettsia conorii observed in Vero cells (red rods; magnification ×1,000)

Scientific classification
- Domain: Bacteria
- Kingdom: Pseudomonadati
- Phylum: Pseudomonadota
- Class: Alphaproteobacteria
- Subclass: "Rickettsidae"
- Order: Rickettsiales
- Family: Rickettsiaceae
- Genus: Rickettsia
- Species group: Spotted fever group
- Species: R. conorii

Binomial name
- Rickettsia conorii Brumpt 1932

= Rickettsia conorii =

Species of bacterium

Rickettsia conorii is a Gram-negative, obligate intracellular bacterium of the genus Rickettsia that causes human disease called boutonneuse fever, Mediterranean spotted fever, Israeli tick typhus, Astrakhan spotted fever, Kenya tick typhus, Indian tick typhus, or other names that designate the locality of occurrence while having distinct clinical features. It is a member of the spotted fever group and the most geographically dispersed species in the group, recognized in most of the regions bordering on the Mediterranean Sea and Black Sea, Israel, Kenya, and other parts of North, Central, and South Africa, and India. The prevailing vector is the brown dog tick, Rhipicephalus sanguineus. The bacterium was isolated by Emile Brumpt in 1932 and named after A. Conor, who in collaboration with A. Bruch, provided the first description of boutonneuse fever in Tunisia in 1910.

The genome of the bacterium has been sequenced and four subspecies have been identified.

Genomes of intracellular or parasitic bacteria undergo massive reduction compared to their free-living relatives. Examples include Rickettsia for alpha proteobacteria, Tropheryma whipplei for Actinobacteria, Mycoplasma for Firmicutes (the low G+C content Gram-positive), and Wigglesworthia and Buchnera for gamma proteobacteria.

Some of the largest virions like Megavirus chilense, Pandoravirus, Pithovirus and Mimivirus are comparable in size to miniature bacteria like Tropheryma whipplei and Rickettsia conorii.
