= Boutonneuse fever =

- Other names: Mediterranean spotted fever
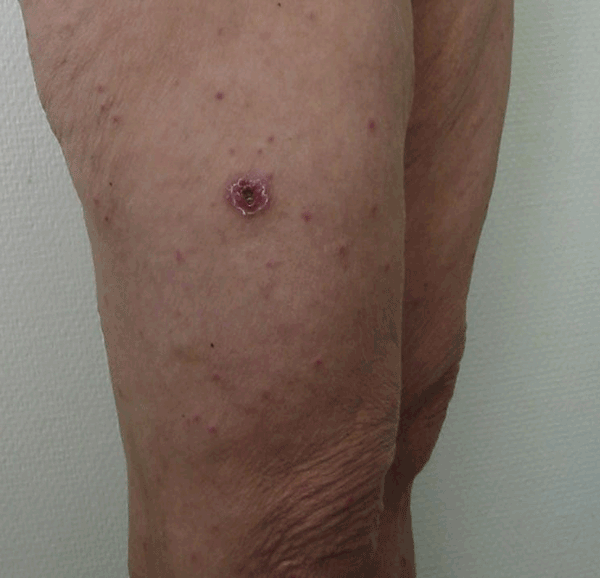
- Typical eschar and spots on the leg of a patient with Boutonneuse fever
- Specialty: Infectious disease

Boutonneuse fever (also called Mediterranean spotted fever, fièvre boutonneuse, Kenya tick typhus, Indian tick typhus, Marseilles fever, or Astrakhan fever) is a fever as a result of a rickettsial infection caused by the bacterium Rickettsia conorii and transmitted by the dog tick Rhipicephalus sanguineus. Boutonneuse fever can be seen in many places around the world, although it is endemic in countries surrounding the Mediterranean Sea. This disease was first described in Tunisia in 1910 by Conor and Bruch and was named boutonneuse (French for "spotty") due to its papular skin-rash characteristics.

== Signs and symptoms ==
After an incubation period of around seven days, the disease manifests abruptly with chills, high fevers, muscular and articular pains, severe headache, and photophobia. The location of the bite forms a black, ulcerous crust (tache noire). Around the fourth day of the illness, a widespread rash appears, first macular and then maculopapular, and sometimes petechial.

== Diagnosis ==
The diagnosis is made with serologic methods, either the classic Weil–Felix test, (agglutination of Proteus OX strains), ELISA, or immunofluorescence assays in the bioptic material of the primary lesion. The Weil–Felix test demonstrated low sensitivity (33%) in diagnosing acute rickettsial infections and low specificity, with a positive titre of 1:320 seen in 54% of healthy volunteers and 62% of non-rickettsial fever patients. Therefore, the use of the WFT should be discouraged in the diagnosis of acute rickettsial infections.

== Treatment ==
The illness can be treated with tetracyclines (doxycycline is the preferred treatment), chloramphenicol, macrolides, or fluoroquinolones.

== See also ==
- Rocky Mountain spotted fever
