= Rocky Mountain spotted fever =

Bacterial infection spread by ticks

- Other names: Blue disease, Brazilian spotted fever, Tobia fever, new world spotted fever, tick-borne typhus fever, São Paulo fever
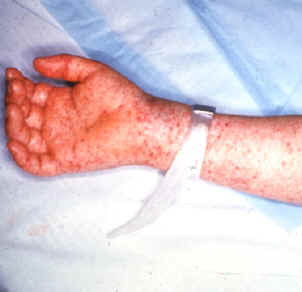
- Petechial rash on the arm caused by Rocky Mountain spotted fever
- Specialty: Infectious disease
- Symptoms: Early: Fever, headache Later: Rash
- Complications: Hearing loss, loss of limbs
- Usual onset: 2 to 14 days after infection
- Duration: 2 weeks
- Causes: Rickettsia rickettsii spread by ticks
- Diagnostic method: Based on symptoms
- Differential diagnosis: Zika fever, dengue, chikungunya, Rickettsia parkeri rickettsiosis, Pacific Coast tick fever, rickettsialpox
- Treatment: Doxycycline
- Prognosis: 0.5% risk of death
- Frequency: < 5,000 cases per year (USA)

Rocky Mountain spotted fever (RMSF) is a bacterial disease spread by ticks. It typically begins with a fever and headache, which is followed a few days later with the development of a rash. The rash is generally made up of small spots of bleeding and starts on the wrists and ankles. Other symptoms may include muscle pains and vomiting. Long-term complications following recovery may include hearing loss or loss of part of an arm or leg.

The disease is caused by Rickettsia rickettsii, a type of bacterium that is primarily spread to humans by American dog ticks, Rocky Mountain wood ticks, and brown dog ticks. Rarely the disease is spread by blood transfusions. Diagnosis in the early stages is difficult. Several laboratory tests can confirm the diagnosis but treatment should be begun based on symptoms. It is within a group known as spotted fever rickettsiosis, together with Rickettsia parkeri rickettsiosis, Pacific Coast tick fever, and rickettsialpox.

Treatment of RMSF is with the antibiotic doxycycline. It works best when started early and is recommended in all age groups, as well as during pregnancy. Antibiotics are not recommended for prevention. Approximately 0.5% of people who are infected die as a result. Before the discovery of tetracycline in the 1940s, more than 10% of those with RMSF died.

Fewer than 5,000 cases are reported annually in the United States, usually in June and July. It has been diagnosed throughout the contiguous United States, Western Canada, and parts of Central and South America. Rocky Mountain spotted fever was first identified in the 1800s in the Rocky Mountains.

== Signs and symptoms ==
Spotted fever can be challenging to diagnose in its early stages, due to the similarity of symptoms with many different diseases. People infected with R. rickettsii usually notice symptoms following an incubation period of one to two weeks after a tick bite. The early clinical presentation of Rocky Mountain spotted fever is nonspecific and may resemble a variety of other infectious and noninfectious diseases.

Initial symptoms:

- Fever
- Nausea
- Emesis (vomiting)
- Severe headache
- Muscle pain
- Malaise

Later signs and symptoms:

- Maculopapular rash
- Petechial rash
- Abdominal pain
- Joint pain
- Conjunctivitis
- Forgetfulness

The classic triad of findings for this disease is fever, rash, and a history of a tick bite. However, this combination is often not identified when patients initially present for care. The rash has a centripetal, or "inward" pattern of spread, meaning it begins at the distal extremities, like ankles and wrists, and courses towards the trunk.

=== Rash ===
The rash first appears two to five days after the onset of fever, and it is often quite subtle. Younger patients usually develop the rash earlier than older patients. Most often, the rash begins as small, flat, pink, non-itchy spots (macules) on the wrists, forearms, and ankles. These spots turn pale when pressure is applied and eventually become raised on the skin. The characteristic red, spotted (petechial) rash of Rocky Mountain spotted fever is usually not seen until the sixth day or later after the onset of symptoms. This type of rash occurs in only 35-60% of patients with Rocky Mountain spotted fever. The rash involves the palms or soles in as many as 80% of people. However, this distribution may not occur until later on in the course of the disease. As many as 15% of patients may never develop a rash.

=== Complications ===
People can develop permanent disabilities including "cognitive deficits, ataxia, hemiparesis, blindness, deafness, or amputation following gangrene".

== Cause ==
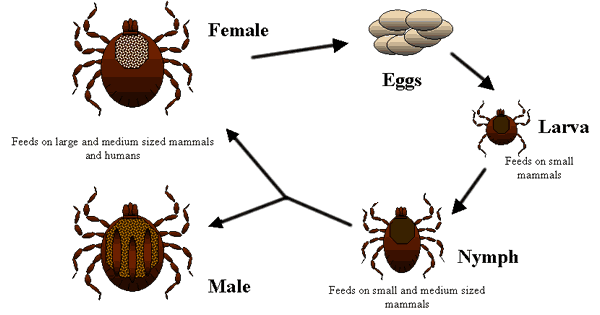
The lifecycle of Dermacentor variabilis and Dermacentor andersoni ticks (family Ixodidae)

American dog tick (Dermacentor variabilis). Established range in red; reported but not confirmed in blue area.

Rocky Mountain wood tick (Dermacentor andersoni) range

Ticks are the natural hosts of the disease, serving as both reservoirs and vectors of R. rickettsii. Ticks transmit the bacteria primarily through their bites. Less commonly, infections may occur following exposure to crushed tick tissues, fluids, or tick feces.

A female tick can transmit R. rickettsii to her eggs in a process called transovarial transmission. Ticks can also become infected with R. rickettsii while feeding on blood from the host in either the larval or nymphal stage. After the tick develops into the next stage, the R. rickettsii may be transmitted to the second host during the feeding process. Furthermore, male ticks may transfer R. rickettsii to female ticks through body fluids or spermatozoa during the mating process. These types of transmission represent how generations or life stages of infected ticks are maintained. Once infected, the tick can carry the pathogen for life.

Rickettsiae are transmitted through saliva injected while a tick is feeding. Unlike Lyme disease and other tick-borne pathogens that require a prolonged attachment period to establish infection, a person can become infected with R. rickettsii in a feeding time as short as 2 hours. In general, about 1-3% of the tick population carries R. rickettsii, even in areas where the majority of human cases are reported. Therefore, the risk of exposure to a tick carrying R. rickettsii is low.

The disease is spread by the American dog tick (Dermacentor variabilis), Rocky Mountain wood tick (D. andersoni), brown dog tick (Rhipicephalus sanguineus), and Amblyomma sculptum. Not all of these are of equal importance, and most are restricted to certain geographic areas.

The two major vectors of R. rickettsii in the United States are the American dog tick and the Rocky Mountain wood tick. American dog ticks are widely distributed east of the Rocky Mountains, and they also occur in limited areas along the Pacific Coast. Dogs and medium-sized mammals are the preferred hosts of an adult American dog tick, although it feeds readily on other large mammals, including human beings. This tick is the most commonly identified species responsible for transmitting R. rickettsii to humans. Rocky Mountain wood ticks (D. andersoni) are found in the Rocky Mountain states and southwestern Canada. The lifecycle of this tick takes up to three years to complete. Adult ticks feed primarily on large mammals. The larvae and nymphs feed on small rodents.

Other tick species are naturally infected with R. rickettsii or serve as experimental vectors in the laboratory. These species are likely to play only a minor role in the ecology of R. rickettsii.

== Pathophysiology ==
=== Entry into host ===
Rickettsia rickettsii can be transmitted to human hosts through the bite of an infected tick. As with other bacteria transmitted via ticks, the process generally requires a period of attachment of 4 to 6 hours. However, in some cases, a Rickettsia rickettsii infection was contracted by contact with tick tissues or fluids. Then, the bacteria induce their internalization into host cells via a receptor-mediated invasion mechanism.

Researchers believe that this mechanism is similar to that of Rickettsia conorii. This species of Rickettsia uses an abundant cell surface protein called OmpB to attach to a host cell membrane protein called Ku70. It has previously been reported that Ku70 migrates to the host cell surface in the presence of "Rickettsia". Then, Ku70 is ubiquitinated by c-Cbl, an E3 ubiquitin ligase. This triggers a cascade of signal transduction events resulting in the recruitment of Arp2/3 complex. CDC42, protein tyrosine kinase, phosphoinositide 3-kinase, and Src-family kinases then activate Arp2/3. This causes the alteration of local host cytoskeletal actin at the entry site as part of a zipper mechanism. Then, the bacteria is phagocytosized by the host cell and enveloped by a phagosome.

Studies have suggested that rOmpB is involved in this process of adhesion and invasion. Both rOmpA and rOmpB are members of a family of surface cell antigens (Sca) which are autotransporter proteins; they act as ligands for the Omp proteins and are found throughout the rickettsiae.

=== Exit from host cell ===
The cytosol of the host cell contains nutrients, adenosine triphosphate, amino acids, and nucleotides, which are used by the bacteria for growth. For this reason, as well as to avoid phagolysosomal fusion and death, rickettsiae must escape from the phagosome. To escape from the phagosome, the bacteria secrete phospholipase D and hemolysin C. This disrupts the phagosomal membrane and allows the bacteria to escape. Following generation time in the cytoplasm of the host cells, the bacteria utilize actin-based motility to move through the cytosol.

RickA, expressed on the rickettsial surface, activates Arp2/3 and causes actin polymerization. The rickettsiae use the actin to propel themselves throughout the cytosol to the surface of the host cell. This causes the host cell membrane to protrude outward and invaginate the membrane of an adjacent cell. The bacteria are then taken up by the neighboring cell in a double membrane vacuole that the bacteria can subsequently lyse, enabling spread from cell to cell without exposure to the extracellular environment.

=== Consequences of infection ===
Rickettsia rickettsii initially infects blood vessel endothelial cells, but eventually migrates to vital organs, such as the brain, skin, and the heart, via the bloodstream. Bacterial replication in host cells causes endothelial cell proliferation and inflammation, resulting in mononuclear cell infiltration into blood vessels and subsequent red blood cell leakage into surrounding tissues. The characteristic rash observed in Rocky Mountain spotted fever is the direct result of this localized replication of Rickettsia in blood vessel endothelial cells.

== Diagnosis ==
This disease can be diagnosed by a doctor with or without the use of lab testing. Lab tests are not always relied upon because treatment may be necessary before the results are returned.

Abnormal laboratory findings seen in patients with Rocky Mountain spotted fever may include a low platelet count, low blood sodium concentration, or elevated liver enzyme levels. Serology testing and skin biopsy are considered to be the best methods of diagnosis. Although immunofluorescent antibody assays are considered some of the best serology tests available, most antibodies that fight against R. rickettsii are undetectable on serology tests during the first seven days after infection.

Differential diagnosis includes dengue, leptospirosis, chikungunya, and Zika fever.

== Treatment ==
Appropriate antibiotic treatment should be started immediately when there is a suspicion of Rocky Mountain spotted fever. Treatment should not be delayed for laboratory confirmation of disease, as early initiation of treatment of Rocky Mountain spotted fever is associated with lower mortality. Failure to respond to a tetracycline argues against a diagnosis of Rocky Mountain spotted fever. Severely ill people may require longer periods before their fever resolves, especially if they have experienced damage to multiple organ systems. Preventive therapy in healthy people who have had recent tick bites is not recommended and may only delay the onset of disease.

Doxycycline (a tetracycline) is the drug of choice for patients with Rocky Mountain spotted fever. According to the CDC, "Doctors often avoid prescribing doxycycline to young children because of a warning that tooth staining may occur when used in children less than 8 years old. Misperceptions about the use of doxycycline for children prevent kids from getting lifesaving treatment" of rickettsial diseases. "Delay in treatment of rickettsial diseases may lead to severe illness or death. Children are five times more likely than adults to die from RMSF." A 2013 study shows that "short courses of…doxycycline can be used in children without causing tooth staining or weakening of tooth enamel." The CDC observed that "clearer language on the drug label may help avoid hesitation in prescribing life-saving doxycycline to children."

Treatment typically consists of 100 milligrams every 12 hours, or for children under 45 kg (99 lb) at 4 mg/kg of body weight per day in two divided doses. Treatment should be continued for at least three days after the fever subsides, and until there is unequivocal evidence of clinical improvement. This will be generally for a minimum time of five to ten days. Severe or complicated outbreaks may require longer treatment courses. Chloramphenicol is an alternative drug that can be used to treat Rocky Mountain spotted fever, specifically in pregnancy. However, this drug may be associated with a wide range of side effects, and careful monitoring of blood levels is required.

== Prognosis ==
Rocky Mountain spotted fever can be a very severe illness, and patients often require hospitalization. Because R. rickettsii infects the cells lining blood vessels throughout the body, severe manifestations of this disease may involve the respiratory system, central nervous system, gastrointestinal system, or kidneys. Long-term health problems following acute Rocky Mountain spotted fever infection include partial paralysis of the lower extremities, gangrene requiring amputation of fingers, toes, or arms or legs, hearing loss, loss of bowel or bladder control, movement disorders, and language disorders. These complications are most frequent in persons recovering from severe, life-threatening disease, often following lengthy hospitalizations.

== Epidemiology ==
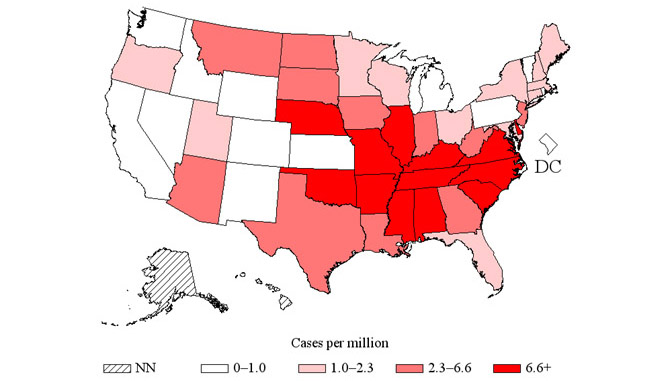
US distribution of spotted fever rickettsiosis, of which RMSF is a type, in 2014

There are between 500 and 2500 cases of Rocky Mountain spotted fever reported in the United States per year, and in only about 20% can the tick be found.

Host factors associated with severe or fatal Rocky Mountain spotted fever include advanced age, male sex, African or Caribbean background, long-term excessive alcohol use, and glucose-6-phosphate dehydrogenase (G6PD) deficiency. Deficiency of G6PD is a genetic condition affecting about 12 percent of the African-American male population. Deficiency in this enzyme is associated with a high proportion of severe cases of Rocky Mountain spotted fever. This is a rare clinical complication that is often fatal within five days of the onset of the disease.

In the early 1940s, outbreaks were described in the Mexican states of Sinaloa, Sonora, Durango, and Coahuila driven by dogs and Rhipicephalus sanguineus sensu lato, the brown dog tick. Over the ensuing 100 years, case fatality rates were 30%–80%. In 2015, there was an abrupt rise in Sonora cases, with 80 fatal cases. From 2003 to 2016, cases increased to 1394 with 247 deaths.

== History ==
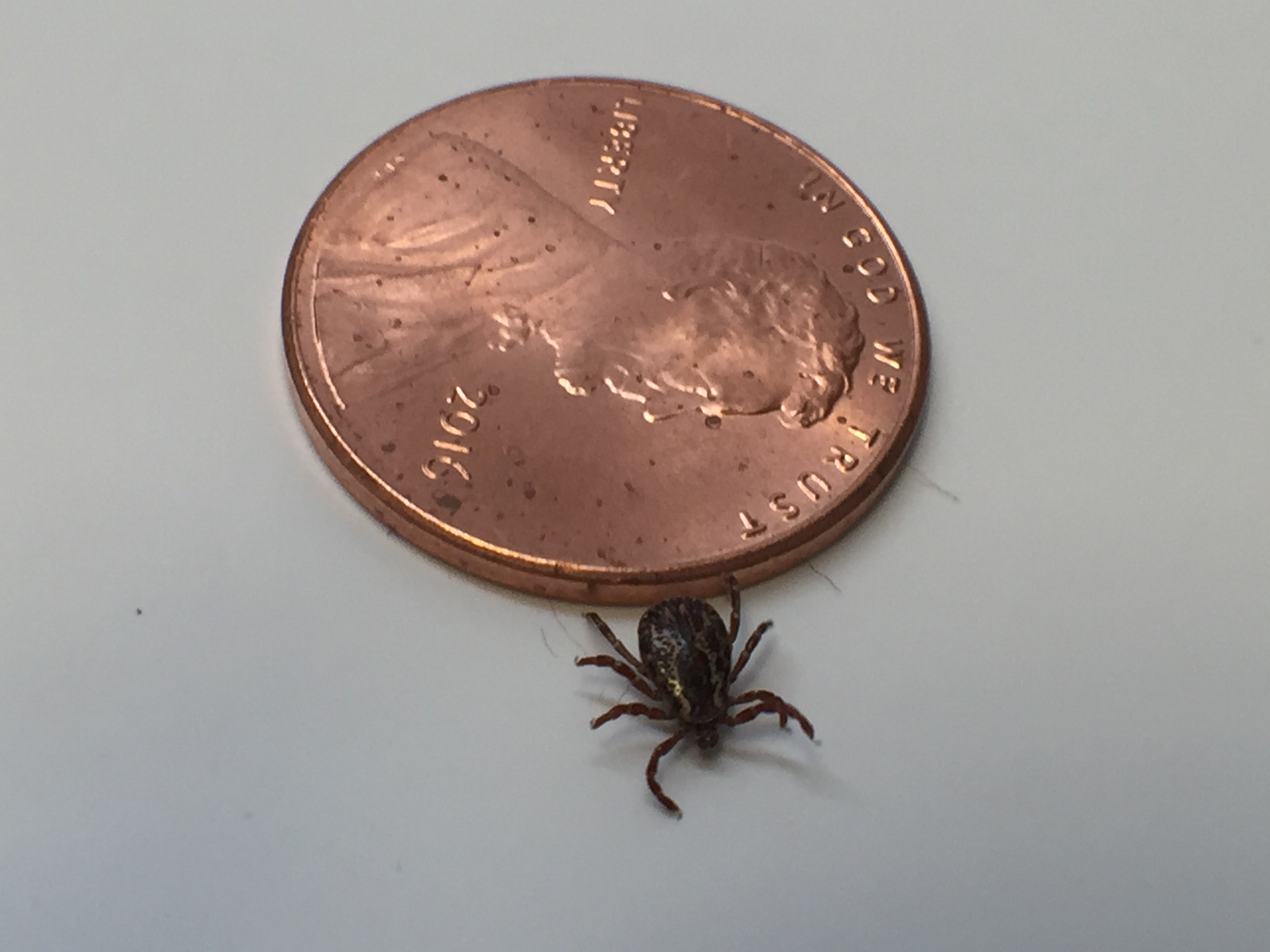
"Dog ticks" or ticks that can carry Rocky Mountain Spotted Fever are very small (smaller than a penny), making them hard for most people to detect

Rocky Mountain spotted fever (or "black measles" because of its characteristic rash) was recognized in the early 1800s, and in the last 10 years of the 1800s (1890–1900), it became very common, especially in the Bitterroot Valley of Montana. The disease was originally noted to be concentrated on the west side of the Bitterroot River. Though it would be decades before scientists discovered the tick as the carrier of the disease, in as early as 1866, Dr. John B. Buker (establishing a practice in Missoula, MT) noticed a tick embedded in the skin of one of his patients. His notes were later studied as part of later research.

In 1901, Dr. A. F. Longeway was appointed to solve "the black measles problem" in Montana. He, in turn, enlisted his friend Dr. Earl Strain to help him. Strain suspected that the illness was from ticks. In 1906, Howard T. Ricketts, a pathologist recruited from the University of Chicago, was the first to establish the identity of the infectious organism (the organism smaller than a bacterium and larger than a virus) that causes this disease. He and others characterized the basic epidemiological features of the disease, including the role of tick vectors. Their studies found that Rocky Mountain spotted fever is caused by Rickettsia rickettsii, named in Ricketts's honor. Ricketts died of typhus (another rickettsial disease) in Mexico in 1910, shortly after completing his studies on Rocky Mountain spotted fever.

On March 18, 1918, a laboratory assistant of Hideyo Noguchi at the Rockefeller Institute, Steve, fell ill, and died of Rocky Mountain Spotted Fever a week later after attempting to create serum for active and passive immunity.

Prior to 1922, Doctors McCray and McClintic both died while researching Rocky Mountain spotted fever.

Research began in 1922 in western Montana, in the Bitterroot Valley around Hamilton, Montana, after the Governor's daughter and his son-in-law died of the fever. However, before that, in 1917, Dr. Lumford Fricks introduced herds of sheep into the Bitterroot Valley. He hypothesized that the sheep would eat the tall grasses where ticks lived and bred. Past Assistant Surgeon R.R. Spencer of the Hygienic Laboratory of the U.S. Public Health Service was ordered to the region, and he led a research team at an abandoned schoolhouse through about 1924. Spencer was assisted by R. R. Parker, Bill Gettinger, Henry Cowan, Henry Greenup, Elmer Greenup, Gene Hughes, Salsbury, Kerlee, and others, of whom Gettinger, Cowan and Kerlee died of Rocky Mountain spotted fever. Through a series of discoveries, the team found that a previous blood meal was necessary to make the tick deadly to its hosts, as well as other facets of the disease.

On April 6, 1923, Hideyo Noguchi produced the first antiserum to treat the disease that was given to treat Mable Martin Sain in Missoula, Montana after contracting it at five years old, who subsequently survived. He found his after using a mixtures of spotted fever virus and immune rabbit serum to confer complete immunity on guinea pigs.

On May 19, 1924, Spencer put a large dose of mashed wood ticks, from lot 2351B, and some weak carbolic acid into his arm by injection. This vaccine worked, and for some years after it was used by people in that region to convert the illness from one with high fatality rate (albeit low incidence) to one that could be either prevented entirely (for many of them) or modified to a non-deadly form (for the rest). Today there is no commercially available vaccine for RMSF because, unlike in the 1920s when Spencer and colleagues developed one, antibiotics are now available to treat the disease, so prevention by vaccination is no longer the sole defense against likely death.

Much of the early research was conducted at Rocky Mountain Laboratories, a part of the National Institute of Allergy and Infectious Diseases. The schoolhouse laboratory of 1922–1924, filled with ticks in various phases of the life cycle, is identified in retrospect as a biohazard, although the team did not fully appreciate it at first. The deaths of Gettinger and Cowan, and the near death of the janitor's son, were the results of inadequate biocontainment, but in the 1920s, the elaborate biocontainment systems of today had not been invented.

== Popular culture ==
In the 1936 film His Brother's Wife, Robert Taylor plays a doctor who is part of a team frustrated by their inability to find RMSF in ticks collected from plants in the jungle, while infected people die all around them. When they finally test ticks from infected goats, they find their source and save a colleague's life.

Research into this disease in Montana is a sub-plot of the 1937 film Green Light, starring Errol Flynn. Some of the researchers who perished are mentioned by name, and their photographs are shown.

Rocky Mountain spotted fever is a big part of the 1947 Republic Pictures movie Driftwood, starring Walter Brennan, James Bell, Dean Jagger, Natalie Wood, and Hobart Cavanaugh.

In December 2013, hockey player Shane Doan was diagnosed with Rocky Mountain spotted fever, and returned to play in January 2014.

== Other names ==
Some synonyms for Rocky Mountain spotted fever in other countries include "tick typhus", "Tobia fever" (Colombia), "São Paulo fever" or "febre maculosa" (Brazil), and "fiebre manchada" (Mexico).
