= Weigert =

Weigert may refer to:

== People ==
- Bruce Weigert Paltrow (1943–2002), American television and film director and producer
- Fritz Weigert (1876–1947), German physical chemist
- Hermann Weigert (1890–1955), German vocal coach, pianist, and conductor
- Karl Weigert (1845–1904), German Jewish pathologist
- Marc Weigert (born 1970), film producer
- Robin Weigert, American television and film actress

== Other ==
- Weigert's elastic stain, combination of stains used in histology
- Weigert–Meyer law, a concept in urology and radiology

== See also ==
- Weichert (disambiguation)
