= Ernst Gottlob Orthmann =

German gynecologist

Ernst Gottlob Orthmann (19 March 1859, in Mettmann – 18 August 1922, in Berlin) was a German gynecologist.

== Early life and career ==
He studied medicine at the universities of Berlin, Tübingen and Göttingen, receiving his doctorate in 1882. After graduation, he worked at the University of Marburg as an assistant under surgeon Wilhelm Roser and pathologist Felix Jacob Marchand. Later on, he worked at the city hospital in Wiesbaden and at August Eduard Martin's private gynecological clinic in Berlin. In 1899 he took charge of the private clinic in Berlin when Martin was chosen as a professor at the University of Greifswald.

In 1899 he published two papers on a certain type of ovarian tumor that would later become known as a "Brenner tumour". In 1932 pathologist Robert Meyer coined the term in honor of Fritz Brenner, who described the tumor in a 1907 article titled Das Oophoroma folliculare.

== Selected works ==
- Primärkarzinom in einer Tuberkulösen, 1888.
- Leitfaden für den gynäkologischen Operationskurs, 1899.
- Vademecum für histopathologische Untersuchungen in der Gynäkologie, 1901.
- Orthmann's handbook of gynaecological pathology for practitioners and students (published in English, 1904).
