= Magic bullet =

Magic bullet may refer to:

- Enchanted bullet obtained through a contract with the devil in the German folk legend Freischütz
  - Der Freischütz, an opera by Carl Maria von Weber based on the legend
- Magic bullet (medicine), the pharmacological ideal of a drug able to selectively target a disease without other effects on the body, originally defined by Paul Ehrlich as a drug for antibacterial therapy
  - Dr. Ehrlich's Magic Bullet, a 1940 Hollywood biopic about syphilis researcher Paul Ehrlich, starring Edward G. Robinson
- "Magic Bullet Theory", the name commonly assigned to the single-bullet theory by its critics in the investigation of the John F. Kennedy assassination
- Hypodermic needle model or magic bullet theory, a model of communications in media theory
- Magic Bullet (appliance), a compact blender manufactured by Homeland Housewares
- "The Magic Bullet" (Angel), episode 19 of season 4 of television series Angel
- Magic Bullet Productions, an audio-production company
- Bullet catch, an illusion in which someone appears to catch a fired bullet
- Magic Bullet Records, an American record label
- "The Magic Bullet" (The Lincoln Lawyer), episode 2 of season 1 of television series The Lincoln Lawyer

== See also ==
- Silver bullet
