= Dr. Ehrlich's Magic Bullet =

1940 film by William Dieterle

- 1940 Theatrical Poster
- Directed by: William Dieterle
- Screenplay by: John Huston; Heinz Herald; Norman Burnstine
- Story by: Norman Burnstine
- Produced by: Hal B. Wallis; Jack L. Warner
- Starring: Edward G. Robinson; Ruth Gordon; Otto Kruger; Donald Crisp
- Cinematography: James Wong Howe
- Edited by: Warren Low
- Music by: Max Steiner
- Distributed by: Warner Bros. Pictures
- Release date: February 23, 1940
- Running time: 103 minutes
- Country: United States
- Language: English

Dr. Ehrlich's Magic Bullet also titled onscreen in many prints as Magic Bullets is a 1940 American biographical film starring Edward G. Robinson and directed by William Dieterle, based on the true story of the German doctor and scientist Dr. Paul Ehrlich. The film was released by Warner Bros., with some controversy over raising the subject of syphilis in a major studio release. It was nominated for an Academy Award for Best Original Screenplay (by Norman Burnstine, Heinz Herald and John Huston), but lost to The Great McGinty.

== Plot ==
Magic Bullets, an abridged version of Dr. Ehrlich's Magic Bullet, was created for educational campaigns of the United States Public Health Service

Paul Ehrlich is a physician working in a German hospital. He is dismissed for his constant disregard for hospital rules, which are bound by bureaucratic red tape. The reason for his conflict is his steadily rising interest in research for selective color staining, the marking of cells and microorganisms using certain dyes and marking agents which have a certain 'affinity' for their target and nothing else. Emil von Behring, whom Dr. Ehrlich meets and befriends while experimenting with his staining techniques, is impressed with Dr. Ehrlich's staining methods and refers to it as 'specific staining,' adding that this optical microscopy diagnostic technique is one of the greatest achievements in science.

After attending a medical presentation of the eminent Dr. Robert Koch demonstrating that tuberculosis is a bacterial disease, Ehrlich is able to obtain a sample of the isolated bacterium. After an intense time of research and experimentation in his own lab, paired with a portion of luck and thanks to the empathy of his wife Hedwig, he is able to develop a viable staining process for the microbe. This result is honored by Koch and medical circles as another highly valuable contribution to diagnostics.

During his work Dr. Ehrlich is infected with tuberculosis, then an often-deadly, incurable disease. To recover, Ehrlich travels with Hedwig to the hot dry climate of Egypt. There he starts to discover the properties of immunity. This discovery helps Ehrlich and colleague Dr. von Behring to fight a diphtheria epidemic that is killing off many children in the country. The two doctors are rewarded for their efforts.

Ehrlich concentrates on work to create "magic bullets" - chemicals injected into the blood to fight various diseases, thus pioneering antibiotic chemotherapy for infectious diseases. Ehrlich's laboratory has the help of a number of scientists like Sahachiro Hata. The medical board, headed by Dr. Hans Wolfert, believes much of Ehrlich's work is a waste of money and resources and fight for a reduction, just as Ehrlich begins to work on a cure for syphilis. Ehrlich is financially backed by the widow of Jewish banker Georg Speyer, Franziska Speyer, and after 606 tries he finally discovers the remedy for the disease. This substance, first called "606", then Salvarsan, is now known as Arsphenamine.

The joy of discovery is short-lived, as 38 patients who receive the treatment die. Dr. Wolfert denounces the cure publicly and accuses Ehrlich of murdering those who died from the cure. As faith in the new cure starts to dwindle, Ehrlich is forced to sue Wolfert for libel and in the process exonerate 606. Dr. von Behring (who had earlier told Ehrlich to give up his pipe dreams of cures by chemicals), is called by the defense to denounce 606. Behring instead states that he believes that 606 is responsible for a 39th death: the death of syphilis itself. Ehrlich is exonerated, but the strain and stress from the trial are too much for his weakened body and he dies shortly thereafter, his final words being counsel to his assistants and colleagues on the risks involved in advancing medicine.

== Cast ==
- Edward G. Robinson as Dr. Paul Ehrlich
- Ruth Gordon as Hedwig Ehrlich
- Otto Kruger as Dr. Emil von Behring
- Donald Crisp as Minister Althoff
- Maria Ouspenskaya as Franziska Speyer
- Montagu Love as Professor Hartman
- Sig Ruman as Dr. Hans Wolfert
- Donald Meek as Mittelmeyer
- Henry O'Neill as Dr. Lentz
- Albert Bassermann as Dr. Robert Koch
- Edward Norris as Dr. Morgenroth
- Harry Davenport as Judge
- Louis Calhern as Dr. Brockdorf
- Louis Jean Heydt as Dr. Kunze
- Charles Halton as Sensenbrenner
- Irving Bacon as Becker
- Douglas Wood as Speidler
- Frank Mayo as Assistant (uncredited)
- Frank Reicher as Old Man (uncredited)
- Wilhelm Von Brincken as Officer (uncredited)
- Ludwig Hardt as Court Clerk (uncredited)

== Production ==
Warner Bros. Pictures was concerned about Dr. Ehrlich's Magic Bullet because it was about a venereal disease, syphilis, and because Dr. Paul Ehrlich was Jewish. This was before the U.S. entry into the Second World War. Warner Bros. did not want the movie to be political or seem to have a Jewish agenda since Germany was still a market for American films. However, Warner Bros. had already produced a series of medical biographical films during the 1930s, including the William Dieterle-directed The Story of Louis Pasteur (1935) starring Paul Muni as Louis Pasteur and The White Angel (1936) about Florence Nightingale (Kay Francis). In addition, U.S. Surgeon General Thomas Parran Jr. had in late 1936 begun a syphilis control campaign to get the public to consider it to be a medical condition and not a moral failure, suggesting that a film on Ehrlich' life would be acceptable.

Ehrlich was one of the greatest Jewish doctors, and in 1908 his work on immunity won a Nobel Prize. However, the Nazi regime in Germany had systematically expunged all memory of Ehrlich from public buildings and street signs and censored books referring to him. The Second World War had already begun but the United States was not yet directly involved. Jack Warner, like other Hollywood moguls, was wary of criticism of pursuing any supposedly "Jewish" agenda on the screen. A memorandum circulated by the studio bosses stated with regard to the forthcoming Ehrlich movie: "It would be a mistake to make a political propaganda picture out of a biography which could stand on its own feet." So the words "Jew" and "Jewish" went entirely unmentioned in the film. Anti-Semitism in Ehrlich's life was no more than hinted at, and then only once or twice. In addition, the original version of the deathbed scene was changed so that Ehrlich no longer would refer to the Pentateuch (books of Moses in the Bible). Nevertheless, the film's story writer Norman Burnside declared "There isn't a man or woman alive who isn't afraid of syphilis, and let them know that a little kike named Ehrlich tamed the scourge. And maybe they can persuade their hoodlum friends to keep their fists off Ehrlich's coreligionists."

One prohibited topic of the Motion Picture Production Code adopted in 1930 was "sex hygiene and venereal diseases" and after 1934 studios were required to submit films to the Production Code Administration for approval. Aware of the restrictions of the Code, Warner executives seriously considered not mentioning the word "syphilis" in the movie. However, Hal B. Wallis, Warner Bros. head of production, while advising caution, wrote to the PCA that "to make a dramatic picture of the life of Dr. Ehrlich and not include this discovery [the anti-syphilis drug Salvarsan] among his great achievements would be unfair to the record." Following negotiations, the film received approval under the Production Code provided no scenes showing treatment of patients with syphilis were shown, and advertising of the film could not mention syphilis.

The movie's title role star Edward G. Robinson, himself Jewish, was keenly aware of the increasingly desperate situation of the Jews in Germany and Europe, and anxious for the opportunity to break out of the police and gangster roles in which he was in danger of being forever stereotyped. He met with Paul Ehrlich's daughter who had fled to the US and he corresponded with Ehrlich's widow Hedwig, who was a refugee in Switzerland. "During the filming," Robinson later recalled with regard to his role as Ehrlich: "I kept to myself, studied the script, practiced gestures before the mirror, read about his life and times, studied pictures of the man, tried to put myself in his mental state, tried to be him."

== Reception ==
The film's script, written by Norman Burnstine, Heinz Herald and John Huston, was nominated for the first ever Academy Award for Best Original Screenplay but lost to The Great McGinty at the 13th Academy Awards.

== See also ==
- List of American films of 1940
- Tuberculosis (TB)
- Diphtheria
- Side-chain theory
- Syphilis
