= Ernst Schwalbe =

Ernst Theodor Karl Schwalbe (26 January 1871 – 16 March 1920) was a German pathologist, who specialized in teratological research.

Schwalbe was born in Berlin. He studied medicine at the universities of Strassburg, Berlin and Heidelberg, and received his habilitation in 1900 with a thesis on blood coagulation. Afterwards, he worked as an assistant under Julius Arnold at Heidelberg, and in 1907/08 served as prosector and head of the pathology-bacteriology clinic at the city hospital in Karlsruhe. From 1908 to 1920 he was a full professor at the University of Rostock. He was killed in Rostock while serving as a volunteer during the Kapp Putsch (1920).

== Selected works ==
- Untersuchungen zur Blutgerinnung : Beiträge zur Chemie und Morphologie der Coagulation des Blutes, 1900 – Studies on blood coagulation: Contributions to the chemistry and morphology of coagulation of the blood.
- Vorlesungen über der Geschichte der Medizin, 1905 – Lectures on the history of medicine.
- Die Morphologie der Missbildungen des Menschen und der Tiere (3 volumes 1906–13) – Morphology of malformations of humans and animals:
  - I. Allgemeine Missbildungslehre (Teratologie) – General teratology.
  - II. Die Doppelbildungen – Double formations.
  - III. Die Einzelmissbildungen – Single malformations.
- Untersuchungen über künstliche Parthenogenese und das Wesen des Befruchtungsvorgangs, 1906 – Studies on artificial parthenogenesis and the nature of the fertilization process.
- Kleinlebewesen und Krankheiten; sechs volkswissenschaftliche Vorträge über Bakteriologie und Hygiene, 1908 – Microbes and diseases: Six scientific lectures on bacteriology and hygiene.
- Studien zur Pathologie der Entwicklung (with Robert Meyer; 2 volumes 1914–20) – Studies on the pathology of development.
