= Fritz Brenner =

German physician and pathologist

Fritz Brenner (16 December 1877, in Osthofen – 26 December 1969, in Johannesburg) was a German physician and pathologist.

He studied medicine at the universities of Strasbourg, Freiburg and Heidelberg, receiving his doctorate at the latter institution in 1904. Following graduation, he worked as an assistant under Eugen Albrecht at the Senckenberg Institute of Pathology in Frankfurt am Main. In 1910 he relocated to German South-West Africa, where he worked as a doctor at the seaport of Swakopmund. Later on, he was a physician in Windhoek (from 1922) and Johannesburg (from 1935).

In 1907 he described a unique ovarian tumour in an article titled Das Oophoroma folliculare, published in the journal Frankfurter Zeitschrift für Pathologie. In 1932 Berlin pathologist Robert Meyer (1864–1947) coined the term "Brenner tumour" in honor of his findings. Incredibly, it wasn't until the 1950s that Brenner became aware of the honor.
