= Brenner tumour =

Brenner tumor
- A Brenner tumor of ovary (gross image).
- Specialty: Gynaecology, oncology

Brenner tumours are an uncommon subtype of the surface epithelial-stromal tumour group of ovarian neoplasms. The majority are benign, but some can be malignant.

They are most frequently found incidentally on pelvic examination or at laparotomy. Brenner tumours very rarely can occur in other locations, including the testes.

== Presentation ==
On gross pathological examination, they are solid, sharply circumscribed and pale yellow-tan in colour. 90% are unilateral (arising in one ovary, the other is unaffected). The tumours can vary in size from less than 1 centimetre (0.39 in) to 30 centimetres (12 in). Borderline and malignant Brenner tumours are possible but each are rare.

== Diagnosis ==
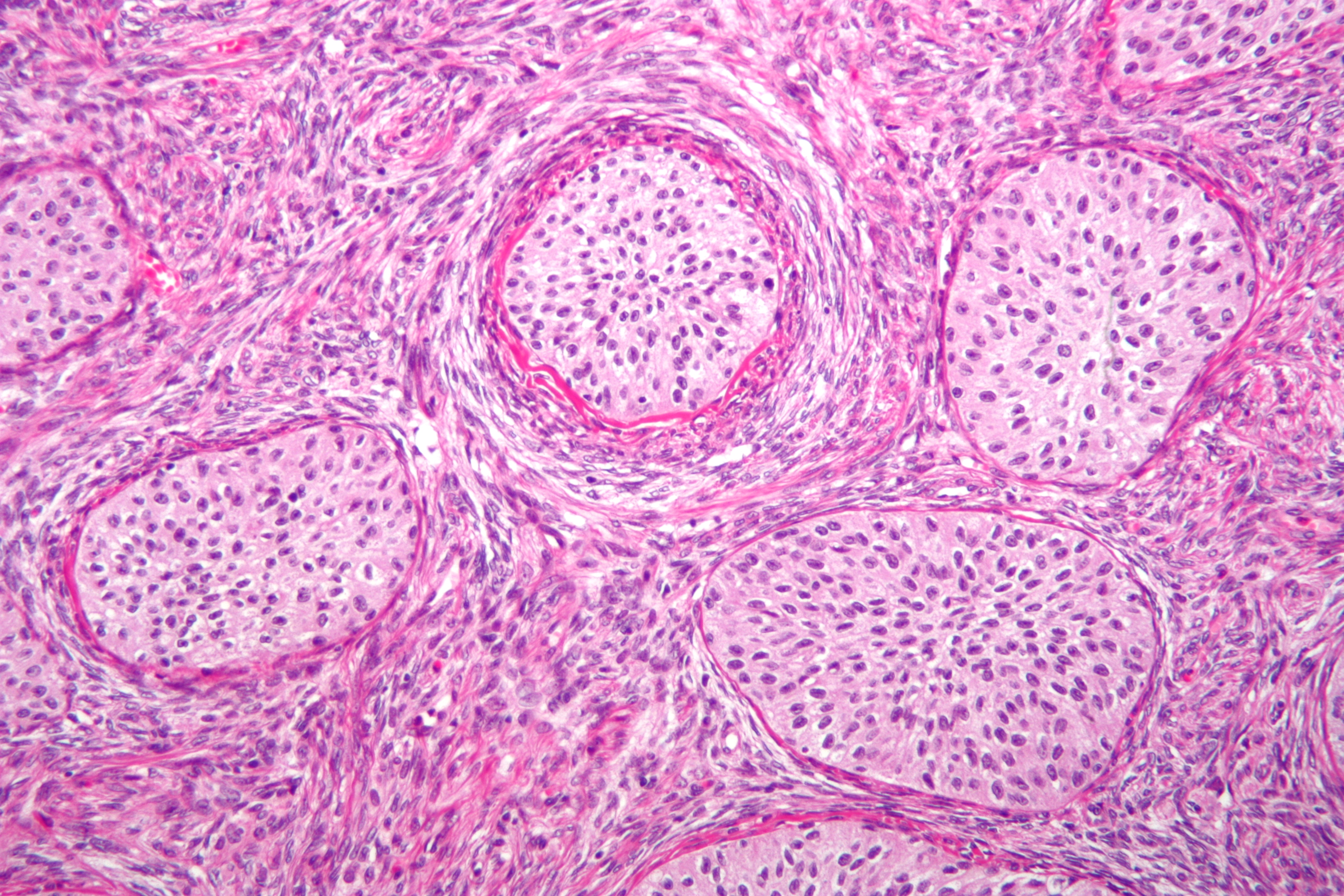
Micrograph of a Brenner tumour. H&E stain.

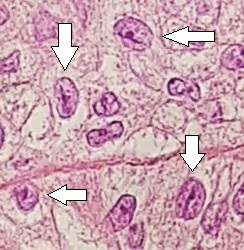
High magnification micrograph of a Brenner tumour showing the characteristic coffee bean nuclei. H&E stain.

Histologically, there are nests of transitional epithelial (urothelial) cells with longitudinal nuclear grooves (coffee bean nuclei) lying in abundant fibrous stroma.

The coffee bean nuclei are the nuclear grooves exceptionally pathognomonic to the sex cord stromal tumour, the ovarian granulosa cell tumour, with the fluid-filled spaces Call–Exner bodies between the granulosa cells.

== Similar conditions ==
Transitional cell carcinoma is an even rarer entity, in which neoplastic transitional epithelial cells similar to transitional cell carcinoma of the bladder are seen in the ovary, without the characteristic stromal/epithelial pattern of a Brenner tumour.

Histologically, Leydig cell tumours of the testes and ovarian stromal Leydig cell tumours (ovarian hyperandrogenism and virilization) both have characteristic Reinke crystals. The same crystals were also noted under high-power view in Brenner tumours.

== Eponym ==
It is named for Fritz Brenner (1877–1969), a German surgeon who characterized it in 1907. The term "Brenner tumour" was first used by Robert Meyer, in 1932.

== Additional images ==
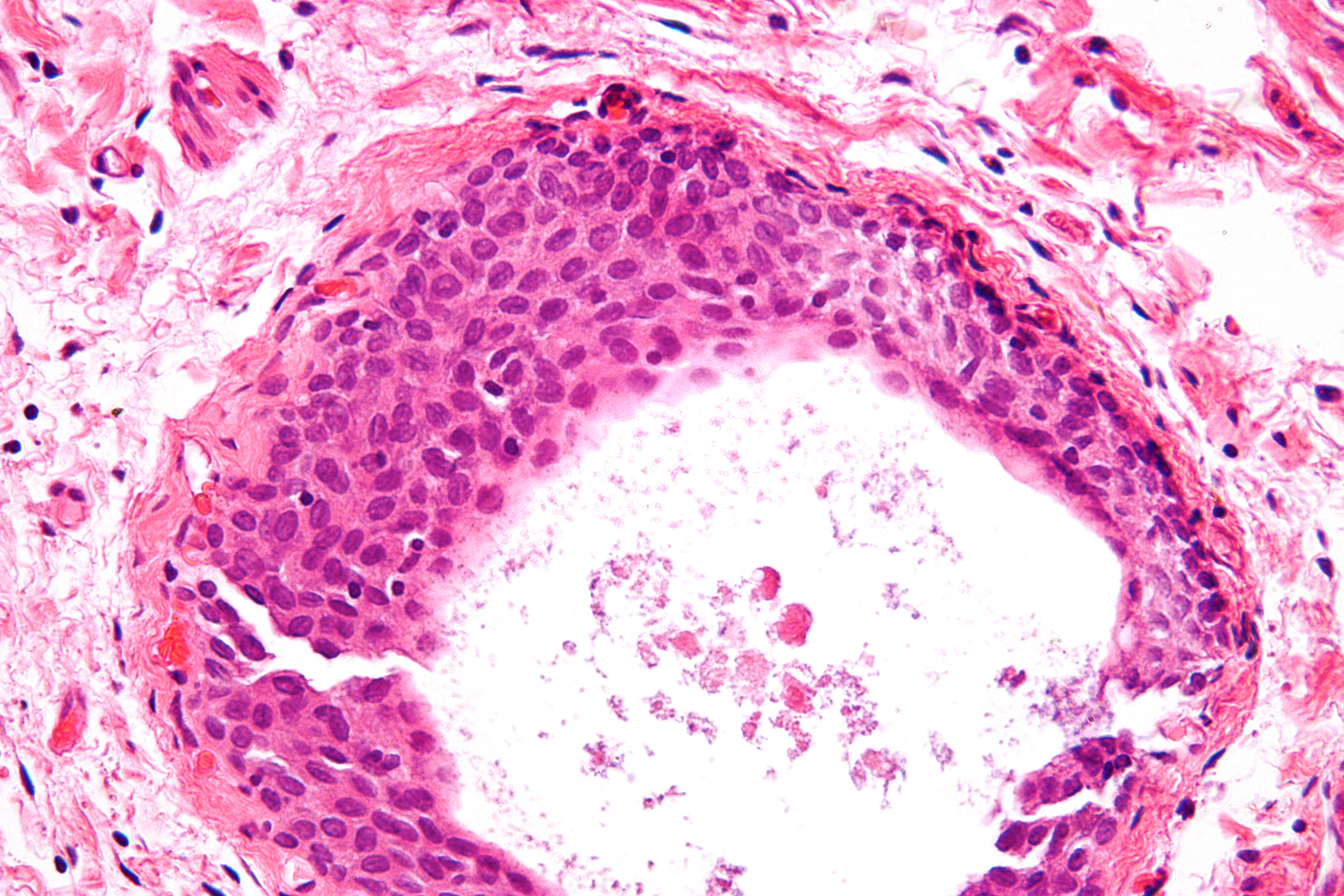
Micrograph of a Walthard cell nest, the entity Brenner tumours are thought to arise from. H&E stain.
