= Paul Ehrlich =

German physician and scientist (1854–1915)

Paul Ehrlich FRS
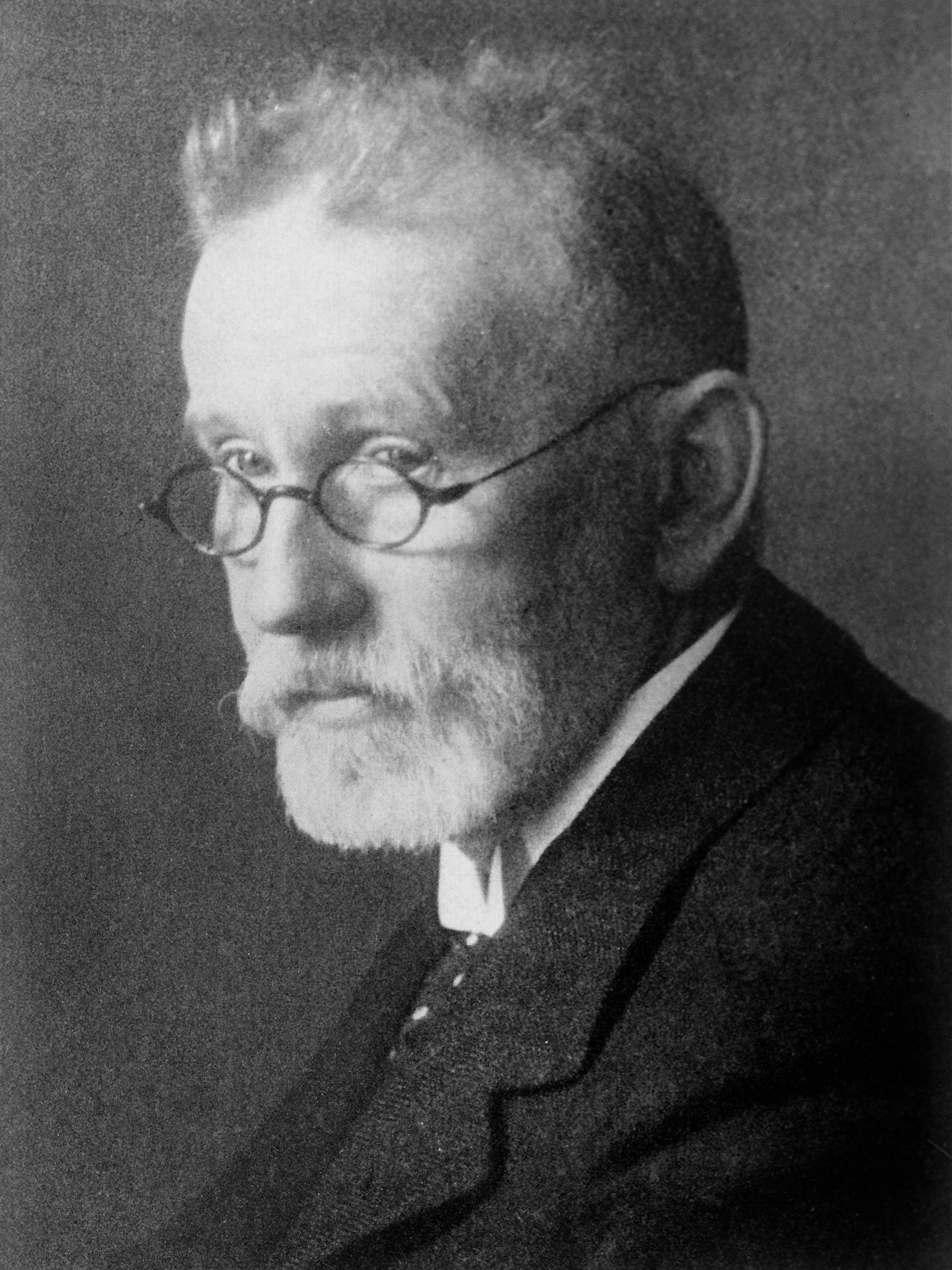
- Ehrlich in 1915
- Born: 14 March 1854; Strehlen, Silesia Province, Prussia
- Died: 20 August 1915 (aged 61); Bad Homburg, Hesse-Nassau, German Empire
- Education: University of Breslau; University of Straßburg; University of Freiburg; University of Leipzig
- Known for: Chemotherapy; Immunology; Basophil; Magic bullet Mast cell Receptor theory Side-chain theory Ehrlich's reagent
- Spouse: Hedwig Pinkus (1864–1948) (m. 1883; 2 children)
- Children: Stephanie and Marianne
- Awards: Nobel Prize in Physiology or Medicine (1908); Cameron Prize of the University of Edinburgh (1914)
- Scientific career
- Fields: Immunology
- Thesis: Beiträge zur Theorie und Praxis der histologischen Färbung (1878)
- Notable students: Hans Schlossberger

Paul Ehrlich (German: [ˈpaʊl ˈeːɐ̯lɪç]; 14 March 1854 – 20 August 1915) was a German physician and scientist who worked in the fields of hematology, immunology and antimicrobial chemotherapy. He shared the 1908 Nobel Prize in Physiology or Medicine with Élie Metchnikoff "in recognition of their work on immunity". Among his foremost achievements were finding a cure for syphilis in 1909 and inventing an important modification of the technique for Gram staining bacteria. The methods he developed for staining tissue made it possible to distinguish between different types of blood cells, which led to the ability to diagnose numerous blood diseases.

His laboratory discovered arsphenamine (Salvarsan), the first antimicrobial drug and first effective medicinal treatment for syphilis, thereby initiating and also naming the concept of chemotherapy. Ehrlich introduced the concept of a magic bullet. He also made a decisive contribution to the development of an antiserum to combat diphtheria and conceived a method for standardising therapeutic serums. He was the founder and first director of the Paul Ehrlich Institute, a German research institution and medical regulatory body named for him in 1947, that is the nation's federal institute for vaccines and biomedicines. A genus of Rickettsiales bacteria, Ehrlichia, is named after him.

Ehrlich has been called "father of Chemotherapy".

== Life and career ==
Ehrlich was born 14 March 1854 in Strehlen in the Prussian Province of Silesia (now Strzelin, Poland). He was the second child of Rosa (Weigert) and Ismar Ehrlich, the leader of the local Jewish community. His father was an innkeeper and distiller of liqueurs and the royal lottery collector in Strehlen, a town of some 5,000 inhabitants. His grandfather, Heymann Ehrlich, had been a fairly successful distiller and tavern manager. Ehrlich was the uncle of Fritz Weigert and cousin of Karl Weigert.

After elementary school, Paul attended the time-honoured secondary school Maria-Magdalenen-Gymnasium in Breslau, where he met Albert Neisser, who later became a colleague. As a schoolboy (inspired by his cousin Karl Weigert who owned one of the first microtomes), he became fascinated by the process of staining microscopic tissue substances. He retained that interest during his subsequent medical studies.

Ehrlich studied medicine in Breslau and Strasbourg from 1872, with a short stay in Freiburg, and received his doctorate in Leipzig in 1878, where his doctoral advisor, Julius Cohnheim, had moved.

After obtaining his doctorate, he worked at the Charité in Berlin as an assistant medical director under Theodor Frerichs, the founder of experimental clinical medicine, focusing on histology, hematology and colour chemistry (dyes).

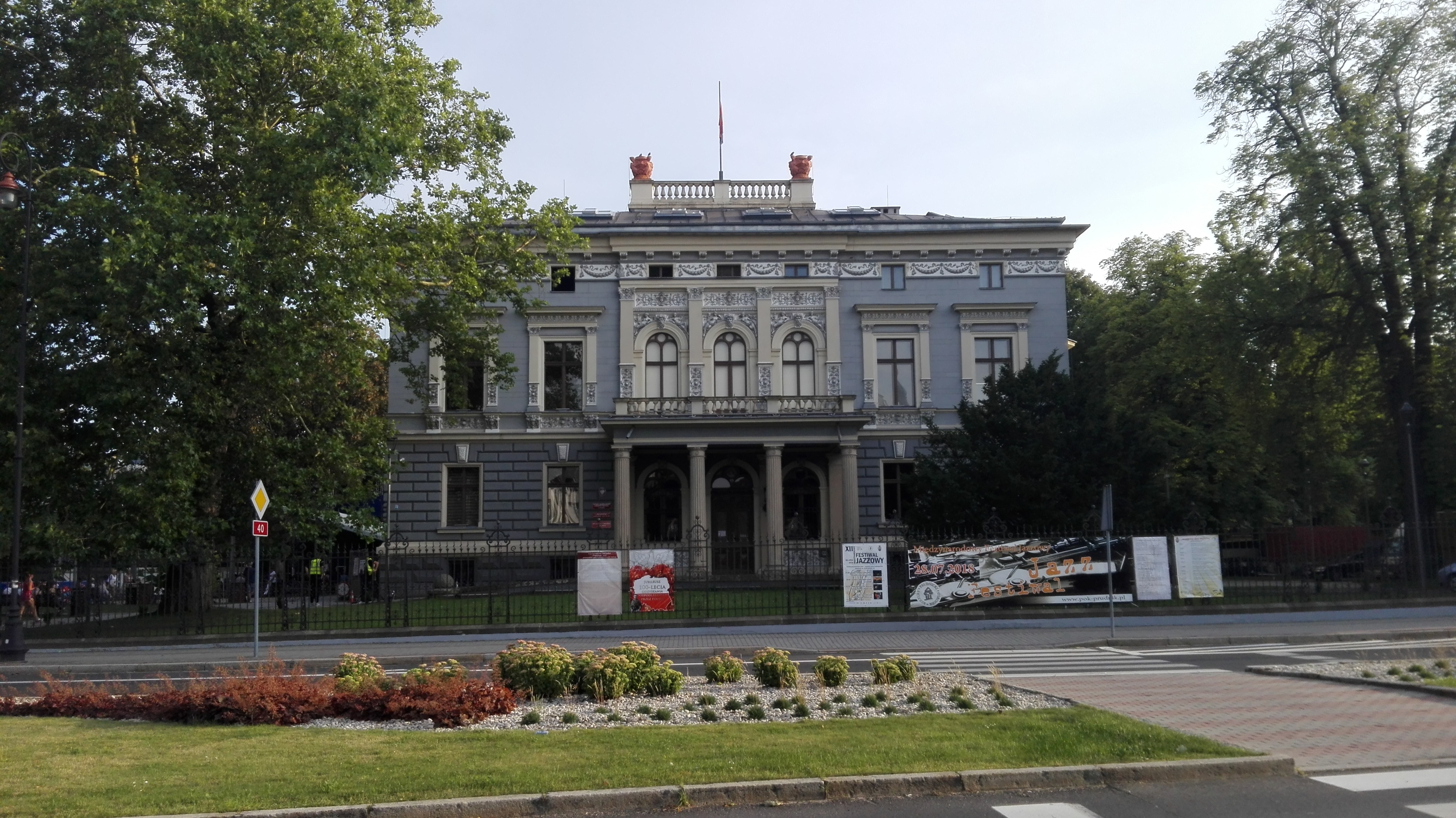
Villa of the Fränkel family in Prudnik (Neustadt)

He married Hedwig Pinkus (1864–1948) in 1883 in the synagogue in Neustadt (now Prudnik, Poland). The couple had two daughters, Stephanie and Marianne. Hedwig was a sister of Max Pinkus, who was an owner of the textile factory in Neustadt (later known as ZPB "Frotex"). He settled in the villa of the Fränkel family on Wiesenerstrasse in Neustadt.

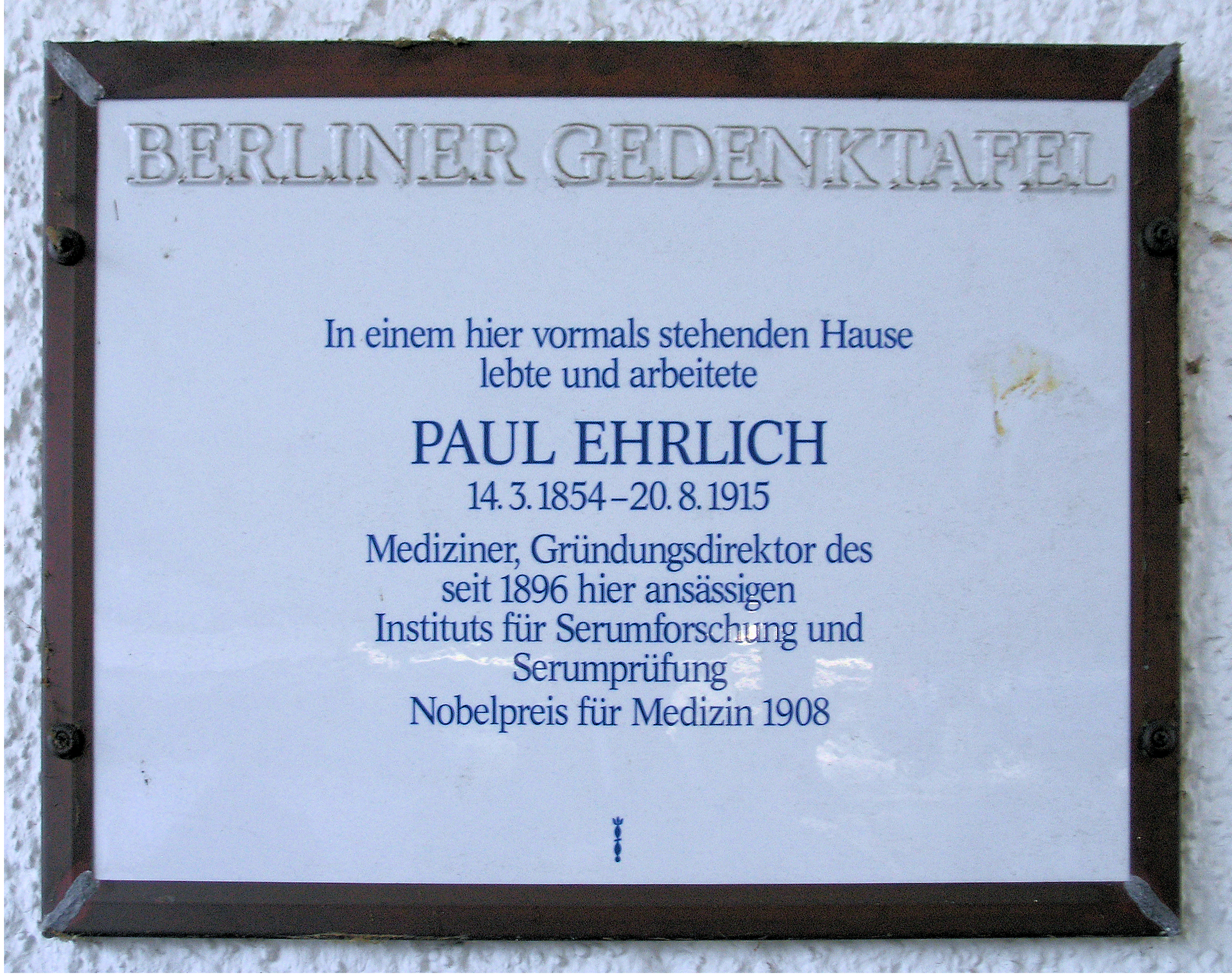
Commemorative plaque at Bergstraße 96 in Berlin-Steglitz, where Ehrlich lived and worked from 1890 to 1899

After completing his clinical education and habilitation at the prominent Charité medical school and teaching hospital in Berlin in 1886, Ehrlich travelled to Egypt and other countries in 1888 and 1889, in part to cure a case of tuberculosis which he had contracted in the laboratory. Upon his return he established a private medical practice and small laboratory in Berlin-Steglitz. In 1891, Robert Koch invited Ehrlich to join the staff at his Berlin Institute of Infectious Diseases, where in 1896 a new branch, the Institute for Serum Research and Testing (Institut für Serumforschung und Serumprüfung), was established for Ehrlich's specialisation. Ehrlich was named its founding director.

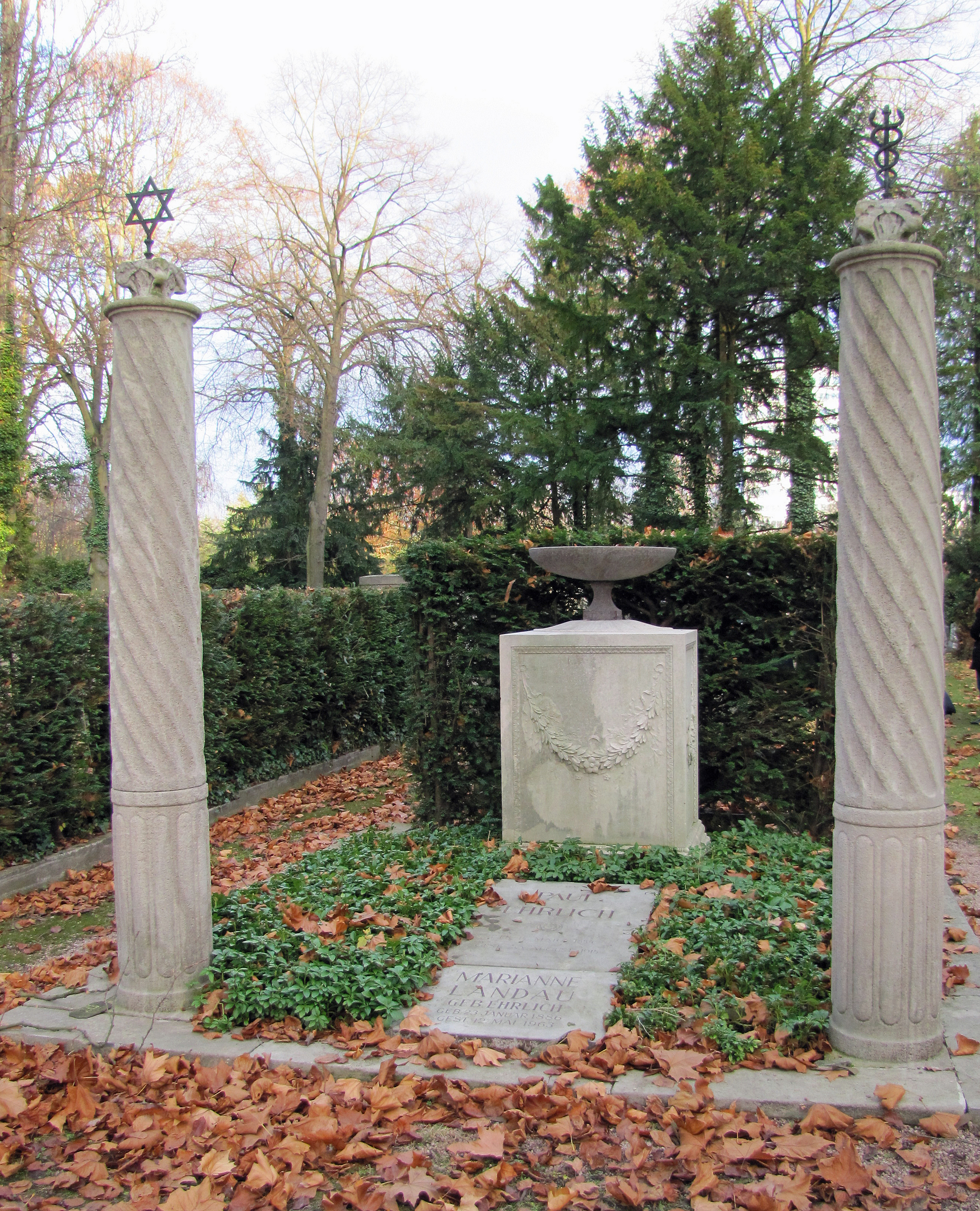
Ehrlich's grave in the Jewish cemetery on Rat-Beil-Straße in Frankfurt am Main

In 1899 his institute moved to Frankfurt am Main and was renamed the Institute of Experimental Therapy (Institut für experimentelle Therapie). One of his important collaborators there was Max Neisser. In 1904, Ehrlich received a full position of honorary professor from the University of Göttingen. In 1906 Ehrlich became the director of the Georg Speyer House in Frankfurt, a private research foundation affiliated with his institute. Here he discovered in 1909 the first drug to be targeted against a specific pathogen: Salvarsan, a treatment for syphilis, which was at that time one of the most lethal and infectious diseases in Europe. In 1914, Ehrlich was awarded the Cameron Prize of the University of Edinburgh. Among the foreign guest scientists working with Ehrlich at his institute were two Nobel Prize winners, Henry Hallett Dale and Paul Karrer. The institute was renamed Paul Ehrlich Institute in Ehrlich's honour in 1947.

In 1914, Ehrlich signed the Manifesto of the Ninety-Three which was a defence of Germany's World War I politics and militarism. On 17 August 1915 Ehrlich suffered a heart attack and died on 20 August in the Hessian town of Bad Homburg. Wilhelm II the German emperor, wrote in a telegram of condolence, "I, along with the entire civilized world, mourn the death of this meritorious researcher for his great service to medical science and suffering humanity; his life's work ensures undying fame and the gratitude of both his contemporaries and posterity".

Ehrlich was buried at the Old Jewish Cemetery in Frankfurt (Block 114 N).

== Research ==
=== Hematological staining ===
Hand drawings of cells, Paul Ehrlich, 1877

In the early 1870s, Ehrlich's cousin Karl Weigert was the first person to stain bacteria with dyes and to introduce aniline pigments for histological studies and bacterial diagnostics. During his studies in Strassburg under the anatomist Heinrich Wilhelm Waldeyer, Ehrlich continued the research started by his cousin in dyes and staining tissues for microscopic study. He spent his eighth university semester in Freiburg im Breisgau investigating primarily the red dye dahlia (monophenylrosanilin), giving rise to his first publication.

In 1878 he followed his dissertation supervisor Julius Friedrich Cohnheim to Leipzig, and obtained a doctorate with a dissertation entitled "Contributions to the Theory and Practice of Histological Staining" (Beiträge zur Theorie und Praxis der histologischen Färbung).

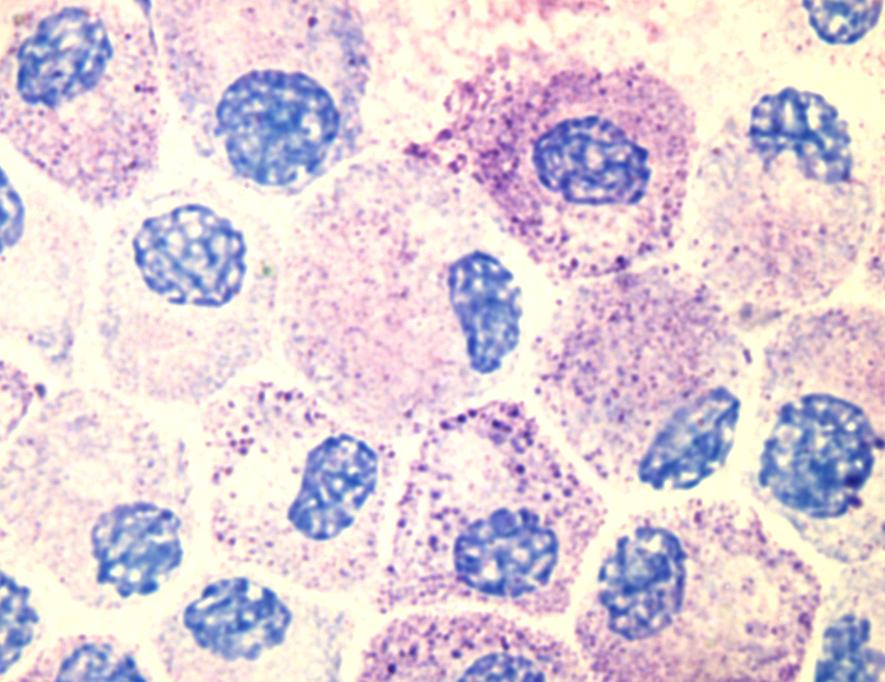
Photo of cultured mast cells at 100× stained with Tol Blue

One of the most outstanding results of his dissertation investigations was the discovery of a new cell type. Ehrlich discovered in the protoplasm of supposed plasma cells a granulate which could be made visible with the help of an alkaline dye. He thought this granulate was a sign of good nourishment, and accordingly named these cells mast cells, (from the German word for an animal-fattening feed, Mast). This focus on chemistry was unusual for a medical dissertation. In it, Ehrlich presented the entire spectrum of known staining techniques and the chemistry of the pigments employed. While he was at the Charité, Ehrlich elaborated upon the differentiation of white blood cells according to their different granules. A precondition was a dry specimen technique, which he also developed. A drop of blood placed between two glass slides and heated over a Bunsen burner fixed the blood cells while still allowing them to be stained. Ehrlich used both alkaline and acid dyes, and also created new "neutral" dyes. For the first time this made it possible to differentiate the lymphocytes among the leucocytes (white blood cells). By studying their granulation he could distinguish between nongranular lymphocytes, mono- and poly-nuclear leucocytes, eosinophil granulocytes and mast cells.

Paul Ehrlich, hand drawings of cells, 1877

Starting in 1880, Ehrlich also studied red blood cells. He demonstrated the existence of nucleated red blood cells, which he Erythropoiesis subdivided into normoblasts, megaloblasts, microblasts and poikiloblasts; he had discovered the precursors of erythrocytes. Ehrlich thus also laid the basis for the analysis of anemias, after he had created the basis for systematising leukemias with his investigation of white blood cells.

His duties at the Charité included analysing patients' blood and urine specimens. In 1881 he published a new urine test which could be used to distinguish different types of typhoid from simple cases of diarrhea. The intensity of staining made possible a disease prognosis. The pigment solution he used became known as Ehrlich's reagent. Ehrlich's great achievement, but also a source of problems during his further career, was that he had initiated a new field of study interrelating chemistry, biology and medicine. Much of his work was rejected by the medical profession, which lacked the requisite chemical knowledge. It also meant that there was no suitable professorship in sight for Ehrlich.

=== Serum research ===
==== Friendship with Robert Koch ====
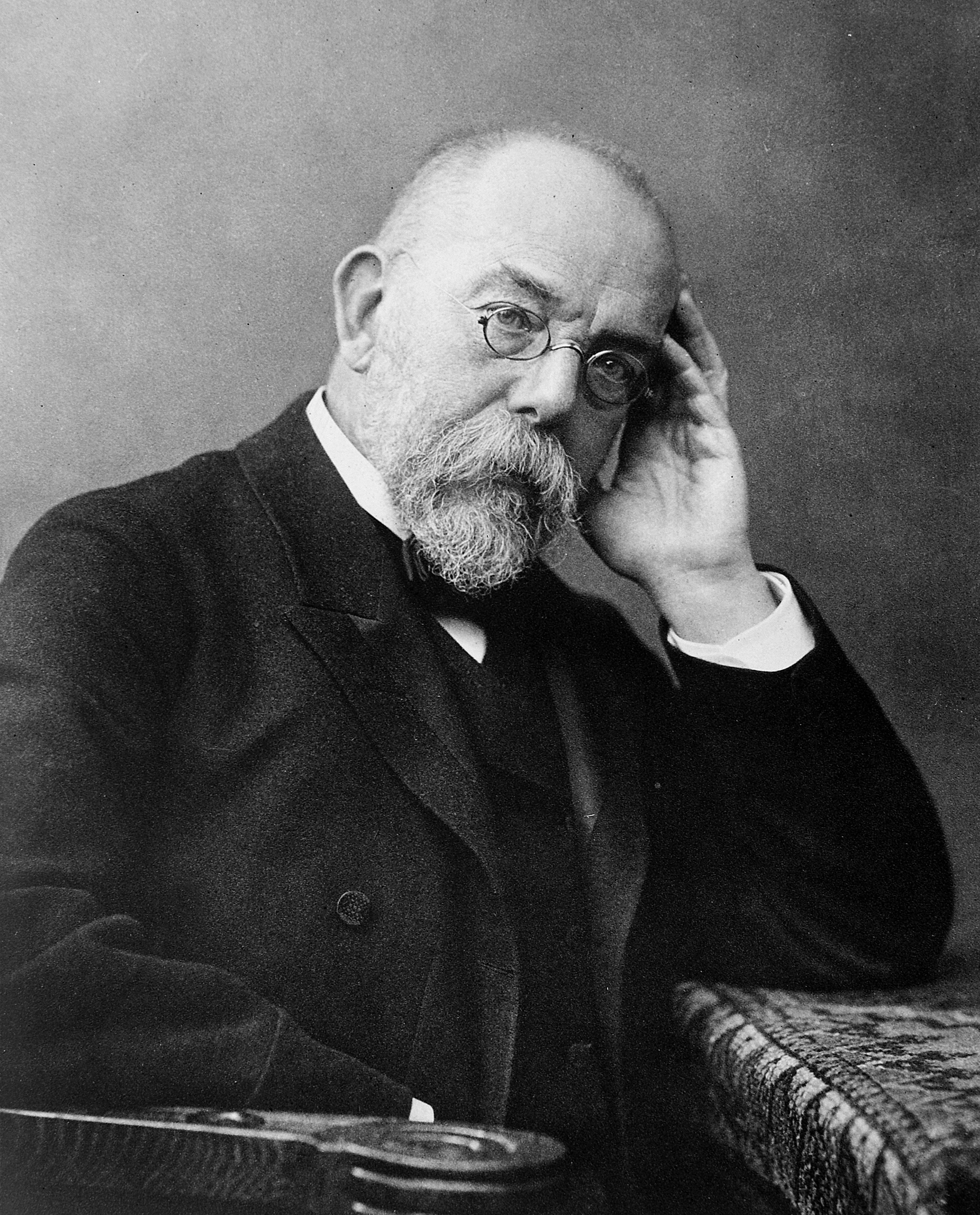
Robert Koch, around 1900

When a student in Breslau, Ehrlich was given an opportunity by the pathologist Julius Friedrich Cohnheim to conduct extensive research and was also introduced to Robert Koch, who was at the time a district physician in Wollstein, Posen Province. In his spare time, Koch had clarified the life cycle of the anthrax pathogen and had contacted Ferdinand Cohn, who was quickly convinced by Koch's work and introduced him to his Breslau colleagues. From 30 April to 2 May 1876, Koch presented his investigations in Breslau, which the student Ehrlich was able to attend.

On 24 March 1882, Ehrlich was present when Koch, working since 1880 at the Imperial Public Health Office (Kaiserliches Gesundheitsamt) in Berlin, presented the lecture in which he reported how he was able to identify the tuberculosis pathogen. Ehrlich later described this lecture as his "greatest experience in science". The day after Koch's lecture, Ehrlich had already made an improvement to Koch's staining method, which Koch unreservedly welcomed. From this date on, the two men were bound in friendship.

In 1887 Ehrlich became an unsalaried lecturer in internal medicine (Privatdozent für Innere Medizin) at Berlin University, and in 1890 took over the tuberculosis station at a public hospital in Berlin-Moabit at Koch's request. This was where Koch's hoped-for tuberculosis therapeutic agent tuberculin was under study; and Ehrlich had even injected himself with it. In the ensuing tuberculin scandal, Ehrlich tried to support Koch and stressed the value of tuberculin for diagnostic purposes. In 1891 Koch invited Ehrlich to work at the newly founded Institut für Infektionskrankheiten (Institute of Infectious Diseases, which became the Robert Koch Institute) at Friedrich-Wilhelms-Universität (Humboldt University) in Berlin. Koch was unable to give him any remuneration, but did offer him full access to laboratory staff, patients, chemicals and laboratory animals, which Ehrlich always remembered with gratitude.

==== First work on immunity ====
Ehrlich had started his first experiments on immunisation already in his private laboratory. He accustomed mice to the poisons ricin and abrin. After feeding them with small but increasing dosages of ricin he ascertained that they had become "ricin-proof". Ehrlich interpreted this as immunisation and observed that it was abruptly initiated after a few days and was still in existence after several months, but mice immunised against ricin were just as sensitive to abrin as untreated animals.

This was followed by investigations on the "inheritance" of acquired immunity. It was already known that in some cases after a smallpox or syphilis infection, specific immunity was transmitted from the parents to their offspring. Ehrlich rejected inheritance in the genetic sense because the offspring of a male mouse immunised against abrin and an untreated female mouse were not immune to abrin. He concluded that the foetus was supplied with antibodies via the pulmonary circulation of the mother. This idea was supported by the fact that this "inherited immunity" decreased after a few months. In another experiment he exchanged the offspring of treated and untreated female mice. The mice which were nursed by the treated females were protected from the poison, providing the proof that antibodies can also be conveyed in milk.

Ehrlich also researched autoimmunity, but he specifically rejected the possibility that an organism's immune system could attack the organism's own tissue calling it "horror autotoxicus". It was Ehrlich's student, Ernest Witebsky, who demonstrated that autoimmunity could cause disease in humans. Ehrlich was the first to propose that regulatory mechanisms existed to protect an organism from autoimmunity, saying in 1906 that "the organism possesses certain contrivances by means of which the immunity reaction, so easily produced by all kinds of cells, is prevented from acting against the organism's own elements".

==== Work with Behring on a diphtheria serum ====
Emil Behring had worked at the Berlin Institute of Infectious Diseases until 1893 on developing an antiserum for treating diphtheria and tetanus but with inconsistent results. Koch suggested that Behring and Ehrlich cooperate on the project. This joint work was successful to the extent that Ehrlich was quickly able to increase the level of immunity of the laboratory animals based on his experience with mice. Clinical tests with diphtheria serum early in 1894 were successful and in August the chemical company Hoechst started to market Behring's "Diphtheria Remedy synthesised by Behring-Ehrlich". The two discoverers had originally agreed to share any profits after the Hoechst share had been subtracted. Their contract was changed several times and finally Ehrlich was eventually pressured into accepting a profit share of only eight percent. Ehrlich resented what he considered as unfair treatment, and his relationship with Behring was thereafter problematic, a situation which later escalated over the issue of the valency of tetanus serum. Ehrlich recognised that the principle of serum therapy had been developed by Behring and Kitasato. But he was of the opinion that he had been the first to develop a serum which could also be used on humans, and that his role in developing the diphtheria serum had been insufficiently acknowledged. Behring, for his part, schemed against Ehrlich at the Prussian Ministry of Culture, and from 1900 on Ehrlich refused to collaborate with him. Von Behring was the sole recipient of the first Nobel Prize in Medicine, in 1901, for contributions to research on diphtheria.

==== The valency of serums ====
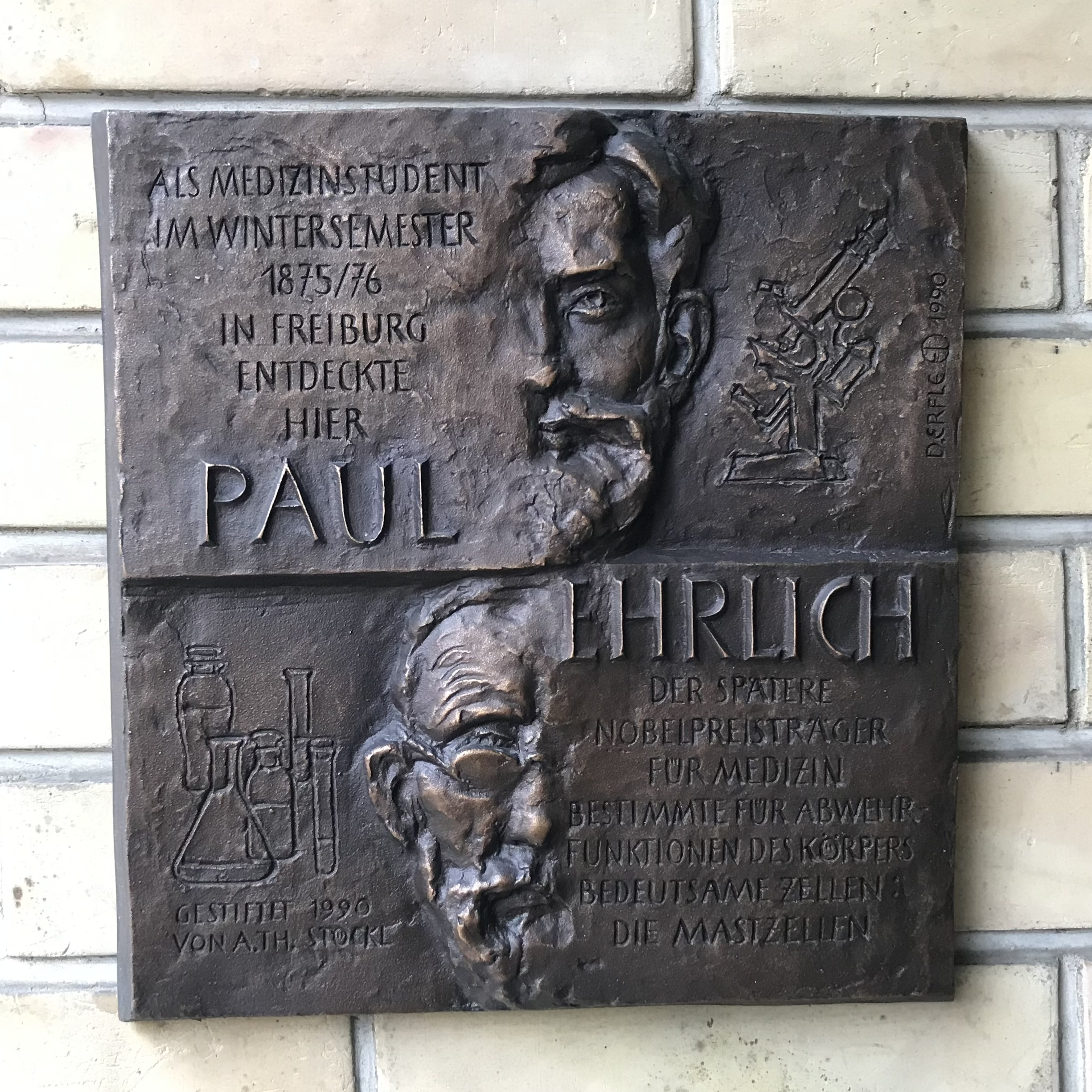
Commemorative plaque at the entrance of the anatomy institute of Freiburg University where Paul Ehrlich, as a medical student in the winter semester 1875/76, discovered the mast cells

Since antiserums were an entirely new type of medicine whose quality was highly variable, a government system was established to guarantee their safety and effectiveness. Beginning 1 April 1895, only government-approved serum could be sold in the German Reich. The testing station for diphtheria serum was provisionally housed at the Institute of Infectious Diseases. At the initiative of Friedrich Althoff, an Institute of Serum Research and Testing (Institut für Serumforschung und Serumprüfung) was established in 1896 in Berlin-Steglitz, with Ehrlich as director (which required him to cancel all his contracts with Hoechst). In this function and as honorary professor at Berliner University he had annual earnings of 6,000 marks, approximately the salary of a university professor. In addition to a testing department the institute had a research department.

In order to determine the effectiveness of diphtheria antiserum, a stable concentration of diphtheria toxin was required. Ehrlich discovered that the toxin being used was perishable, in contrast to what had been assumed, which for him led to two consequences: he did not use the toxin as a standard, but instead a serum powder developed by Behring, which had to be dissolved in liquid shortly before use. The strength of a test toxin was first determined in comparison with this standard. The test toxin could then be used as a reference for testing other serums. For the test itself, toxin and serum were mixed in a ratio so that their effects just cancelled each other when injected into a guinea pig. But since there was a large margin in determining whether symptoms of illness were present, Ehrlich established an unambiguous target: the death of the animal. The mixture was to be such that the test animal would die after four days. If it died earlier, the serum was too weak and was rejected. Ehrlich claimed to have made the determination of the valency of serum as accurate as it would be with chemical titration. This again demonstrates his tendency to quantify the life sciences.

Influenced by the mayor of Frankfurt am Main, Franz Adickes, who endeavored to establish science institutions in Frankfurt in preparation of the founding of a university, Ehrlich's institute moved to Frankfurt in 1899 and was renamed the Royal Prussian Institute of Experimental Therapy (Königlich Preußisches Institut für Experimentelle Therapie). The German quality-control methodology was copied by government serum institutes all over the world, and they also obtained the standard serum from Frankfurt. After diphtheria antiserum, tetanus serum and various bactericide serums for use in veterinary medicine were developed in rapid sequence. These were also evaluated at the institute, as was tuberculin and later on various vaccines. Ehrlich's most important colleague at the institute was the Jewish physician and biologist Julius Morgenroth.

==== Ehrlich's side-chain theory ====
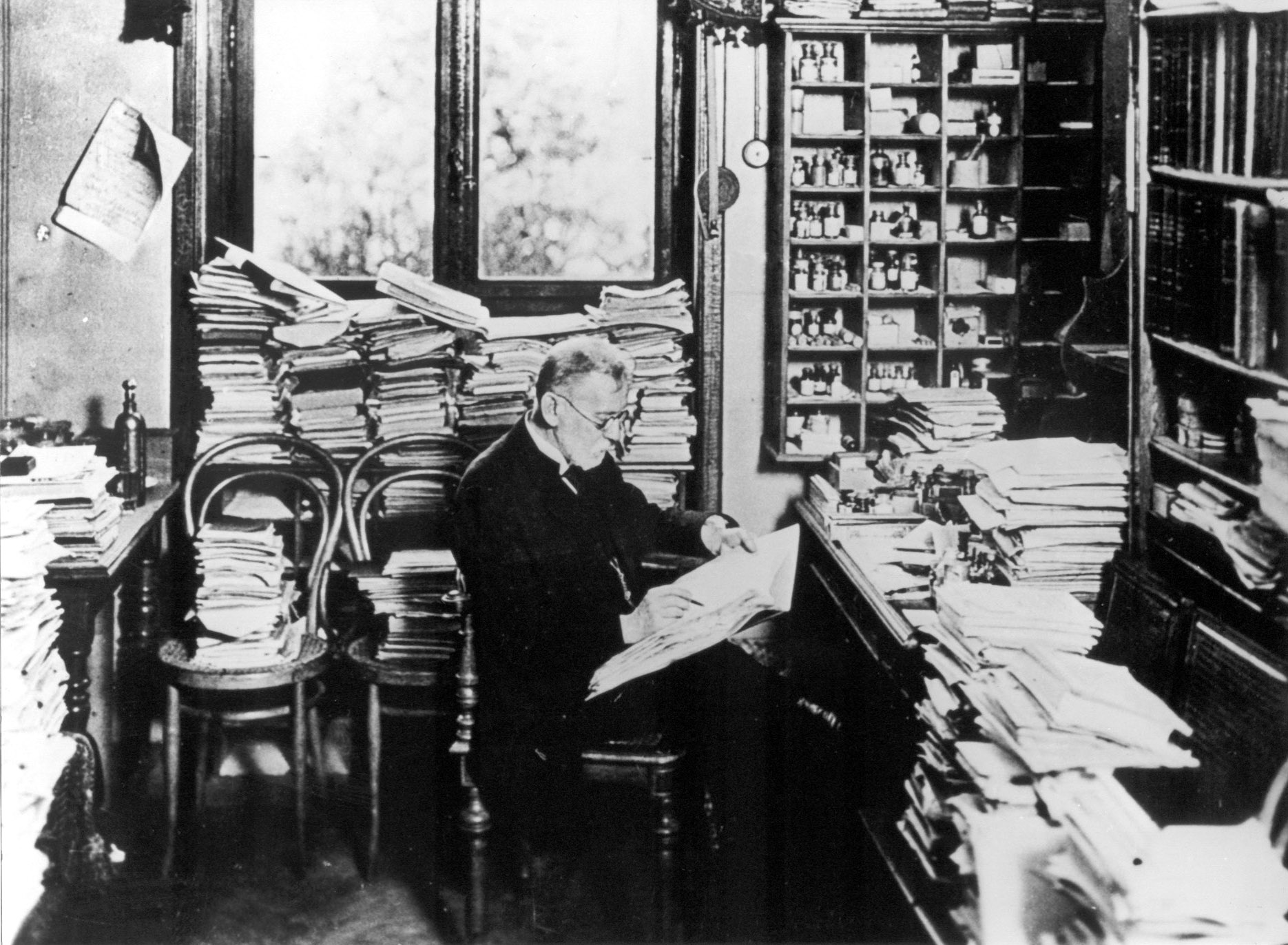
Paul Ehrlich around 1900 in his Frankfurt office

Ehrlich postulated that cell protoplasm contains structures which have chemical side chains (macromolecules) to which the toxin binds, affecting function. If the organism survives the effects of the toxin, the blocked side-chains are replaced by new ones. This regeneration can be trained, the name for this phenomenon being immunisation. If the cell produces a surplus of side chains, these might also be released into the blood as antibodies.

In the following years Ehrlich expanded his side chain theory using concepts ("amboceptors", "receptors of the first, second and third order", etc.) which are no longer customary. Between the antigen and the antibody he assumed there was an additional immune molecule, which he called an "additive" or a "complement". For him, the side chain contained at least two functional groups.

For providing a theoretical basis for immunology as well as for his work on serum valency, Ehrlich was awarded the Nobel Prize for Physiology or Medicine in 1908 together with Élie Metchnikoff. Metchnikoff, who had researched the cellular branch of immunity, phagocytosis, at the Pasteur Institute had previously sharply attacked Ehrlich.

=== Cancer research ===
In 1901, the Prussian Ministry of Finance criticised Ehrlich for exceeding his budget and as a consequence reduced his income. In this situation Althoff arranged a contact with Georg Speyer, a Jewish philanthropist and joint owner of the bank house Lazard Speyer-Ellissen. The cancerous disease of Princess Victoria, the widow of the German Emperor Friedrich III, had received much public attention and prompted a collection among wealthy Frankfurt citizens, including Speyer, in support of cancer research. Ehrlich had also received from the German Emperor Wilhelm II a personal request to devote all his energy to cancer research. Such efforts led to the founding of a department for cancer research affiliated with the Institute of Experimental Therapy. The chemist Gustav Embden, among others, worked there. Ehrlich informed his sponsors that cancer research meant basic research, and that a cure could not be expected soon.

Among the results achieved by Ehrlich and his research colleagues was the insight that when tumors are cultivated by transplanting tumor cells, their malignancy increases from generation to generation. If the primary tumor is removed, then metastasis precipitously increases. Ehrlich applied bacteriological methods to cancer research. In analogy to vaccination, he attempted to generate immunity to cancer by injecting weakened cancer cells. Both in cancer research and chemotherapy research (see below) he introduced the methodologies of Big Science.

=== Chemotherapy ===
==== In vivo staining ====
In 1885 Ehrlich's monograph "The Need of the Organism for Oxygen" (Das Sauerstoffbedürfnis des Organismus – Eine farbenanalytische Studie) appeared, which he also submitted as a habilitation thesis. In it he introduced the new technology of in vivo staining. One of his findings was that pigments can only be easily assimilated by living organisms if they are in granular form. He injected the dyes alizarin blue and indophenol blue into laboratory animals and established after their death that various organs had been coloured to different degrees. In organs with high oxygen saturation, indophenol was retained; in organs with medium saturation, indophenol was reduced, but not alizarin blue. And in areas with low oxygen saturation, both pigments were reduced. With this work, Ehrlich also formulated the conviction which guided his research: that all life processes can be traced to processes of physical chemistry occurring in the cell.

==== Methylene blue ====
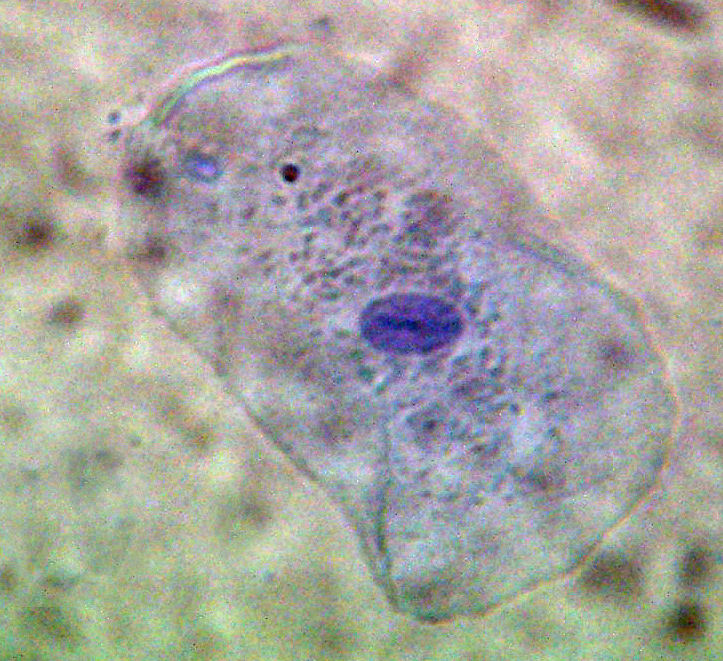
Staining in vivo with methylene blue of a cell from the mucous membrane of a human mouth

In the course of his investigations Ehrlich came across methylene blue, which he regarded as particularly suitable for staining bacteria. Later, Robert Koch also used methylene blue as a dye in his research on the tuberculosis pathogen. In Ehrlich's view, an added benefit was that methylene blue also stained the long appendages of nerve cells, the axons. He initiated a doctoral dissertation on the subject, but did not follow up the topic himself. It was the opinion of the neurologist Ludwig Edinger that Ehrlich had thereby opened up a major new topic in the field of neurology.

After mid-1889, when Ehrlich was unemployed, he privately continued his research on methylene blue. His work on in vivo staining gave him the idea of using it therapeutically. Since the parasite family of Plasmodiidae – which includes the malaria pathogen – can be stained with methylene blue, he thought it could possibly be used in the treatment of malaria. In the case of two patients so treated at the city hospital in Berlin-Moabit, their fever indeed subsided and the malaria plasmodia disappeared from their blood. Ehrlich obtained methylene blue from the company Meister Lucius & Brüning AG (later renamed Hoechst AG), which started a long collaboration with this company.

==== The search for a chemotherapia specifica ====
Before the Institute of Experimental Therapy had moved to Frankfurt, Ehrlich had already resumed work on methylene blue. After the death of Georg Speyer, his widow Franziska Speyer endowed the Georg-Speyer House in his memory which was erected next door to Ehrlich's institute. As director of the Georg-Speyer House, Ehrlich transferred his chemotherapeutic research there. He was looking for an agent which was as effective as methylene blue, but without its side effects. His model was on the one hand the impact of quinine on malaria, and on the other hand, in analogy to serum therapy, he thought there must also be chemical pharmaceuticals which would have just as specific an effect on individual diseases. His goal was to find a Therapia sterilisans magna, in other words a treatment that could kill all disease pathogens.

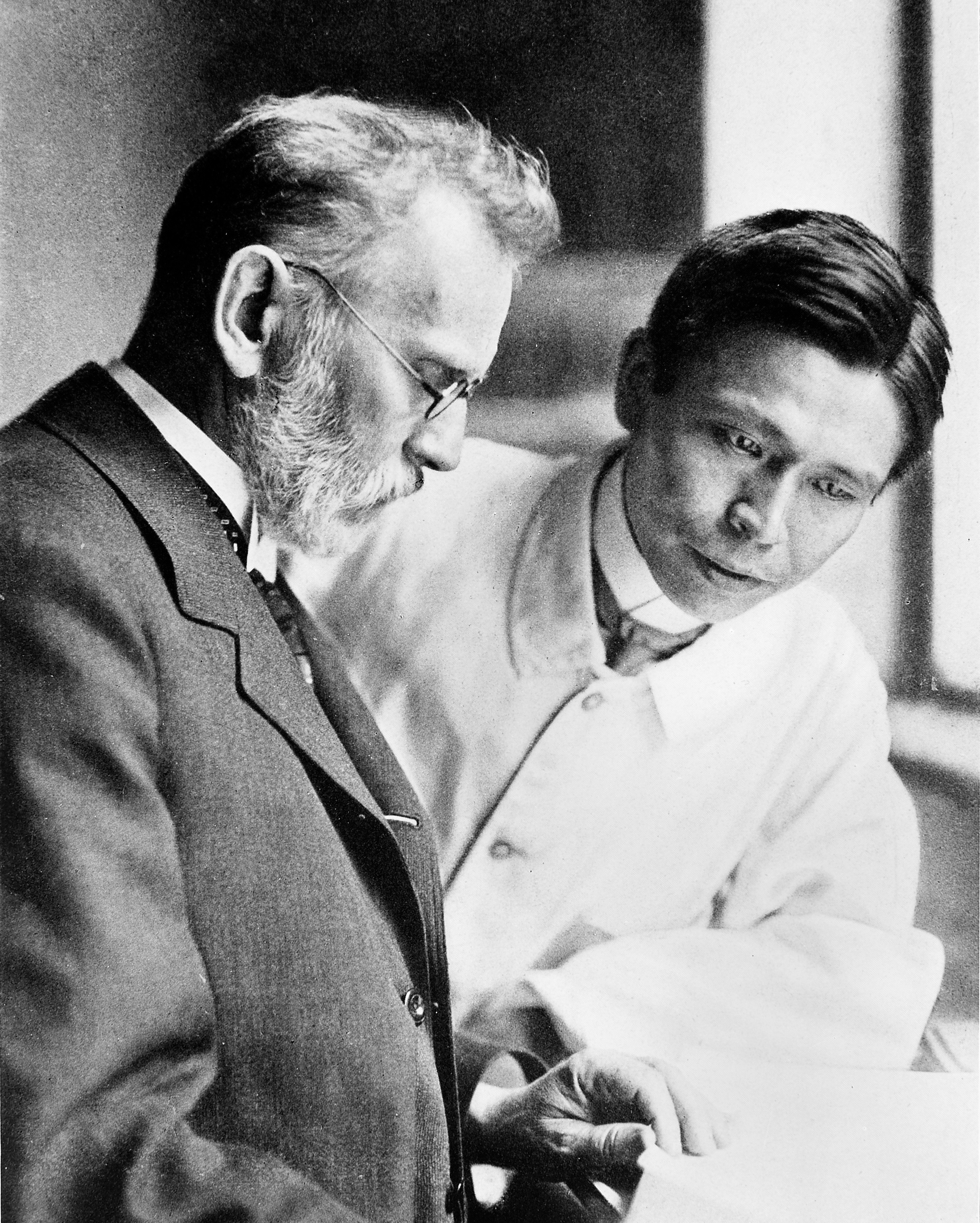
Ehrlich and Sahachiro Hata

As a model for experimental therapy Ehrlich used a guinea pig disease trypanosoma and tested out various chemical substances on laboratory animals. The trypanosomes could indeed be successfully killed with the dye trypan red. Beginning in 1906, he intensively investigated Atoxyl and had it tested by Robert Koch along with other arsenic compounds during Koch's sleeping sickness expedition of 1906/07. Although the name literally means "nonpoisonous", Atoxyl does cause damage, especially to the optic nerve. Ehrlich elaborated the systematic testing of chemical compounds in the sense of screening as later practiced in the pharmaceutical industry. He discovered that Compound 418 - arsenophenylglycine - had an impressive therapeutic effect and had it tested in Africa.

With the support of his assistant Sahachiro Hata Ehrlich discovered in 1909 that Compound 606, arsphenamine, effectively combatted "spirillum" spirochaete bacteria, one of whose subspecies causes syphilis. The compound proved to have few side effects in human trials, and the spirochetes disappeared in seven syphilis patients after this treatment.

After extensive clinical testing (all the research participants had the negative example of tuberculin in mind) the Hoechst company began to market the compound toward the end of 1910 under the name Salvarsan. This was the first agent with a specific therapeutic effect to be created on the basis of theoretical considerations. Salvarsan proved to be amazingly effective, particularly when compared with the conventional therapy of mercury salts. Manufactured by Hoechst AG, Salvarsan became the most widely prescribed drug in the world. It was the most effective drug for treating syphilis until penicillin became available in the 1940s. Salvarsan required improvement as to side effects and solubility and was replaced in 1911 with Neosalvarsan. Ehrlich's work illuminated the existence of the blood-brain barrier, although he himself never believed in such a barrier, with Lina Stern later coining the phrase.

The medication triggered the so-called "Salvarsan war". On one side there was hostility on the part of those who feared a resulting moral breakdown of sexual inhibitions. Ehrlich was also accused, with clearly anti-Semitic undertones, of excessively enriching himself. In addition, Ehrlich's associate, Paul Uhlenhuth claimed priority in discovering the drug.

Because some people died during the clinical testing, Ehrlich was accused of "stopping at nothing." In 1914, one of the most prominent accusers was convicted of criminal libel at a trial for which Ehrlich was called to testify. Though Ehrlich was thereby exonerated, the ordeal threw him into a depression from which he never fully recovered.

=== Magic bullet ===
Ehrlich reasoned that if a compound could be made that selectively targeted a disease-causing organism, then a toxin for that organism could be delivered along with the agent of selectivity. Hence, a "magic bullet" (Zauberkugel, his term for an ideal therapeutic agent) would be created that killed only the organism targeted. The concept of a "magic bullet" has to some extent been realised by the development of antibody-drug conjugates (a monoclonal antibody linked to a cytotoxic biologically active drug), as they enable cytotoxic drugs to be selectively delivered to their designated targets (e.g. cancer cells).

== Legacy ==
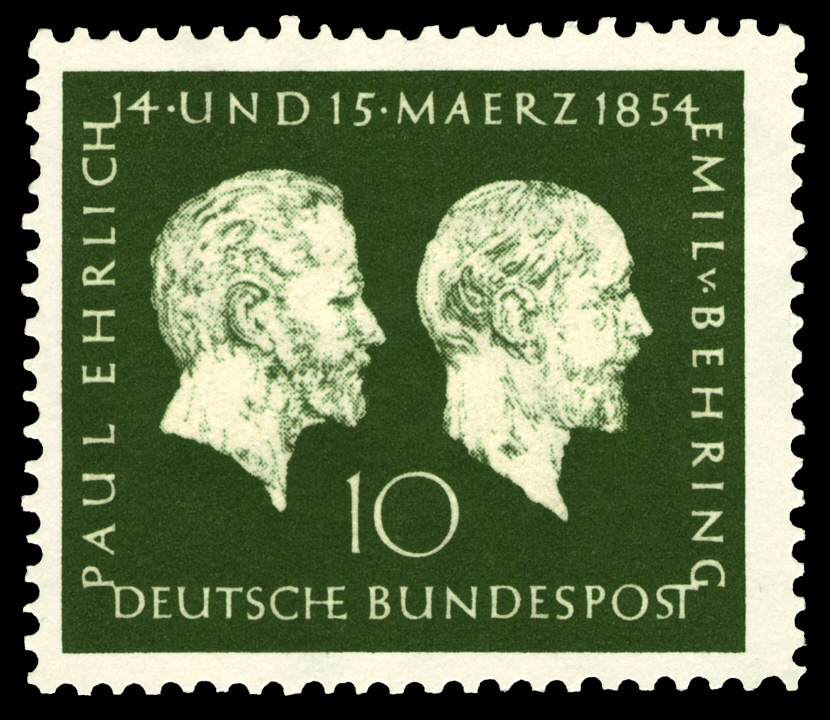
West German postage stamp (1954) commemorating Paul Ehrlich and Emil von Behring

In 1910, a street was named after Ehrlich in Frankfurt-Sachsenhausen. In Nazi Germany, Ehrlich's achievements were ignored while Emil Adolf von Behring was stylised as the ideal Aryan scientist, and the street named after Ehrlich was given another name. Shortly after the end of the war the name Paul-Ehrlich-Strasse was reinstated, and numerous German cities have since had streets named after Ehrlich.

During the anti-Jewish Kristallnacht rampages of 9–10 November 1938, a portrait of Ehrlich was "slashed to ribbons"; the painting was restored by a neighbor.

Ehrlich's life and work was featured in the 1940 U.S. film Dr. Ehrlich's Magic Bullet with Edward G. Robinson in the title role. It focused on Salvarsan (arsphenamine, "compound 606"), his cure for syphilis. Since the Nazi government was opposed to this tribute to a Jewish scientist, attempts were made to keep the film a secret in Germany. The film was nominated for an Academy Award for Best Original Screenplay.

West Germany issued a postage stamp in 1954 on the 100th anniversary of the births of Ehrlich (14 March 1854) and Emil von Behring (15 March 1854).

The 200 Deutsche Mark bank note, issued until 2001, featured Ehrlich.

The German Paul Ehrlich Institute, the successor to the Steglitz Institute for Serum Research and Serum Testing and the Frankfurt Royal Institute for Experimental Therapy, was named in 1947 after Ehrlich, its first director.

Ehrlich's name is also borne by many schools and pharmacies, by the Paul-Ehrlich-Gesellschaft für Chemotherapie e. V. (PEG) in Frankfurt am Main, and the Paul-Ehrlich-Klinik in Bad Homburg vor der Höhe. The Paul Ehrlich and Ludwig Darmstaedter Prize is the most distinguished German award for biomedical research. A European network of PhD studies in Medicinal Chemistry has been named after him (Paul Ehrlich MedChem Euro PhD Network).

The Anti-Defamation League awards a Paul Ehrlich–Günther K. Schwerin Human Rights Prize.

A crater of the moon was named after Ehrlich in 1970.

=== Honours and titles ===
- 1882 Awarded the title of Professor
- 1890 Appointed Extraordinary Professor at the Friedrich-Wilhelms-Universität (now Humboldt University)
- 1896 Given the nonacademic Prussian title of a Medical Councillor (Geheimer Medizinalrat)
- 1903 Awarded Prussia's highest distinction in science, the Great Golden Medal of Science (which had previously been awarded only to Rudolf Virchow)
- 1904 Honorary professorship in Göttingen; honorary doctorate from the University of Chicago
- 1907 Granted the seldom-awarded title Senior Medical Councillor (Geheimer Obermedizinalrat); granted an honorary doctorate from Oxford University
- 1908 Awarded The Nobel Prize in Physiology or Medicine for his "work on immunity"
- 1911 Granted Prussia's highest civilian award, Privy Councillor (Wirklicher Geheimer Rat with the predicate "Excellency")
- 1912 Made an honorary citizen of the city of Frankfurt a.M. and of his birthplace Strehlen
- 1914 Awarded the Cameron Prize for Therapeutics of the University of Edinburgh
- 1914 Appointed full Professor of Pharmacology at the newly established Frankfurt University.

== See also ==
- Ehrlich's reagent
- List of German inventors and discoverers
- List of Jewish Nobel laureates
