= Walthard cell rest =

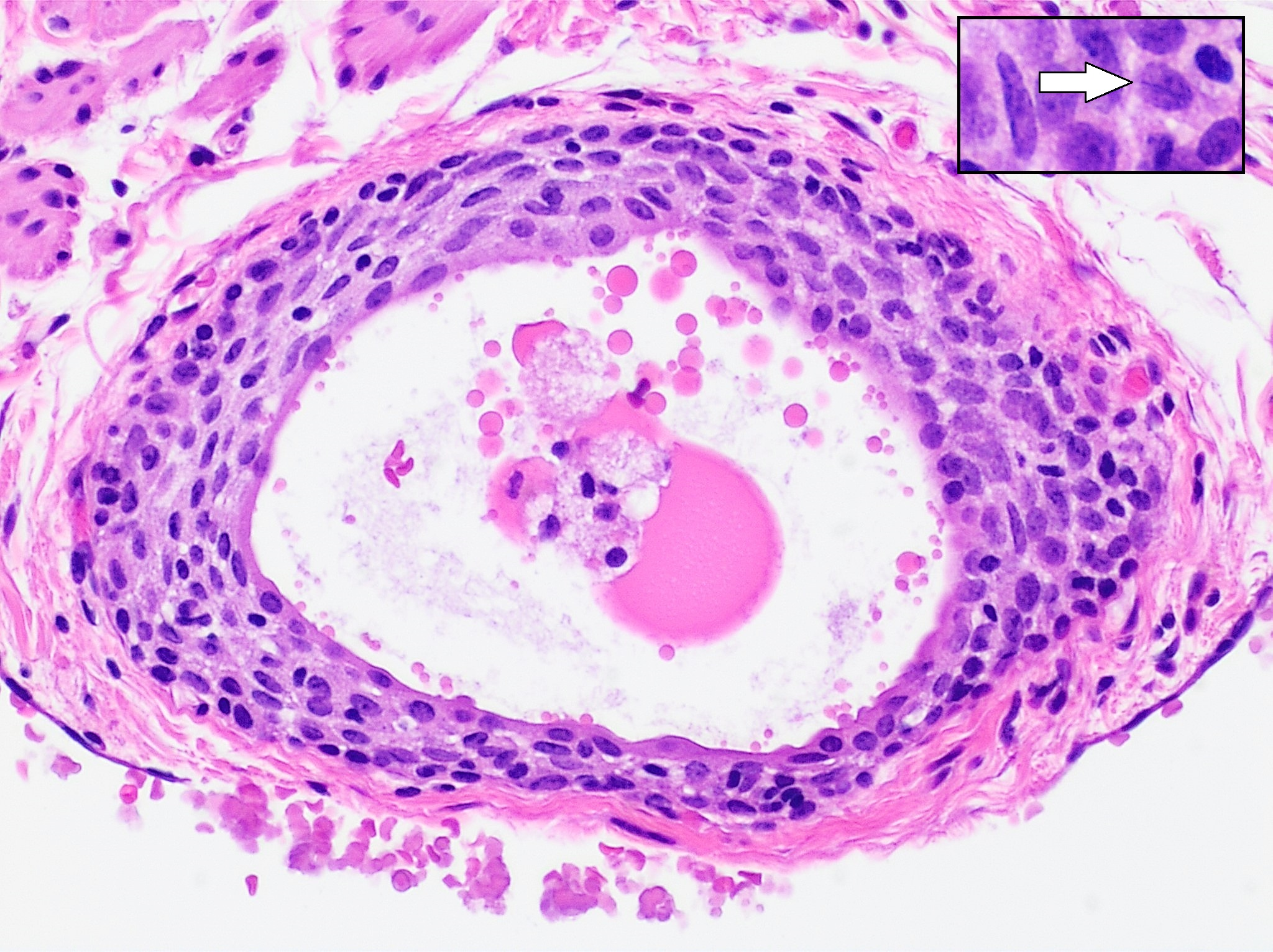
Histology of a Walthard cell rest in a fallopian tube with typical features (H&E stain): Cyst (may also be solid nest) of transitional type epithelium.; Eosinophilic luminal secretions.; Uniform nuclei with irregular borders and nuclear grooves (insert image).

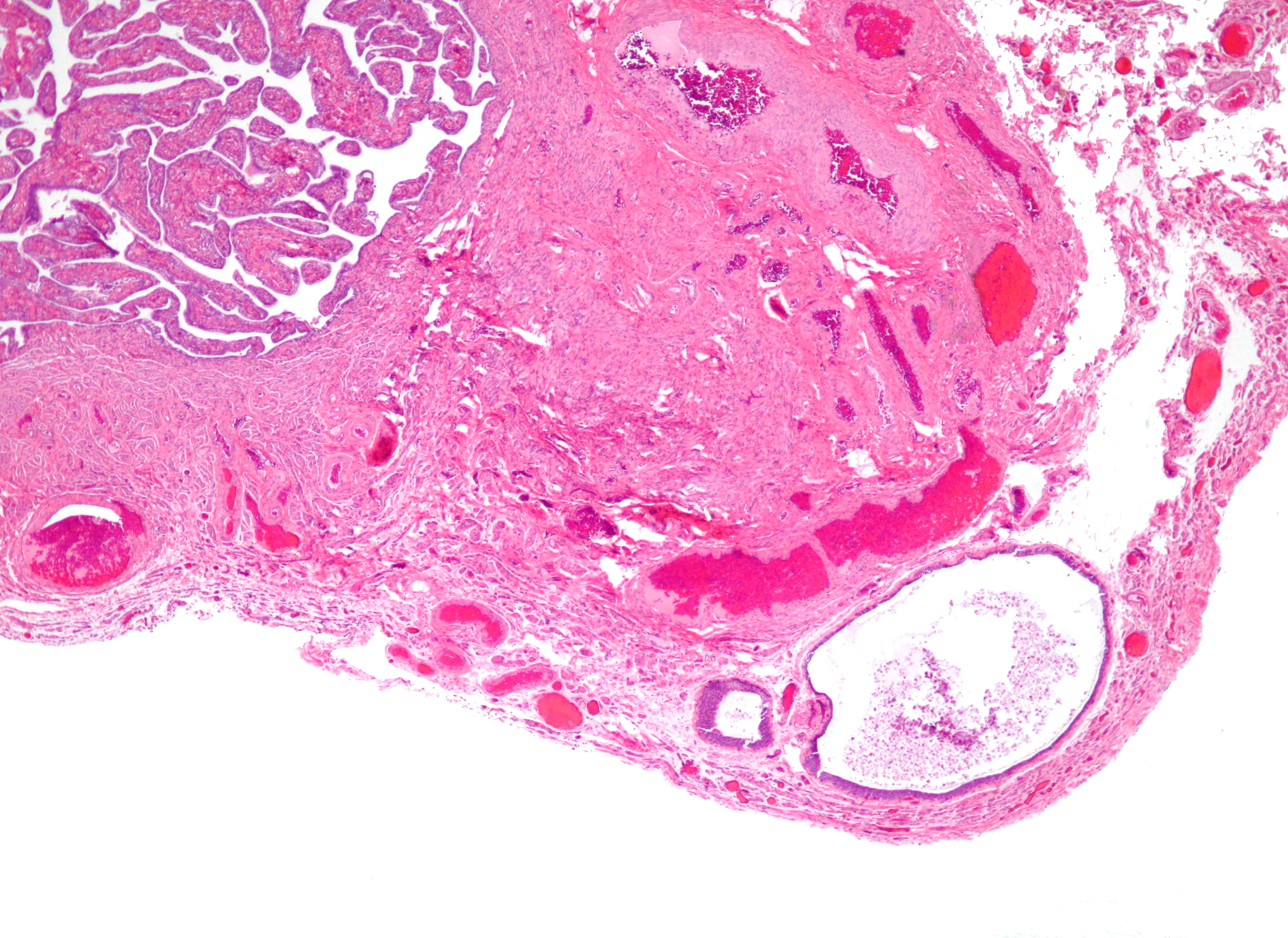
Micrograph of a cystic Walthard cell rest (lower right of image) within the connective tissue of a fallopian tube (tubal epithelium – upper left of image). H&E stain.

Walthard cell rests, sometimes called Walthard cell nests, are a benign cluster of epithelial cells most commonly found in the connective tissue of the fallopian tubes, but also seen in the mesovarium, mesosalpinx and ovarian hilus.

== Appearance ==
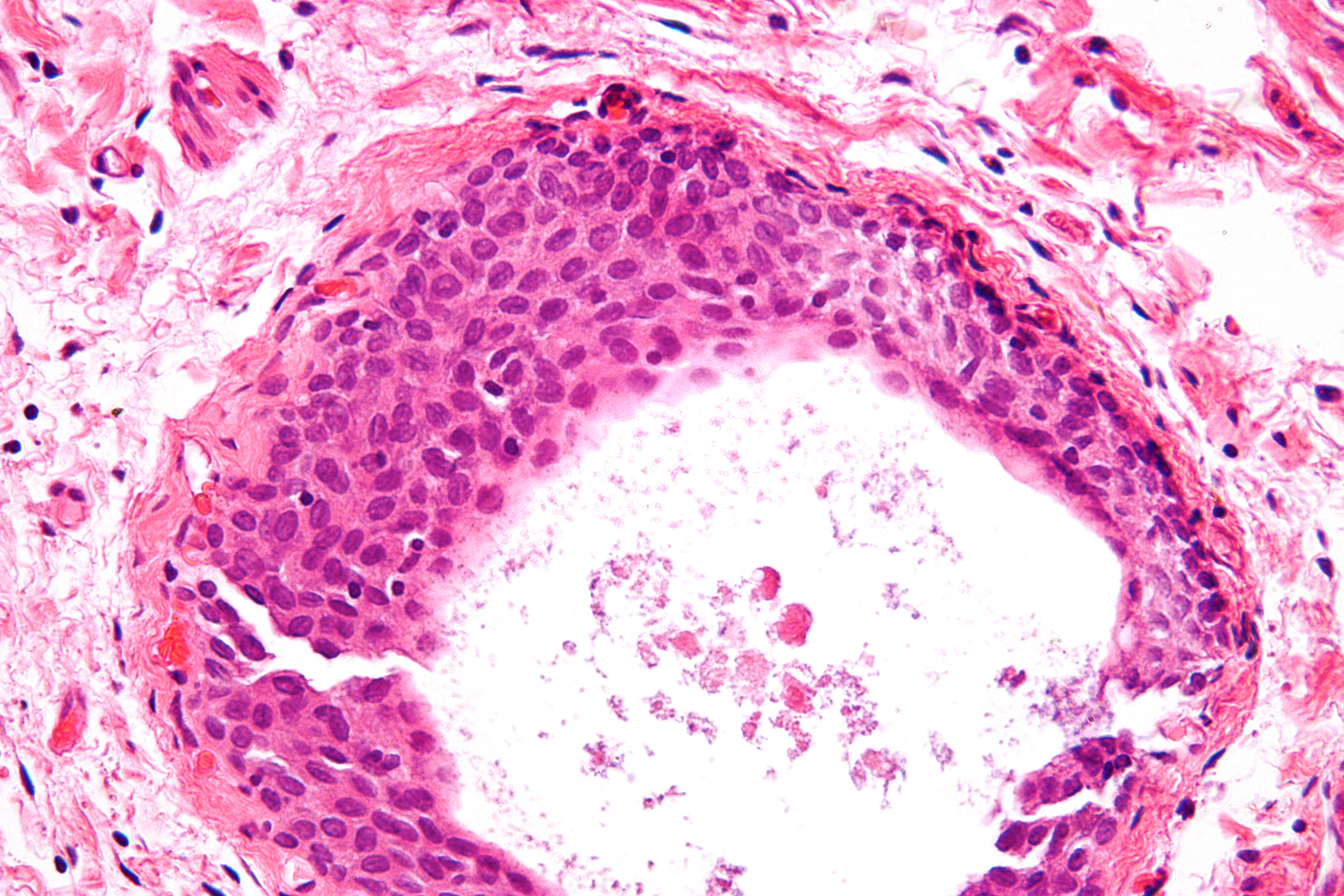
High magnification micrograph of a cystic Walthard cell rest showing the characteristic coffee bean-shaped nuclei. H&E stain.

They appear as white/yellow cysts or nodules that can reach a size of 2 millimeters. They typically have elliptical nuclei with a long groove (along the major axis) – so-called "coffee bean" nuclei.

== Pathology ==
It has been suggested that these cell rests are the histogenetic origins of Brenner tumors, due to the histological similarity of the epithelium of Walthard cell rests and Brenner tumors to the urothelium of the lower urinary tract. Also, it has been proposed that Brenner tumors and Walthard cell rests signify urothelial differentiation within the female genital tract.

== Eponym ==
They are named after Swiss gynecologist Max Walthard (1867–1933), who provided a comprehensive description of them in 1903.

== Additional images ==
High magnification micrograph of a Brenner tumor showing the characteristic coffee bean nuclei which are also seen in Walthard cell rests. H&E stain.
