= Ehrlich (crater) =

Crater on the Moon

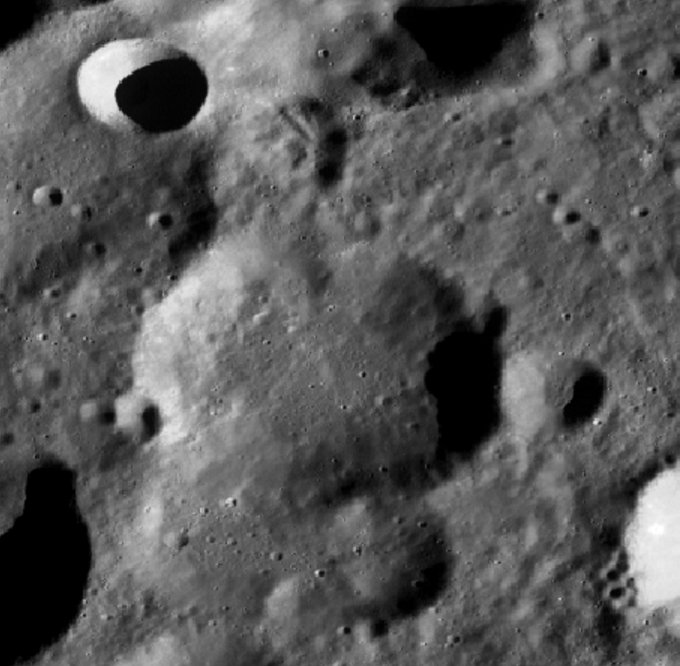
- LRO image
- Coordinates: 40.82°N 172.27°W
- Diameter: 33.58 km (20.87 mi)
- Depth: Unknown
- Colongitude: 173° at sunrise
- Formation: Nectarian
- Eponym: Paul Ehrlich

Ehrlich is a small lunar impact crater named after the German scientist Paul Ehrlich. It is located in the northern hemisphere on the Moon's far side. This formation lies within a rugged region that has been extensively bombarded by impacts of comparable size or smaller. Ehrlich lies about midway between the craters Parsons to the south and the heavily worn Guillaume to the north.

This formation dates to the Nectarian period on the lunar geologic timescale. It is a worn crater with features that have become softened and rounded due to bombardment. A pair of small craters are attached to the exterior along the southern rim. The interior floor and inner walls are nearly featureless and there are no impacts of note within the rim.

The crater was formally named by the International Astronomical Union in 1970 after German doctor and Nobel Laureate Paul Ehrlich (1854-1915).

== Satellite craters ==
By convention these features are identified on lunar maps by placing the letter on the side of the crater midpoint that is closest to Ehrlich.

| Ehrlich | Latitude | Longitude | Diameter |
|---|---|---|---|
| J | 40.2° N | 170.7° W | 25 km |
| N | 39.0° N | 173.1° W | 19 km |
| W | 42.7° N | 174.0° W | 26 km |
| Z | 42.2° N | 172.4° W | 28 km |
