= Arsphenamine =

Antibiotic drug introduced in the 1910s

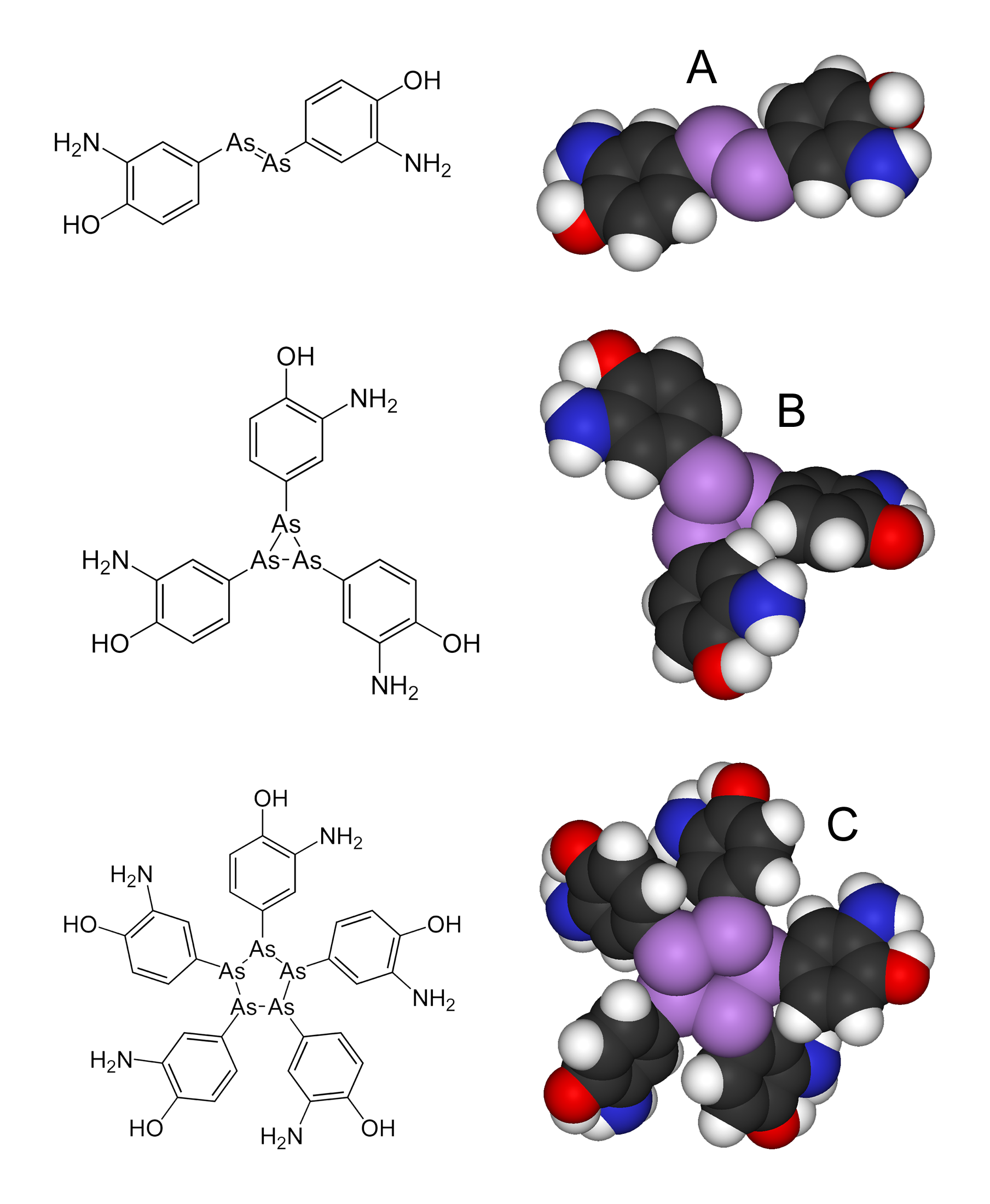
The structure of arsphenamine has been proposed to be akin to azobenzene (A). Salvarsan is now assumed to be a mixture of the trimer (B) and the pentamer (C).

Arsphenamine, also known as Salvarsan or compound 606, is an antibiotic drug that was introduced at the beginning of the 1910s as the first effective treatment for the deadly infectious diseases syphilis, relapsing fever, and African trypanosomiasis. This organoarsenic compound was the first modern antimicrobial agent.

== History ==
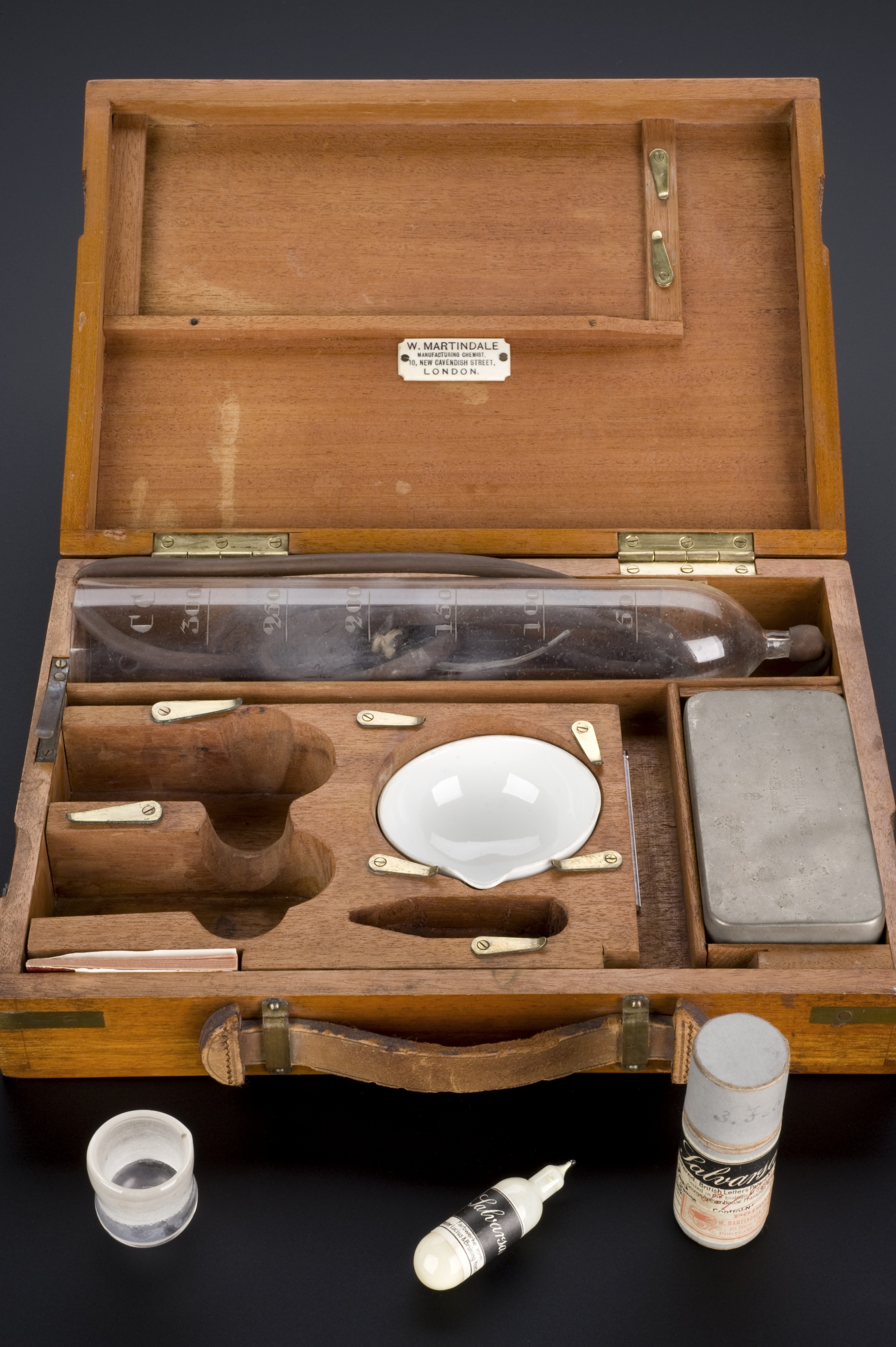
Salvarsan treatment kit for syphilis, Germany, 1909–1912

Arsphenamine was first synthesized in 1907 in Paul Ehrlich's lab by Alfred Bertheim. The antisyphilitic activity of this compound was discovered by Sahachiro Hata in 1909, during a survey of hundreds of newly synthesized organic arsenical compounds. Ehrlich had theorized that by screening many compounds, a drug could be discovered that would have anti-microbial activity but not kill the human patient. Ehrlich's team began their search for such a "magic bullet" among chemical derivatives of the dangerously toxic drug atoxyl.

Arsphenamine was used to treat the disease syphilis because it is toxic to the bacterium Treponema pallidum, a spirochete that causes syphilis.

Arsphenamine was originally called "606" because it was the sixth in the sixth group of compounds synthesized for testing; it was marketed by Hoechst AG under the trade name "Salvarsan" in 1910. Salvarsan was the first organic antisyphilitic, and a great improvement over the inorganic mercury compounds that had been used previously. It was distributed as a yellow, crystalline, hygroscopic powder that was highly unstable in air. This significantly complicated administration, as the drug had to be dissolved in several hundred milliliters of distilled, sterile water with minimal exposure to air to produce a solution suitable for injection. Some of the side effects attributed to Salvarsan, including rashes, liver damage, and risks of life and limb, were thought to be caused by improper handling and administration. This caused Ehrlich, who worked assiduously to standardize practices, to observe, "the step from the laboratory to the patient's bedside ... is extraordinarily arduous and fraught with danger."

Ehrlich's laboratory developed a more soluble (but slightly less effective) arsenical compound, Neosalvarsan (neoarsphenamine), which was easier to prepare, and it became available in 1912. Less severe side-effects such as nausea and vomiting were still common. An additional problem was that both Salvarsan and Neosalvarsan had to be stored in sealed vials under a nitrogen atmosphere to prevent oxidation. These arsenical compounds were supplanted as treatments for syphilis in the 1940s by penicillin.

After leaving Ehrlich's laboratory, Hata continued parallel investigation of the new medicines in Japan.

== Structure ==
Salvarsan has long been assumed to have an As=As double bond, akin to the N=N linkage in azobenzene. However, in 2005, in an extensive mass spectrometric analysis, the arsenic–arsenic bonds in Salvarsan were shown to be single bonds rather than double bonds. Presumed to consist of RAs=AsR molecules, i.e. (RAs)_{2}, Salvarsan was found to actually contain a mixture of cyclo-(RAs)_{3} and cyclo-(RAs)_{5} species, where R is the 3-amino-4-hydroxyphenyl moiety. According to Nicholson, these cyclic species slowly release an oxidised species, RAs(OH)_{2}, that is likely responsible for Salvarsan's antisyphilis properties.

== See also ==
- Arsenicin A, an organoarsenic molecule found in nature with similar activity
- Dr. Ehrlich's Magic Bullet, the 1940 film about Ehrlich's quest to find a cure for syphilis
