= Magic bullet (medicine) =

Concept in biology, precursor to chemotherapy

The magic bullet is a scientific concept developed by the German Nobel laureate Paul Ehrlich in 1907. While working at the Institute of Experimental Therapy (Institut für experimentelle Therapie), Ehrlich formed an idea that it could be possible to kill specific microbes (such as bacteria), which cause diseases in the body, without harming the body itself.

He named the hypothetical agent as Zauberkugel, and used the English translation "magic bullet" in The Harben Lectures at London. The name itself is a reference to an old German myth about a bullet that cannot miss its target. Ehrlich had in mind Carl Maria von Weber's popular 1821 opera Der Freischütz, in which a young hunter is required to hit an impossible target in order to marry his bride.

Ehrlich envisioned that just like a bullet fired from a gun to hit a specific target, there could be a way to specifically target invading microbes. His continued research to discover the magic bullet resulted in further knowledge of the functions of the body's immune system, and in the development of Salvarsan, the first effective drug for syphilis, in 1909. His works were the foundation of immunology, and for his contributions he shared the 1908 Nobel Prize in Physiology or Medicine with Élie Metchnikoff.

Ehrlich's discovery of Salvarsan in 1909 for the treatment of syphilis is known as the first magic bullet. This led to the foundation of the concept of chemotherapy.

== Background ==
=== Research on antibody ===
In the early 1890s, Paul Ehrlich started to work with Emil Behring, professor of medicine at the University of Marburg. Behring had been investigating antibacterial agents and discovered a diphtheria antitoxin (that is, antibodies that target a biological toxin produced by the diphtheria bacteria Corynebacterium diphtheriae). (For that discovery, Bering was the first recipient of the Nobel Prize in Physiology or Medicine in 1901. Ehrlich was also nominated for that year.) From Behring's work, Ehrlich understood that antibodies produced in the blood could attack invading pathogens without any harmful effect on the body. He speculated that these antibodies act as bullets fired from a gun to target specific microbes. But after further research, he realised that antibodies sometimes failed to kill microbes. This led him to abandon his first concept of the magic bullet.

=== Research on therapeutic properties of dyes ===
Ehrlich joined the Institute of Experimental Therapy (Institut für experimentelle Therapie) at Frankfurt am Main, Germany, in 1899, becoming the director of its research institute the Georg–Speyer Haus in 1906. Here his research focused on testing arsenical dyes for killing microbes. Arsenic was an infamous poison, and his attempt was criticised. He was publicly lampooned as an imaginary "Dr Phantasus". But Ehrlich's rationale was that the chemical structure called side chain forms antibodies that bind to toxins (such as pathogens and their products); similarly, chemical dyes such as arsenic compounds could also produce such side chains to kill the same microbes. This led him to propose a new concept called "side-chain theory". (Later in 1900, he revised his concept as "receptor theory".) Based on his new theory, he postulated that in order to kill microbes, "wir müssen chemisch zielen lernen" ("we have to learn how to aim chemically").

His institute was convenient as it was adjacent to a dye factory. He began testing a number of compounds against different microbes. It was during his research that he coined the terms "chemotherapy" and "magic bullet". Although he used the German word zauberkugel in his earlier writings, the first time he introduced the English term "magic bullet" was at a Harben Lecture in London in 1908. By 1901, with the help of Japanese microbiologist Kiyoshi Shiga, Ehrlich experimented with hundreds of dyes on mice infected with trypanosome, a protozoan parasite that causes sleeping sickness. In 1904 they successfully prepared a red azo dye they called Trypan Red for the treatment of sleeping sickness.

== Discovery of the first magic bullet – Salvarsan ==
In 1906 Ehrlich developed a new derivative of arsenic compound, which he code-named Compound 606 (the number representing the series of all his tested compounds). The compound was effective against malaria infection in experimental animals. In 1905, Fritz Schaudinn and Erich Hoffmann identified a spirochaete bacterium (Treponema pallidum) as the causative organism of syphilis. With this new knowledge, Ehrlich tested Compound 606 (chemically arsphenamine) on a syphilis-infected rabbit. He did not recognise its effectiveness. Sahachiro Hata went over Ehrlich's work and found on 31 August 1909 that the rabbit, which had been injected with Compound 606, was cured using only a single dose, the rabbit showing no adverse effect.

The normal treatment procedure of syphilis at the time involved two to four years routine injection with mercury. Ehrlich, after receiving this information, performed experiments on human patients with the same success. After convincing clinical trials, the compound number 606 was given the trade name "Salvarsan", a portmanteau for "saving arsenic". Salvarsan was commercially introduced in 1910, and in 1913, a less toxic form, "Neosalvarsan" (Compound 914), was released in the market. These drugs became the principal treatments of syphilis until the arrival of penicillin and other novel antibiotics towards the middle of the 20th century.

Ehrlich created the concept of a magic bullet based on the development of arsphenamine and introduced the English phrase "magic bullet" in The Harben Lectures for 1907 of the Royal Institute of Public Health at London. However, he had used the German word Zauberkugel in his earlier works on the side-chain theory. The magic bullet became the foundation of modern pharmaceutical research.

== Cultural reference ==
Magic Bullets, an abridged version of the 1940 film Dr. Ehrlich's Magic Bullet, was created for educational campaigns of the United States Public Health Service

A biographical film about Ehrlich titled Dr. Ehrlich's Magic Bullet was made in 1940 by Warner Bros. It was directed by William Dieterle and starred Edward G. Robinson. The US Public Health Service adopted an abridged version of the film as Magic Bullets for educational campaigns.

Critics of the Warren Commission's investigation of the John F. Kennedy assassination refer to the single-bullet theory as the "Magic Bullet Theory" for the counterintuitively complex and precise way a single bullet is proposed to have caused multiple injuries in Kennedy and Texas Governor John Connally.
