= Wiechert =

Wiechert is a German surname. Notable people with the surname include:

- Emil Wiechert (1861–1928), German physicist and geophysicist
- Ernst Wiechert (1887–1950), German teacher, poet, and writer
- Hedwig Keppelhoff-Wiechert (born 1939), German politician

== See also ==
- Weichert (surname)
