= Neosalvarsan =

Names
- Other names Sodium 3,3'-diamino-4,4'-dihydroxyarsenobenzene-N-formaldehydesulfoxylate; Neoarsphenamine;914

Identifiers
CAS Number	457-60-3
3D model (JSmol)	Interactive image
ChemSpider	9586
ECHA InfoCard	100.006.613
PubChem CID	9980
UNII	O7K7R0O4BG
CompTox Dashboard (EPA)	DTXSID60196599
- InChI: InChI=1S/C13H14As2N2O4S.Na/c16-10-5-8(1-3-12(10)18)14-15-9-2-4-13(19)11(6-9)17-7-22(20)21;/h1-6,17-19H,7,16H2,(H,20,21);/q;+1/p-1 Key: BGYSJUFVJUJSOL-UHFFFAOYSA-M; InChI=1/C13H14As2N2O4S.Na/c16-10-5-8(1-3-12(10)18)14-15-9-2-4-13(19)11(6-9)17-7-22(20)21;/h1-6,17-19H,7,16H2,(H,20,21);/q;+1/p-1 Key: BGYSJUFVJUJSOL-REWHXWOFAO
- SMILES: [Na+].[O-]S(=O)CNc2cc(/[As]=[As]/c1ccc(O)c(N)c1)ccc2O

Properties
Chemical formula	C_{13}H_{13}As_{2}N_{2}NaO_{4}S
Molar mass	466.15 g/mol
- Except where otherwise noted, data are given for materials in their standard state (at 25 °C [77 °F], 100 kPa). verify (what is ?) Infobox references

Neosalvarsan (also known as neoarsphenamine) is a synthetic chemotherapeutic that is an organoarsenic compound. It became available in 1912 and superseded the more toxic and less water-soluble Salvarsan as an effective treatment for syphilis. Because both of these arsenicals carried considerable risk of side effects, they were replaced for this indication by penicillin in the 1940s.

Both Salvarsan and Neosalvarsan were developed in the laboratory of Paul Ehrlich in Frankfurt, Germany. Their discoveries were the result of the first organized team effort to optimize the biological activity of a lead compound through systematic chemical modifications. This scheme is the basis for most modern pharmaceutical research. Both Salvarsan and Neosalvarsan are prodrugs – that is, they are metabolised into the active drug in the body.

Although, like Salvarsan, it was originally believed to contain an arsenic-arsenic double bond, this is now known to be incorrect for Salvarsan. Presumably, Neosalvarsan also exists as a mixture of differently sized rings with arsenic-arsenic single bonds.
