= Weichert =

Weichert is a surname. Notable people with the surname include:

- Dieter Weichert (born 1948), German mechanical engineer
- Florian Weichert (born 1968), German footballer
- Konrad Weichert (1934–2003), German sailor

== See also ==
- Weigert (disambiguation)
- Wiechert (surname)
