= Karl Weigert =

German Jewish pathologist

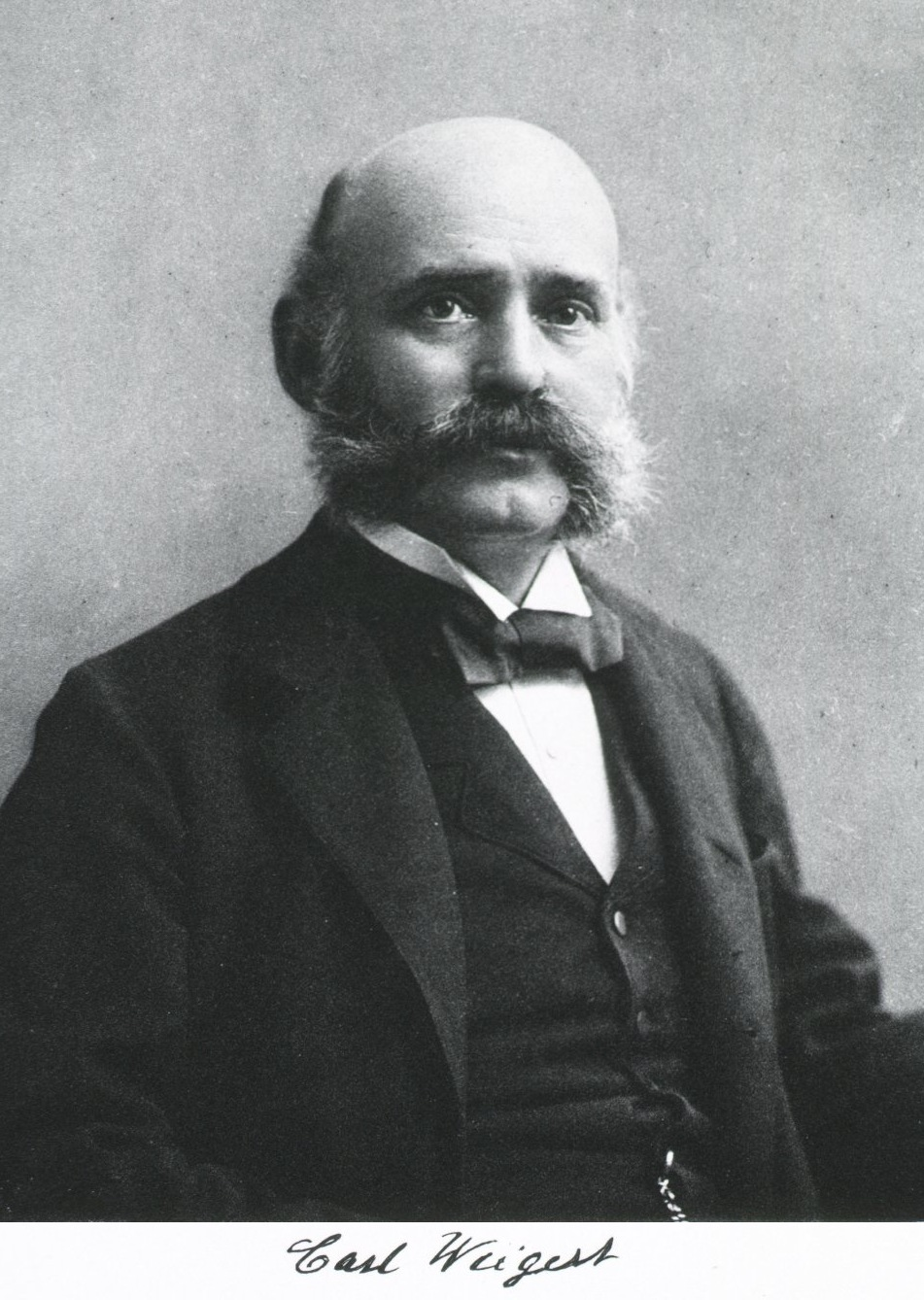
- Born: 19 March 1845; Münsterberg, Silesia
- Died: 5 August 1904 (aged 59); Frankfurt am Main
- Other name: Carl Weigert
- Education: universities of Berlin, Vienna, Breslau
- Occupation: pathologist
- Known for: staining of bacteria in microscopy
- Notable work: discovery of vascular tuberculosis
- Relatives: Fritz Weigert (nephew); Paul Ehrlich (cousin)

Karl Weigert, Carl Weigert (19 March 1845 in Münsterberg in Silesia – 5 August 1904 in Frankfurt am Main) was a German Jewish pathologist. His nephew was Fritz Weigert and his cousin was Paul Ehrlich.

He received his education at the universities of Berlin, Vienna, and Breslau, graduating in 1868. After having taken part in the Franco-Prussian War as assistant surgeon, he settled in Breslau, and for the following two years, was an assistant to Heinrich Waldeyer; from 1870 to 1874 to Hermann Lebert, and then to Julius Cohnheim, who he followed to the University of Leipzig in 1878. There he became an associate professor of pathology in 1879. In 1884, he was appointed professor of pathological anatomy at the Senckenbergsche Stiftung in Frankfurt am Main, and received the title of "Geheimer Medizinal-Rat" in 1899. He is buried in Old Jewish Cemetery, Frankfurt (Juedischer Friedhof Rat-Beil-Straße).

Weigert assisted Cohnheim in many of his researches, and wrote much on the staining of bacteria in microscopy. In 1884, he introduced a precise method for staining myelin sheaths. He is credited with the discovery of vascular tuberculosis, and was the first to demonstrate how tuberculous material could enter the bloodstream.

He contributed many essays to medical journals. Among his works are:

- "Zur Anatomie der Pocken" (Breslau, 1874)
- "Färbung der Bacterien mit Anilinfarben" (ib. 1875)
- "Nephritis" (Leipzig, 1879)
- "Fibrinfärbung" (1886)
- "Beiträge zur Kenntniss der Normalen Menschlichen Neuroglia" (Frankfort am Main, 1895)
- "Elastische Fasern" (ib. 1898)

== Weiger–Meyer law ==
The Weigert–Meyer law describes the anatomical relationship of two ureters in a duplicated renal collecting system, as well as the resulting patterns of hydronephrosis, obstruction, and reflux. This pattern was first described by Weigert in 1877 and further defined as a "law" by Dr. Robert Meyer in 1946.

== Bibliography ==
- Pagel, J. L., Biog. Lex. s.v., Vienna, 1901;
- Oesterreichische Wochenschrift, 1904, pp. 533, 534
