= Side-chain theory =

Generally accepted theory published in 1900 to explain immune response in living cells

The side-chain theory (German, Seitenkettentheorie) is a theory proposed by Paul Ehrlich (1854–1915) to explain the immune response in living cells. Ehrlich theorized from very early in his career that chemical structure could be used to explain why the immune response occurred in reaction to infection. He believed that toxins and antitoxins were chemical substances at a time when very little was known about their nature. The theory explains the interaction of antibodies and antigens in the blood, and how antibodies are produced.

== History ==
In 1891, Paul Ehrlich joined the newly established Robert Koch Institute in Berlin upon the invitation of Robert Koch himself. By 1896 a new branch, the Institute for Serum Research and Testing (Institut für Serumforschung und Serumprüfung), was established in Frankfurt with Ehrlich as its founding director. He worked on antitoxins for diphtheria and their binding to antibodies in the blood. He hypothesised that antibodies bind to antigens through special chemical structures that he called "side chains" (which he later named "receptors"). Borrowing a concept used by Emil Fischer in 1894 to explain the interaction between an enzyme and its substrate, Ehrlich proposed that binding of the receptor to an infectious agent was like the fit between a lock and key. He published the first part of his side-chain theory in 1897, and its full form in 1900 in a lecture he delivered to the Royal Society in London.

== Postulate ==
Ehrlich's theory can be summarised with the following tenets:

1. Antibodies are produced by white blood cells normally and they act as side chains (receptors) on the cell membrane.
2. Antibody specificity exists for specific interaction with a given antigen.
3. Antigen–antibody interaction occurs by precise binding through the side chains.

== Concept ==
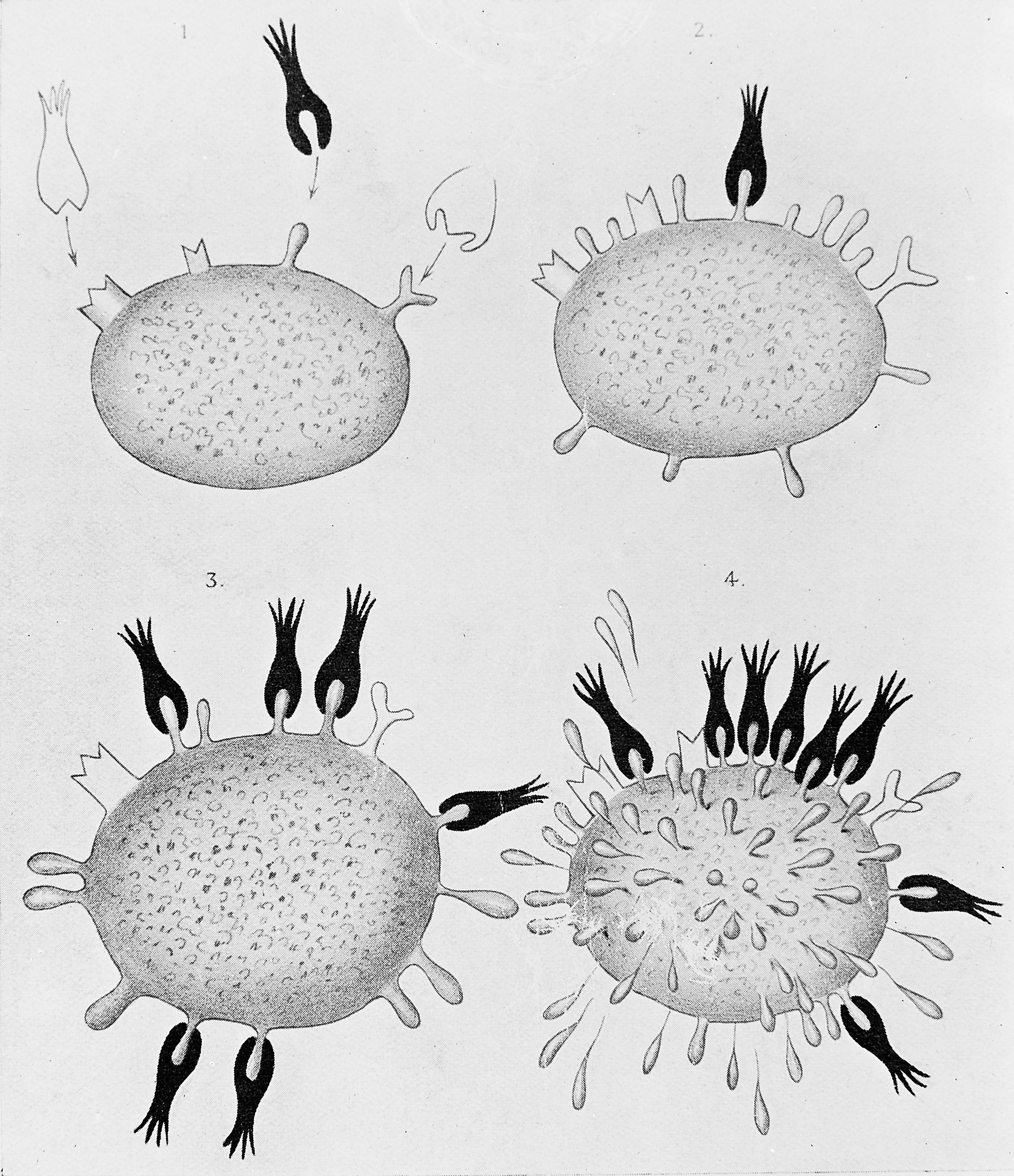

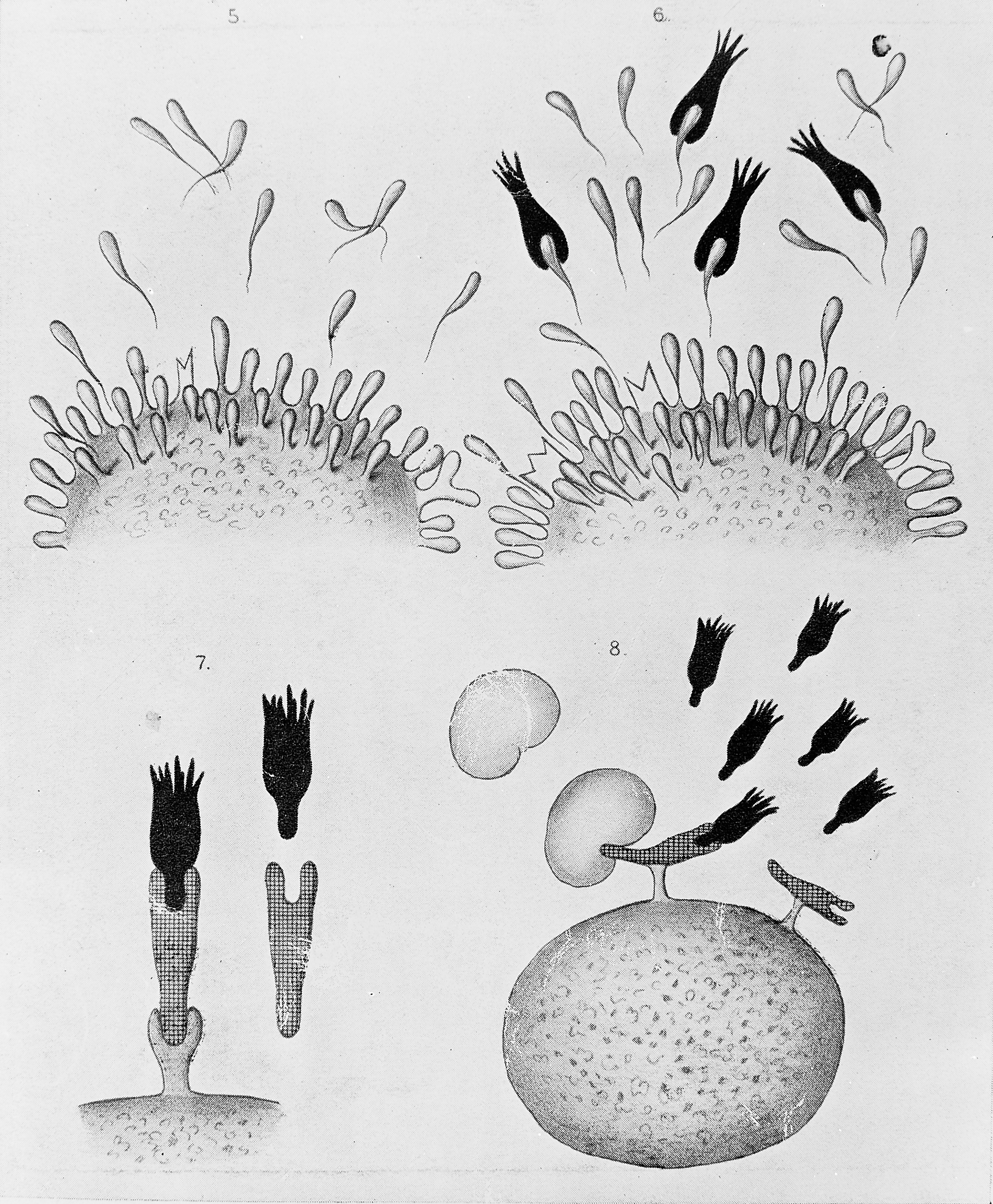

Ehrlich supposed that living cells have side chains in the same way dyes have side chains which are related to their coloring properties. These side chains can link with a particular toxin (or any antigen), just as Emil Fischer said enzymes must bind to their receptors "as lock and key."

Ehrlich theorised that a cell under threat grew additional side chains to bind the toxin, and that these additional side chains broke off to become the antibodies that are circulated through the body. According to this theory, the surface of white blood cells is covered with many side chains that form chemical links with the antigens. For any given antigen, at least one of these side chains would bind, stimulating the cell to produce more of the same type, which would then be liberated into the blood stream as antibodies. According to Ehrlich, an antibody could be considered an irregularly shaped, microscopic, three-dimensional label that would bind to a specific antigen but not to the other cells of the organism. It was these antibodies that Ehrlich first described as "magic bullets", agents that specifically target toxins or pathogens without harming the body.

Ehrlich suggested that interaction between an infectious agent and a cell-bound receptor would induce the cell to produce and release more receptors with the same specificity. According to Ehrlich’s theory, the specificity of the receptor was determined before its exposure to antigen, and the antigen selected the appropriate receptor. Ultimately all aspects of Ehrlich's theory would be proven correct with the minor exception that the "receptor" exists as both a soluble antibody molecule and as a cell-bound receptor; it is the soluble form that is secreted rather than the bound form released.
