= Weigert–Meyer law =

Urology

The Weigert–Meyer law is a concept in urology and radiology that describes the anatomical relationship of two ureters in a duplicated renal collecting system, as well as the resulting patterns of hydronephrosis, obstruction, and reflux.

In most cases, the upper renal moiety drains to the more medial ureteral orifice and the lower renal moiety tends to drain to the more lateral orifice. The lower moiety often has a shorter muscular tunnel through the bladder wall due to the more lateral insertion, and is therefore more likely to reflux. The upper moiety has higher risk of obstruction due to greater likelihood of ureterocele or ectopic insertion.

This pattern was first described by German pathologist Dr. Karl Weigert in 1877. This was further investigated by German pathologist Dr. Robert Meyer, who described it as a "rule" in 1946.
