= Fritz Weigert =

German physical chemist (1876–1947)

Fritz Weigert (18 September 1876 – 13 April 1947) was a German physical chemist. Weigert has made major contributions in the field of photochemistry. He was born in Berlin. He was the nephew of both Karl Weigert and Paul Ehrlich. He was married to Margarete Behmer. Around 1908, he began teaching and conducting research at Berlin University - after studying there. He was a photochemistry professor at Leipzig University from 1914 until being, like other Jewish scientists, forced out by the Nazis in 1934. On January 1, 1935, he immigrated to England and in 1936 was director of the Physiochemical Department of the Cancer Research Institute at Mount Vernon Hospital, Northwood.

He elucidated the metabolism of the carcinogenic hydrocarbon 3,4-benzpyrene by fluorescence spectroscopy.

== Works ==
- (1899) Zur Kenntnis des aus γ-Chlorbutyronitril entstehenden Körpers C₈H₁₀S₃:Inaugural-Dissertation zur Erlangung der Doctorwürde von der philosophischen Facultät der Friedrich-Wilhelms-Universität zu Berlin genehmigt und nebst den beigefügten Thesen öffentlich zu verteidigen am 28. Juni 1899/ Berlin,A.W. Schade's Buchdruckerei,1899.
- (1901) About the sulfurized dibutolactone, Reports of the German Chemical Society
- (1903), Ueber organische Synthesen mittels Kohlenoxysulfid. Ber. Dtsch. Chem. Ges., 36: 1007–1013. doi:10.1002/cber.190303601208
- (1905) About reversible photochemical reactions in the homogeneous system
- (1908) About Chemical Light Effects
- (1911), Die chemischen Wirkungen des Lichts (The Chemical Effects of Light)
- (1913) About the activation of oxygen by radiation, Reports of the German Chemical Society
- (1919), A new effect of radiation in photosensitive layers
- (1916), Über Absorptionsspektren und über eine einfache Methode zu ihrer quantitativen Bestimmung. Ber. Dtsch. Chem. Ges., 49: 1496–1532. doi:10.1002/cber.191604901176
- (1917) About real photochemical processes. Zeitschrift für Physikalische Chemie, Volume 130U, Issue 1, Pages 607–615, ISSN (Online) 2196–7156, ISSN (Print) 0942–9352, doi: 10.1515/zpch-1927-13065.
- (1920), Über die spezifische Wirkung der polarisierten Strahlung. Ann. Phys., 368: 681–725. doi:10.1002/andp.19203682402
- (1921) Weigert, F. Pflügers Arch. 190: 177. https://doi.org/10.1007/BF01723387
- (1921) Weigert, F. Z. Physik. Über einen neuen Effekt der Strahlung 5: 410. https://doi.org/10.1007/BF01327678
- (1923) On the photochemistry of chlorine. Journal of Physical Chemistry
- (1924) About the polarization state of the resonance radiation and about its influence by weak magnetic fields. Polarisierte Fluoreszenz in Farbstofflösungen Zeitschrift für Physik, Volume 25, Number 1, Page 99-117
- (1927) Optische Methoden der Chemie (Optical Methods of Chemistry)
- (1927) About the mechanism of photochemical polymerization of anthracene. Natural Sciences
- (1929) Photochemical to the theory of color vision. Zeitschrift für Physikalische Chemie, Volume 3B, Issue 1, Pages 377–388, ISSN (Online) 2196–7156, ISSN (Print) 0942–9352, doi: /10.1515/zpch-1929-0328.
- (1929) About monochromatic light filters.
- (1930) Color-ability, a new property of the latent photographic image. Natural Sciences
- (1933) The Colloid Chemistry of Photoanisotrophy
- (1940) Photochemical Studies on Color Vision
- Berenblum and Halban, in: Nature, no. 159 (1947), 733.
