= Sahachiro Hata =

Japanese bacteriologist (1873–1938)

Sahachirō Hata
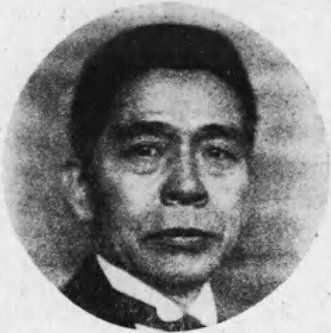
- Born: March 23, 1873; Masuda, Shimane, Japan
- Died: November 22, 1938 (aged 65); Tokyo, Japan
- Education: Okayama University
- Known for: Arsphenamine
- Scientific career
- Fields: Bacteriology; Chemotherapy
- Workplaces: Kitasato Institute

Sahachirō Hata (秦 佐八郎, Hata Sahachirō; March 23, 1873 – November 22, 1938) was a prominent Japanese bacteriologist who researched the bubonic plague under Kitasato Shibasaburō and assisted in developing the antisyphilitic drug arsphenamine in 1909 in the laboratory of Paul Ehrlich.

Hata received three unsuccessful nominations for the Nobel Prize, one from Swiss surgeon Emil Kocher for Chemistry in 1911 and two by Japanese colleagues Hayazo Ito and G Osawa for Physiology or Medicine in 1912 and 1913, respectively.

== Early life ==
Hata was born in Tsumo Village, Shimane prefecture (now part of Masuda City) as the eighth son of the Yamane family. At the age of 14, he was adopted by the Hata family, whose male members were doctors from generation to generation. Hata completed his medical education in Okayama at the Third Higher School of Medicine (now Okayama University School of Medicine). In 1897, he became an assistant at Okayama Prefectural Hospital where he learned internal medicine from Zenjiro Inoue and biochemistry from Torasaburo Araki.

== Plague research ==
Sahachiro Hata researched bubonic plague with Japanese bacteriologist and physician, Kitasato Shibasaburō, who co-discovered the infectious agent, a bacterium now called Yersinia pestis. Hata worked as an assistant for Kitasato and conducted research into the prevention of plague and other epidemic diseases. Hata helped formulate the "Communicable Disease Prevention Law," which was enacted in 1897 as the first legal framework for disease control in Japan. Among other things the law mandated reporting of certain disease to a public health agency in service of their control.

== Finding the 'magic bullet' for syphilis ==
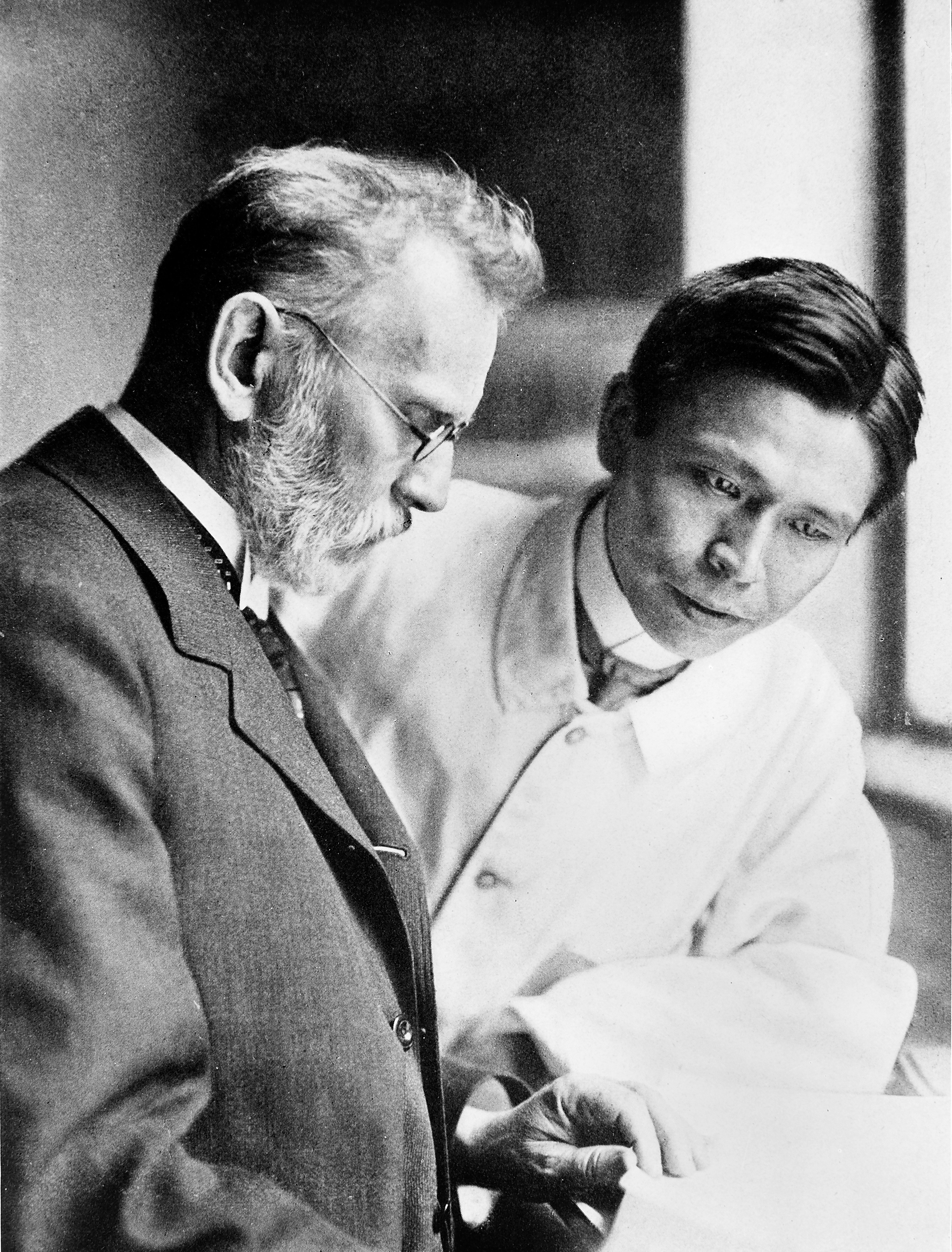
Sahachiro Hata and Paul Ehrlich search for the 'magic bullet' for syphilis.

In 1909, Sahachiro Hata went to work in Paul Ehrlich's laboratory, the National Institute for Experimental Therapeutics, in Frankfurt, Germany to help Ehrlich in his quest to develop a treatment for syphilis called the 'magic bullet.' The causative agent of syphilis was discovered to be the spirochete Treponema pallidum by Fritz Schaudinn and Erich Hoffmann in 1905. Syphilis was initially treated by topical-application or ingestion of mercury, which was very toxic. However, arsenical compounds had proven to be effective against trypanosomes, which are similar to spirochetes, so Ehrlich directed Hata to screen all of the known synthetic arsenic derivatives for antisyphilitic properties.

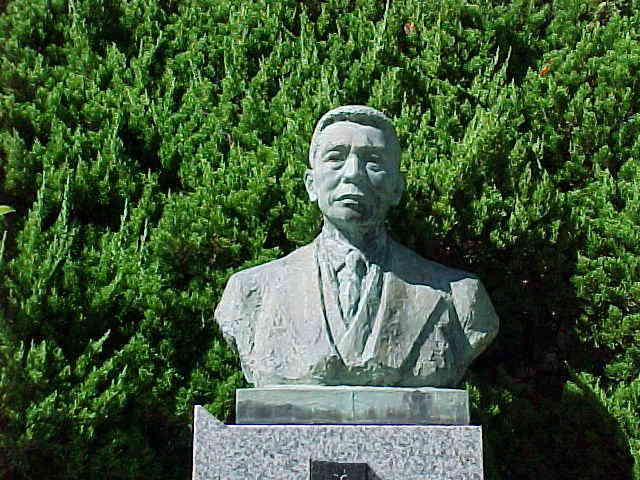
Bronze bust of Sahachiro Hata at the Hata Memorial Museum in Masuda City, Shimane prefecture

When Hata injected compound 606, arsphenamine, into rabbits infected with syphilis, he found it to be effective against syphilis in vivo. It was called compound 606 because it was the sixth in the sixth group of compounds synthesized for testing by Ehrlich and Hata. Arsphenamine was first thought to be ineffective when it was tested by Ehrlich's former assistants, so their inadequate methods were blamed for the delay of this important discovery.

At the Congress for Internal Medicine at Wiesbaden in April 1910, Ehrlich and Hata shared their successful clinical results, which showed that arsphenamine treated syphilis in humans. The drug was marketed under the name Salvarsan and gained international acclaim as the "arsenic that saves" and as the first man-made antibiotic. In the wake of their discovery, some sections of European society condemned Hata's and Ehrlich's 'magic bullet' because they believed that syphilis was a divine punishment for sin and immoral acts, and thus the infected did not deserve to be cured.

Before Salvarsan, drugs were not made to target specific diseases, like in the case of mercury treatments. Therefore, Hata's and Ehrlich's work represents a turning point for experimental and therapeutic pharmacology and paved the way for the development of antibiotics decades later. Salvarsan was established as the standard treatment for syphilis until it was replaced by the antibiotic penicillin after World War II, which has fewer adverse side effects.

Hata returned to Japan and became the leading bacteriologist of his generation and continued his work testing arsphenamine against syphilis. Hata became a director at the Kitasato Institute, and he also lectured at Keio University. In 1927, he was elected a member of the Academy of Sciences Leopoldina.
