= Robert Meyer (pathologist) =

German pathologist (1864–1947)

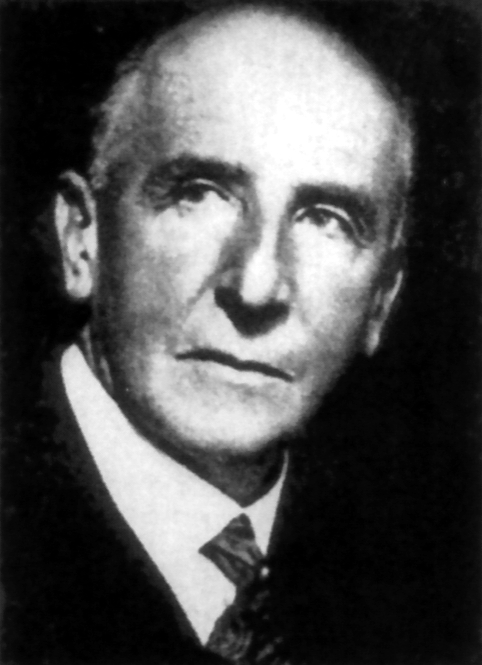
Robert Meyer

Robert Meyer (11 January 1864, in Hanover – 12 December 1947, in Minneapolis) was a German pathologist.

He studied medicine at the universities of Leipzig, Heidelberg and Strassburg, receiving his doctorate at the latter institution in 1889. From 1890 to 1894 he was a medical practitioner in the community of Dedeleben, and afterwards worked as assistant to gynecologist Johann Veit in Berlin.

From 1909 to 1911 he was head of the laboratory in the women's clinic at the Berlin Charité, and in 1912 succeeded Carl Arnold Ruge as chief of the pathological institute of the university women's clinic. In 1932 he became an honorary professor to the faculty of medicine at the university. Because of his Jewish ancestry, he was removed from his position at Berlin in 1935. Subsequently, he emigrated to the United States, settling in Minneapolis in 1939.

He is remembered for his research involving the embryology and histopathology of the reproductive system. He held a particular interest in embryonic tissue anomalies.

Within the field of urology, he defined the "Weigert–Meyer law". This law describes the typical anatomical relationship of two ureters in a duplicated renal collecting system, as well as the resulting patterns of hydronephrosis, obstruction, and reflux. This pattern was first described by Dr. Karl Weigert in 1877 and further defined as a "law" by Meyer in 1946.

== Associated works ==
- Über epitheliale Gebilde im Myometrium des fötalen und kindlichen Uterus, 1899.
- Studien zur Pathologie der Entwicklung, with Ernst Schwalbe (2 volumes 1914–20).
- "Autobiography of Dr. Robert Meyer (1864-1947); a short abstract of a long life". With a memoir of Dr. Meyer by Emil Novak, 1949.
