= Fowler (surname) =

Fowler is an English and/or Scots surname. Its origin is the Old English fugelere, an occupational name for a bird-catcher or hunter of wild birds. Old English fugel or fugol means "bird" and has evolved into the modern word fowl.

== Notable Fowlers ==
=== Born before 1700 ===
- Constance Aston Fowler (born "Constance Aston"), English author and anthologist
- Edward Fowler (1632–1714), English churchman, Bishop of Gloucester
- Eliza Haywood (born "Elizabeth Fowler" 1693–1756), English writer, actress and publisher
- Richard Fowler (c.1425–1477) - Chancellor of the Exchequer to Edward IV
- Thomas Fowler, (d. 1590), steward of the Countess of Lennox, and spy
- William Fowler (c. 1560–1612), Scottish poet, writer, courtier, and translator

=== Born after 1700 ===
- Charles Fowler (1792–1867), English architect
- John Fowler (1755–1840), American national politician
- Robert Fowler (1724–1801), Archbishop of Dublin in the Church of Ireland
- Robert Fowler (1767–1841), his son, Bishop of Ossory in the Church of Ireland
- Robert Merrick Fowler (1778–c1850), Royal Navy officer
- Samuel Fowler, New Jersey Congressman from 1833 to 1837
- Thomas Fowler (1777–1843), English inventor
- William Chauncey Fowler (1793–1881), American scholar, son-in-law and assistant to Noah Webster

=== Born after 1800 ===
- Alfred Fowler (1868–1940), English astronomer
- Bertha Fowler (1866–1952), American educator, preacher, deaconess
- Beryl Fowler (1881–1963), English painter
- Charles A. Fowler (1832–1896), American lawyer and politician
- Charles Henry Fowler (1837–1908), Canadian-American Bishop of the Methodist Episcopal Church
- C. Hodgson Fowler (1840–1910), English ecclesiastical architect
- Charles N. Fowler (1852–1932), American national politician
- Edmund John Fowler (1861–1926), Irish soldier, Victoria Cross recipient
- Edward Brush Fowler (1826–1896), American soldier
- Francis George Fowler (1871–1918), English writer on English language, grammar and usage
- Frank Fowler (1852–1910), American artist
- Frank Oliver Fowler (1861–1945), Canadian politician from Manitoba
- George Fowler (1839–1896), South Australian politician
- George Herbert Fowler (1861–1840), English zoologist
- George William Fowler (1859–1924), Canadian politician and lawyer
- Harriet Putnam Fowler (1842–1901), American writer
- Hec Fowler (1892–1987), Canadian ice hockey and soccer player
- Henry Fowler, 1st Viscount Wolverhampton (1830–1911), English politician
- Sir Henry Fowler, (1870–1938) English locomotive engineer
- Henry Fowler (died 1896), one of a pair of Victorian murderers, known as Milsom and Fowler
- Henry Watson Fowler (1858–1933), English schoolmaster, lexicographer and commentator on the usage of English
- Henry Weed Fowler (1878–1965), American zoologist
- Jack Fowler, (1899–1975), Welsh footballer
- Jack Beresford Fowler, (1893–1972), Australian theatre director
- Jesse Fowler (1898–1973), American baseball player
- Sir John Fowler, 1st Baronet (1817–1898), English railway engineer
- John Fowler (1826–1864), English agricultural engineer
- John Edgar Fowler (1866–1930), American politician
- Joseph S. Fowler (1820–1902), American politician
- Lilian Fowler (1886–1954), Australian politician
- Lydia Folger Fowler (1823–1879), American physician, activist, and professor of medicine
- Orson Squire Fowler (1809–1887), American phrenologist
- Ralph H. Fowler (1889–1944), English mathematical physicist
- Sir Robert Fowler, 1st Baronet (1828–1891), Lord Mayor of London
- Robert Fowler (1882–after 1981), Newfoundland-born marathon runner
- Robert G. Fowler (1884–1966), American aviation pioneer
- Robert Henry Fowler (1857–1957), Irish cricketer
- Robert St Leger Fowler (1891–1925), Irish cricketer
- Samuel Fowler (1851–1919), American politician from New Jersey
- J. Samuel Fowler (1874–1961), American politician from New York
- Thomas Fowler (1832–1904), Vice-Chancellor of the University of Oxford
- William Henry Fowler (1854–1932), founder of Fowler's Calculators
- William Warde Fowler (1847–1921), English historian and ornithologist
- William Weekes Fowler (1849–1923), entomologist

=== Born after 1900 ===
- Alan Fowler (1911–1944), English footballer
- Art Fowler (1922–2007), American baseball player and coach
- Bernie Fowler (1924–2021), American politician
- Bobby Jack Fowler (1939–2006), American criminal
- Bobby Fowler (born 1960), American football player
- Boob Fowler (1900–1988), American baseball player
- Bruce Fowler (born 1947), American trombonist and composer
- Calvin Fowler (1940–2013), American basketball player
- Cary Fowler (born 1949), American agricultural conservationist
- Catherine S. Fowler (born 1940), American anthropologist
- Daphne Fowler (born 1939), English quiz show champion
- David Fowler (1937–2004), English math historian
- Don D. Fowler (born 1936), American anthropologist and archaeologist
- Donald Fowler (1935–2020), American politician
- Earl B. Fowler (1925–2008), American admiral
- H. M. Fowler (1918–2014), American politician
- Hal Fowler (1927–2000), American poker player
- Hedley Fowler (1916–1944), English RAF Pilot who escaped from Colditz Castle
- Henry H. Fowler (1908–2000), American lawyer and politician
- Hugh S. Fowler (1912–1975), American film editor
- Ian Fowler (1939–2013), British journalist
- James Bonard Fowler (1933–2015), Alabama State Trooper convicted of shooting unarmed civil rights protestor Jummie Lee Jackson
- James W. Fowler (1940–2015), American psychologist, academic and Methodist clergyman
- Jim Fowler (1930–2019), American zoologist and television personality
- Keith Fowler (1939–2023), American educator (professor), actor, director
- Leila Fowler (1933–2025), Nigerian educationalist
- Michael Fowler (1929–2022), New Zealand architect and politician
- Norman Fowler (born 1938), English politician
- Ron Fowler (born 1944), American businessman
- Thomas W. Fowler (1921–1944), American army officer, Medal of Honor recipient
- Tillie K. Fowler (1942–2005), American politician
- Tommy Fowler (1924–2009), English footballer
- Verna Fowler (1942–2023), American Menominee educator, activist, and Catholic nun
- William Alfred Fowler (1911–1995), American astrophysicist
- Wyche Fowler (born 1940), American politician and diplomat

=== Born after 1950 ===
- Alex Fowler (born 2001), Australian basketball player
- Ally Fowler (born 1961), Australian actress
- Bernard Fowler (born 1959), American singer, producer, songwriter
- Brian Fowler (cyclist) (born 1962), New Zealand cyclist
- Bruce Fowler (tenor) (born 1965), American classical tenor
- Cam Fowler (born 1991), Canadian ice hockey player
- Carlos Fowler (born 1972), American football player
- Catherine Fowler (born 1969), film and media academic
- Charlie Fowler (1954–2006), American mountain climber, writer, and photographer
- Cheyne Fowler (born 1982), South African football player
- Chris Fowler (born 1962), American sports journalist
- Christopher Fowler (1953–2023), English fiction author
- Damon Fowler, American blues singer, guitarist, and songwriter
- Dennis Fowler (living), American surgeon and hospital executive
- Dexter Fowler (born 1986), American baseball player
- Dustin Fowler (born 1994), American baseball player
- Don Paul Fowler (1953–1999), English classicist
- Emma Fowler (born 1979), British biathlete and Army corporal
- Elspeth Fowler (born 1992), cricketer
- Graeme Fowler (born 1957), English cricketer
- Jacob Fowler (born 2004), American ice hockey player
- James H. Fowler (born 1970), American political scientist
- Jason Fowler (dancer) (living), American ballet dancer
- Jason Fowler (footballer) (born 1974), English footballer
- Jhaniele Fowler (born 1989), Jamaican netball player
- Joe Fowler (born 1955), American television personality and actor
- Karen Joy Fowler (born 1950), American fiction author
- Kevin Spacey (born Kevin Spacey Fowler, 1959), American actor
- Martin Fowler (footballer) (born 1957), English footballer
- Martin Fowler (software engineer) (born 1963), English-American software architecture author
- Mary Fowler (born 2003), Australian soccer player
- Mick Fowler (born 1956), British mountaineer
- Nick Fowler (living), New York novelist, singer, songwriter
- Pete Fowler (born 1969), Welsh illustrator
- Peter Fowler (born 1959), Australian golfer
- Rickie Fowler (born 1988), American golfer
- Robbie Fowler (born 1975), English footballer
- Ryan Fowler (born 1982), American football player
- Samuel Fowler (disambiguation), several men of this name
- Simon Fowler (born 1965), English musician
- Simon Fowler (author) (born 1956), British historian
- Therese Fowler (born 1967), American fiction author
- Tom Fowler (artist) (living), Canadian comic artist
- Tom Fowler (musician) (1951–2024), American musician
- Toni Fowler (born 1993), Filipino vlogger, actress, rapper, songwriter, and social media personality

=== Brocklebank-Fowler ===
- Christopher Brocklebank-Fowler (1934–2020), British politician

== Distribution ==
The "Fowler" surname evolved from an original use of "Fugelere" in the early 13th Century. The surname is uncommon in the United States, appearing with a rank of 250 in the 1990 Census and a rank of 267 in the 2000 Census, 27½% of the American population being accounted for surnames in the ranks of 1 to 250. In 19th Century England, "Fowler" was widespread, appearing in 35 of the 39 historic counties, with higher density in the north of England, in the 1891 Census of England and Wales. Meanwhile, in 19th Century United States, "Fowler" appears in every surveyed state in both the 1880 US census and 1840 US Census, showing a higher concentration in New York state in each case.

== Fictional characters ==
- Abijah Fowler in the American animated series Blue Eye Samurai
- Amy Farrah Fowler, from the American sitcom The Big Bang Theory
- Arthur Fowler, in the British soap opera EastEnders
- Bex Fowler, in the British soap opera EastEnders
- Gill Fowler, in the British soap opera EastEnders
- Hope Fowler, in the British soap opera EastEnders
- House Fowler, one of the noble houses of Dorne in the series A Song of Ice and Fire by George R. R. Martin
- Lily Slater, in the British soap opera EastEnders
- Lisa Fowler, in the British soap opera EastEnders
- Mark Fowler, in the British soap opera EastEnders
- Martin Fowler (EastEnders), in the British soap opera EastEnders
- Michelle Fowler, in the British soap opera EastEnders
- Pauline Fowler, in the British soap opera EastEnders
- Ruth Fowler, in the British soap opera EastEnders
- Sonia Fowler, in the British soap opera EastEnders
- Stacey Slater, in the British soap opera EastEnders
- Vicki Fowler, in the British soap opera EastEnders

== See also ==
=== Human name disambiguation pages ===
- Charles Fowler (disambiguation)
- Henry Fowler (disambiguation)
- James Fowler (disambiguation)
- John Fowler (disambiguation)
- Martin Fowler (disambiguation)
- Raymond Fowler (disambiguation)
- Samuel Fowler (disambiguation)
- Tom Fowler (disambiguation)
- Robert Fowler (disambiguation)
