= Katherine Fowler =

Catherine, Katharine or Katherine Fowler may refer to:

- Katherine Philips, poet
- Catherine Fowler (film and media academic), film and media academic in New Zealand
- Catherine S. Fowler, anthropologist
- Katharine Fowler-Billings, geologist

== See also ==
- Fowler (surname)
