= General Fowler =

General Fowler may refer to:

- Charles Astley Fowler (1865–1940), British Indian Army major general
- Edward Brush Fowler (1826-1896), US Army brigadier general
- Francis John Fowler (1864–1939), British Indian Army major general
- John Fowler (British Army officer) (1864–1939), British Army lieutenant general
- John Gordon Fowler (1905–1971), US Air Force brigadier general
