= Fowler =

Fowler may refer to:

- Fowler (surname), a surname, and list of people with the name
- A person who participates in fowling

== Places ==
=== Australia ===
- Division of Fowler, an electoral district in New South Wales
- Fowlers Bay, South Australia

=== Canada ===
- Fowler, British Columbia, a locality on the Stikine River, British Columbia
- Fowler, Ontario, an unincorporated area in the Kenora District, Ontario
- Fowler Lake Recreation Site, a conservation area in Rural Municipality of Loon Lake No. 561, Saskatchewan
- Fowlers Corners, Ontario, an unincorporated area in Peterborough and Victoria Counties, Ontario
- Fowlers Corners, New Brunswick, an unincorporated area in Queens County, New Brunswick

=== United States ===
- Fowler, California, a town in Fresno County
- Fowler, Colorado, a town in Otero County
- Fowler, Illinois, a village in Adams County
- Fowler, Indiana, a town in Benton County
- Fowler, Kansas, a city in Meade County
- Fowler, Michigan, a village in Clinton County
- Fowler, Missouri, an unincorporated community
- Fowler, New York, a town in St. Lawrence County
- Fowler, Oklahoma, a town in Oklahoma County on U.S. Route 62 in Oklahoma
- Fowler River in New Hampshire

== Business ==
- Fowler Calculators, an English manufacturer of calculators and slide rules
- D. & J. Fowler Ltd., an Australian food wholesaler and manufacturer
- John Fowler & Co., manufacturers of traction engines, agricultural equipment and railway locomotives
- Fowler & Wells Company, American publishing house
- The Fowler Museum, an archaeological museum at UCLA

== Other uses ==
- Fowler (crater), a large lunar impact crater on the far side of the Moon
- Fowler's Modern English Usage, an English-language style guide

== See also ==
- Fowler flap
- Fowler's position, a standard patient position in medicine
- Fowler's solution
- Fowler's Vacola a system for preserving food in glass jars
- Veuglaire
- Wildfowl
