= John Fowler =

John or Jack Fowler may refer to:

== Law and politics ==
- John Fowler (by 1520 – c. 1575), English member of parliament and courtier
- John Fowler (politician) (1756–1840), U.S. congressman from Kentucky
- John Edgar Fowler (1866–1930), U.S. congressman from North Carolina
- John Fowler (mayor) (born 1954), Australian mayor of South Sydney

== Sports ==
- John Fowler (cricketer) (1850–1910), New Zealand cricketer
- Jack Fowler (footballer, born 1899) (1899–1975), Welsh footballer
- Jack Fowler (footballer, born 1902) (1902–1979), English footballer
- John Fowler (footballer, born 1933) (1933–1976), Scottish footballer

== Others ==
- John Fowler (Catholic scholar) (1537–1578/9), English Roman Catholic scholar
- Sir John Fowler, 1st Baronet (1817–1898), British railway engineer
- John Fowler (agricultural engineer) (1826–1864), English steam engine pioneer
- Sir John Fowler (British Army officer) (1864–1939)
- John Gordon Fowler (1905–1971), United States Air Force general
- John Beresford Fowler (1906–1977), British interior designer
- Jack Fowler (musician), American rock musician

== Other uses ==
- John Fowler & Co., British engineering company

== See also ==
- Sir John Fowler Leece Brunner, 2nd Baronet (1865–1929), British politician
