= Thomas Fowler =

Thomas Fowler may refer to:

- Tom Fowler (cartoonist), Canadian comics artist
- Tom Fowler (musician) (1951–2024), American bass guitarist
- Thomas Fowler (courtier) (died 1590), political agent in Scotland
- Thomas Fowler (1735–1801), English physician who proposed in 1786 the Fowler's solution
- Thomas Fowler (inventor) (1777–1843), English inventor
- Tom Fowler (ice hockey) (1924–1994), Canadian ice hockey centreman
- Thomas Fowler (politician), member of the California State Senate and namesake of Fowler, California
- Thomas Fowler (academic) (1832–1904), Vice-Chancellor of the University of Oxford, 1899–1901
- Thomas W. Fowler (1921–1944), U.S. Army officer and Medal of Honor recipient
- Thomas Fowler (cricketer), English cricketer and solicitor
- Thomas Fowler (MP) for Wycombe (UK Parliament constituency)
