= William Fowler =

William Fowler may refer to:

== Politicians ==
- William Fowler (MP for Cambridge) (1828–1905), English MP and barrister
- William Fowler (MP for Wycombe), English justice of the peace and member of parliament for Wycombe, 1431
- Wyche Fowler (William Wyche Fowler, Jr., born 1940), American politician and diplomat
- William Fowler (Brothertown Indian) (1815–1862), first non-white Wisconsin legislator; killed in the U.S. Civil War
- William Fowler (New Hampshire politician), member of the New Hampshire House of Representatives

== Sports ==
- William Herbert Fowler (1856–1941), English amateur cricketer and golf course architect, also known as Bill
- Bill Fowler (cricketer, born 1959), English cricketer

== Military ==
- William M. Fowler (born 1944), American naval historian
- W. M. W. Fowler (William Menzies Weekes Fowler, 1914–1977), English Royal Air Force pilot

== Others ==
- William Fowler (artist) (1761–1832), English artist
- William Fowler (architect) (1824–1906), Scottish architect
- William Fowler (makar) (c. 1560–1612), Scottish writer
- William Chauncey Fowler (1793–1881), American scholar
- William Fowler (Mormon) (1830–1865), Latter-day Saints hymn writer
- William Weekes Fowler (1849–1923), English entomologist who wrote the Coleoptera of the British Islands
- William Alfred Fowler (1911–1995), American astrophysicist who studied nuclear reactions in stars
- William Hope Fowler (1876–1933), Scottish physician and pioneer of radiology
- William Warde Fowler (1847–1921), English historian and ornithologist
- William Henry Fowler (1854–1932), founder of Fowler's Calculators
- William Fowler, a fictional character in the animated series Transformers: Prime

== See also ==
- William Fowler Mountford Copeland, horticulturalist
