= Don Fowler =

Don Fowler may refer to:

- Donald Fowler (1935–2020), National Chairman of the Democratic National Committee
- Don Paul Fowler (1953–1999), English classicist
- Don D. Fowler, anthropologist and archaeologist
