= Charles Fowler (disambiguation) =

Charles Fowler (1792–1867) was an English architect.

Charles Fowler may also refer to:

- Charles A. Fowler, New York state senator
- Charles A. Fowler (engineer), recipient of the Eugene G. Fubini Award, see Defense Science Board
- Charles Henry Fowler (1837–1908), Canadian-American Bishop of the Methodist Episcopal Church
- C. Hodgson Fowler (1840–1910), English architect
- Charles J. Fowler, former president of the American Holiness Association, see Eastern Nazarene College
- Charles N. Fowler (1852–1932), American national politician
- Charlie Fowler (1954–2006), American mountain climber, writer, and photographer
- Charlie Fowler (footballer) (1902–1970), Australian rules footballer
- Charles Astley Fowler (1865–1940), officer in the British Indian Army
