= Wuzzie George =

Northern Paiute cultural bearer from Nevada, U.S. (c. 1880–1984

Wuzzie Dick George
- Born: Wiziʔi c. 1880; Nevada
- Died: December 20, 1984; Nevada
- Citizenship: Paiute-Shoshone Tribe of the Fallon Reservation and Colony and U.S.
- Education: Stewart Indian School
- Occupations: homemaker, culture bearer, artisan

Wuzzie Dick George (c. 1880 – December 20, 1984) was a Northern Paiute craftsperson who worked to preserve the traditional lifeways and tribal customs of her people. She served as a key collaborator in anthropologist's Margaret Wheat's efforts to record Northern Paiute lifeways.

== Early life ==
Wuzzie Dick George was born circa 1880–1883 and given the name Wiziʔi, "Small Animal," which became Wuzzie in English. She was the daughter of Sam and Suzie Dick, of the Toi Dicutta, "Cattail-Eater" band of Northern Paiute from western Nevada. The Northern Paiutes once led a nomadic lifestyle, and she was born during a pine-nut gathering expedition in the Stillwater Mountain Range, but she spent the majority of her life in what are now known as Fallon and Stillwater, Nevada.

When she was a girl, her grandparents Stovepipe and Mattie were major influences; her grandmother especially passed on the tribal customs and traditional stories that George would later work to preserve. After her parents separated when she was 10 years old, Wuzzie began working for the white Ernst family and started to learn English. She also briefly attended the Stewart Indian School near Carson City, but her father pulled her out after six months due to a measles epidemic.

As a young woman, she met and married Jimmy George, with whom she had eight children, five of whom survived to adulthood. They were married until his death in 1969.

== Lifeways preservation ==
George taught traditional lifeways as a means of preserving them, instructing both her own descendants and others, including through demonstrations at schools in her region. She also worked as an interpreter for her husband, who served as a medicine man for about 40 years until the mid-1950s.

For three decades, she also worked to record tribal practices so they would live on into the future. She worked with the anthropologist Margaret Wheat, featuring prominently in her book Survival Arts of the Primitive Paiutes, as well as the anthropologists Catherine S. Fowler and Sven Liljeblad. George traveled with Wheat to give presentations and demonstrations, including building a cattail house at the Idaho State Museum. After retiring from his traditional medicine practice, George's husband assisted her in her efforts.

Many of the objects that she produced, such as baskets and duck decoys, were carefully preserved. She contributed to the collections of the Nevada State Museum in Carson City, the Nevada Historical Society in Reno, and the Churchill County Museum in Fallon. Her work is also held by the National Museum of the American Indian.

== Death and legacy ==
Wuzzie George died in 1984, at a reported age of 104.

In 1995, the Nevada Assembly commended her for her contribution to preserving Northern Paiute folkways, and the testimonies and objects she left behind continue to be used for research and education. The local children's book author Nancy Raven also featured George in her 2008 book Wuzzie Comes to Camp.
