= Margaret Wheat =

American anthropologist

Margaret Marean Wheat (September 9, 1908 — August 28, 1988) was an American anthropologist, archeologist and paleontologist who worked and made significant contributions in the Great Basin, in North America.

== Personal life ==
She was born to Stanley and Ruth Marean in Fallon, Nevada, where her father served as water master to the Newlands Reclamation Project. Margaret was educated in the Fallon public schools and at the University of Nevada, Reno, where she completed two years of study in the field of geology. She married William Hatton the son of Judge Hatton, of Tonopah, Nevada and they had four children together before divorcing in 1937. Not long after her divorce she married Wendel Wheat, then working at a Civilian Conservation Corps camp near Fallon. Together they explored the wilderness of the Great Basin and she developed her interests in caves, fossils and the Indians. Wheat began taking various jobs with scientific field work expeditions, from the U.S. Geological Survey to the Nevada State Museum's Tule Springs dig.

== Paleontology and archaeology ==
Wheat had a particular interest in the Ichthyosaur area near the mining camp of Berlin, Nevada. In 1954 she persuaded paleontologists from the University of California-Berkeley, in 1954, to excavate fossil remains at the site. Wheat was the first person to recognize the fossils miners had uncovered as Ichthyosaur bones, and brought the fossils to the attention of Charles Lewis Camp, former director of the University of California Museum of Paleontology. Wheat was appointed by Governor Grant Sawyer to the Nevada Parks Commission, and was instrumental in getting the state to acquire and preserve the area as The Berlin-Ichthyosaur State Park. Wheat served on the Nevada Ichthyosaur Park Board between 1953 and 1960.

Additionally, Wheat’s knowledge of the area allowed her to lead archaeologists to several caves used by ancient man, including the famous Hidden Cave, east of Fallon, on land administered by the Bureau of Land Management. She participated in archaeological excavations at Tule Springs led by the Nevada State Museum, discovering human occupation in that area dating back 11,000 years.

== Ethnography ==
Wheat’s largest contribution was in the field of ethnography and anthropology of Northern Paiute Indians. Starting in the 1940s she began interviewing and documenting the lives of Paiute peoples, first using wire recording and large format cameras, and eventually moving on to tape recorders and 35 mm cameras which were far more portable. A primary informant, and important contact within the Paiute community was Wuzzie George, a Northern Paiute woman committed to preserving traditional lifeways within her community. In 1967, Wheat’s research was published as a book Survival Arts of the Primitive Paiutes by the University of Nevada Press. Wheat was recognized by first annual Ladies of the Press Luncheon in 1969 and honored as an outstanding Nevada woman writer. She also won awards from the Reno Professional Club and the Nevada Library Association for the publication. During this field work, funded by grants from the Fleischmann Foundation through the Foresta Institute, Wheat shot several thousand feet of film was shot in 1964 and 1979. In 1983 the film Tule Technology: Northern Paiutes Uses of Marsh Resources in Western Nevada by the Smithsonian Institution Office, Folklife Programs utilized these films. In 1980, she received an honorary doctorate of science degree from the University of Nevada. Wheat resided in Fallon until her death on August 28, 1988.
