= Fowler, British Columbia =

Fowler
- Location of Fowler in British Columbia
- Coordinates: 56°50′00″N 131°46′00″W
- Country: Canada
- Province: British Columbia
- Area codes: 250, 778

Fowler is a locality on the west side of the lower Stikine River in northwestern British Columbia, Canada, located in the vicinity of the Great Glacier and Choquette Hot Springs Provincial Park. Fowler Creek lies opposite it across the Stikine.

== See also ==
- Stikine, British Columbia
- Glenora, British Columbia
- Fowler (disambiguation)
