= Gatecliff Rockshelter =

Archaeological site in the Great Basin area of the western United States

- U.S. National Register of Historic Places
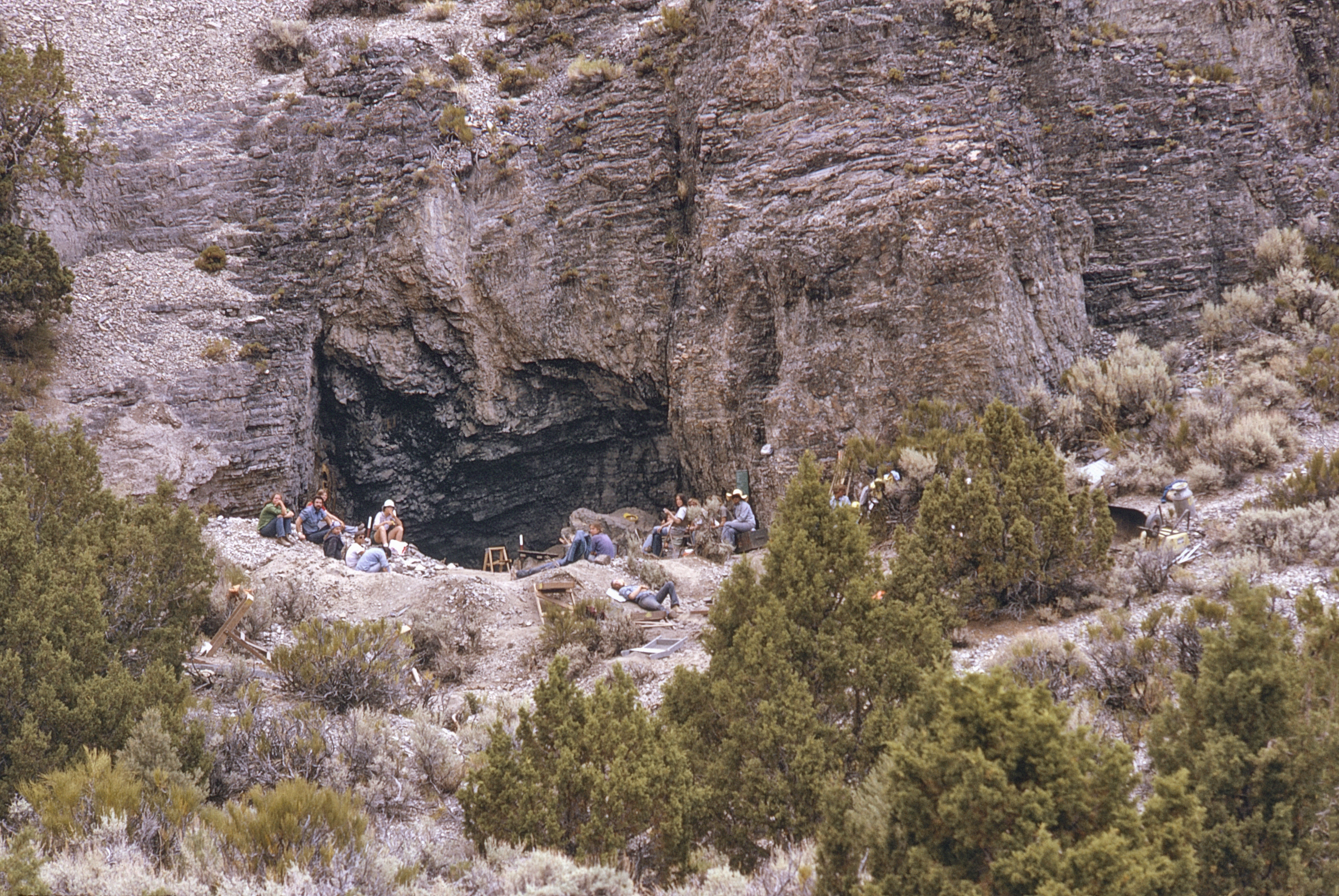

- Location within Nevada Location within the United States
- Nearest city: Austin, Nevada
- Coordinates: 39°0′25″N 116°46′43″W
- Built: 6000
- NRHP reference No.: 79001464
- Added to NRHP: April 27, 1979

Gatecliff Rockshelter (26NY301) is a major archaeological site in the Great Basin area of the western United States that provides remarkable stratigraphy; it has been called the "deepest archaeological rock shelter in the Americas". Located in Mill Canyon of the Toquima Range in the Monitor Valley of central Nevada, Gatecliff Rockshelter has an elevation of 7,750 feet (2,360 m). David Hurst Thomas discovered Gatecliff Rockshelter in 1970 and began excavations in 1971. Full scale excavations occurred at Gatecliff Rockshelter for about seven field seasons in which nearly 33 feet (10 m) of sediments were exposed for a well-defined stratigraphic sequence. The well-preserved artifacts and undisturbed sediments at Gatecliff Rockshelter provides data and information have been applied to a range of research topics. Based on the analysis of the artifacts at Gatecliff Rockshelter, it can be determined that it was most likely a short-term field camp throughout prehistory. The latest evidence for human usage at Gatecliff occurs between ca. 5500 B.P. to 1250 B.P.

In August 1974, a short-film was created: Gatecliff: American Indian Rock-Shelter.

In April 1979, Gatecliff Rockshelter was listed in the National Register of Historic Places.

== Discovery ==
David Hurst Thomas discovered Gatecliff Rockshelter in June 1970 following his first field season in the Reese River Valley and ancient Lake Tonopah. Thomas also conducted systematic settlement surveys of the Monitor Valley in Central Nevada in efforts to study prehistoric ecology, subsistence patterns, and chronological sequences of the Great Basin. After a day of excavation, Thomas and his crew stopped by a local diner. At the dinner, Thomas spoke with the waitress's husband, Gale Peer, a mining geologist with over 40 years of experience in the Great Basin. Peer gave the crew of archaeologists a few general directions to an interesting cave with possible rock art. The following year, Thomas returned and attempted to search for this cave. After searching through nearly 15 canyons in the area, driving through and getting out of the car to physically check the caves and rock shelters, Thomas ended at the Mill Canyon. At the opening of the rock shelter, Thomas observed pictographs but no visual artifacts. The paintings were human figures in red and yellow as well as cryptic motifs in black and white on the ceiling and rear wall. Thomas then dug a 12 inches (30 cm) deep test pit to ensure the potential of the site. The test pit revealed sub-surface deposits and incised stones with some burned bones. Given the potential for undisturbed deposits useful for establishing a chronological framework for the area, further excavations began in 1971 and continued for nearly 7 years.

=== Naming ===
The archaeological site Gatecliff Rockshelter is named after the Silurian Gatecliff Formation, in which rock shelter occurs. It is made up of chert and dolomite strata.

== Excavation ==
After the initial discovery in 1970, Thomas and a crew from the University of California Davis began an extensive, large scale excavation. By the end of the first season, the crew had excavated a 7 meter long and 3 meter deep trench. Research continued in 1973 with the sponsorship of the American Museum of Natural History and Expeditions International. The excavations that year reached a depth of 4.8 meters and obtained radiocarbon dates of approximately 2500 B.C. In 1974, the American Museum of Natural History and Education Expeditions International again sponsored the excavations at the Gatecliff Rockshelter. By the end of this season, the crew had excavated 98 cubic meters of deposits. Due to the danger of the steep and exposed sidewalls, the excavation strategy switched from vertical to horizontal. Starting in 1975, the excavators at Gatecliff removed stratigraphic layers one by one based on their natural levels. Natural levels were determined by the different strata in the deposits seen in the excavation profile. Horizontal strategies continued in 1976 in which the excavators ultimately removed deposits until reaching bedrock. Excavations were completed in late August 1978 with a depth of nearly 39 feet (12 m) and a total of 23,000 cubic feet (650 m^{3}) of deposits removed.

=== Vertical excavation ===
The initial objective at Gatecliff Rockshelter, Nevada was establishing and dating a stratigraphic sequence that could be applied regionally in the Great Basin area; this would require a vertical excavation strategy. During the early excavations, the deposits were troweled and screened with a 1/8 inch mesh screen. The vertical excavation revealed a pattern of periodic floods that filled the rock shelter with silt and, when dried out, people exploited it again. Due to the hazardous, steep walls produced by the vertical excavation, Thomas and his crew changed their strategy in 1975 as well as their primary objectives; instead of working on exposing a deep, stratified profile, the crew began to remove the deposits over a larger horizontal area to document activity areas. No further excavation occurred on the sidewalls.

=== Horizontal excavation ===
During the excavations, Gatecliff Rockshelter proved to be more useful than just for chronology. The new objective with a horizontal excavation at the rock shelter, the previous being chronology, emphasized the reconstruction pre-historic activities and events that occurred at the site. The focus shifted to finding artifacts and mapping them on large-scale living floor maps. In 1975, over a period of ten days, the crew removed a massive chert roof fall that covered half of the rear of the rock shelter. The excavation units were removed by the visible natural levels or strata; if natural levels exceeded 3.9 inches (10 cm), arbitrary levels were created within the natural levels. Bags of deposits were passed outside of the cave and then screened outside.

== Stratigraphy ==
The decade of excavations from 1970 to 1978 exposed a remarkable stratigraphic sequence at Gatecliff Rockshelter. The lack of erosion and episodic deposits of sediments due to water provided a well-defined and intact cultural sequence that could be applied to the Great Basin area. The deposits consisted of 56 geological strata with 16 cultural horizons; 23 strata contained rubble and 33 contained fine silt material. The deposits also include a 0.79 inches (2 cm) layer of tephra from Mount Mazama's eruption about 6600 to 7000 B.P. The stratigraphy can also be divided into eight stages to reflect a specific climatic regime. Forty-seven radiocarbon dates were obtained and thoroughly ground the chronological sequence of Gatecliff Rockshelter.

== Paleontology ==
In Gatecliff Rockshelter, the excavators recovered over 51,000 animal bones. Donald K. Grayson identified and analyzed approximately 13,000 bones and teeth of small mammals. Due to the nature of the rock shelter and the lack of taphonomic knowledge, Grayson argued that the processes that produced this massive collection of bones could not be determined. It could be a result of human activities, other animals, and natural processes. These small mammals include rabbits, chipmunks, squirrels, gophers, rats, voles, mice, dogs, and coyotes; only two of the taxa found at Gatecliff are absent from the present Toquima-Monitor area.

Large mammal remains represent the bulk of the bones found at Gatecliff. Roughly 90% of the bones came from the bighorn sheep, a major prey of high-altitude hunters. Other large mammals include pronghorn, elk, and bison.

On a smaller scale, approximately 500 elements of amphibians and reptiles were recovered. The amphibians and reptiles at the rock shelter include lizards, toads, and snakes.

== Material culture ==
The excavations at Gatecliff Rockshelter recovered over 400 projectile points. From this large collection of identifiable projectile points, Thomas was able to identify specific projectile point styles as specific time markers. The sequence contains the Gatecliff series dating from ca. 4000 B.C. – 1000 B.C., the Elko series from ca. 1300 B.C. – A.D., Rosegate series from ca. A.D. 700- A.D. 1300, and the Desert series from ca. A.D. 1300 – 1850. Other stone tools found include metates, palettes (small grinding stones), handstones, and workedturquoise. Several turquoise mines exist throughout the Monitor Valley which could provide the turquoise source for Gatecliff; Indian Blue Mine is the best known mine located 3 miles south of Toquima Cave.

Gatecliff Rockshelter also produced over 400 incised stones – the largest known concentration in the New World. Incised stones include any portable stone purposefully modified with cuts or lines or holes. The incised stones at Gatecliff Rockshelter include simple to complex motifs of lines, rows, chevrons, circles, and striations. Incised stones have also been considered as a means of dating rock art styles.

Approximately 35 perishable artifacts were recovered in Gatecliff Rockshelter; these include 11 basket fragments and 18 pieces of cordage. The preferred material for cordage is Artemisia (genus) and Salix sp. for baskets. According to James M. Adovasio, the preference for willow, despite its sporadic distribution across Monitor Valley, comes from its durability, flexibility, consistent thickness of the bark, and the lack of lateral twigs. The techniques used in the Monitor Valley include simple twining, open and close diagonal twining, and coiling.

In addition, the excavations at Gatecliff Rockshelter recovered 17 shell beads and 4 ornaments. The shells include Olivella (gastropod), Haliotis cracherodii, and Haliotis cracherodii.[15] Other materials include mica and stone.

Additional artifacts found at Gatecliff Rockshelter include wooden artifacts (promontory pegs, firemaking tools, bow fragments, etc.), bone artifacts (bone beads, awls, and tubes), a glass bead (possible trade bead), a few pieces of ceramic sherds, and some incised clay objects.

== Rock art ==
The rock art at Gatecliff Rockshelter includes white, red, yellow, and orange pigments; black was not used on the walls but decorated small stones. The paint materials are derived from local sources. Of the images, fifty-three were recognizable with 13 different motifs and some unidentifiable blotches. The important images include human anthropomorphs and linear arrangements. Cupule motifs account for 11 percent of the images, handprints 9 percent, and bisected chevrons 7 present.
