= 37th Brigade (United Kingdom) =

37th Brigade 37th Infantry Brigade 37th Independent Infantry Brigade
- Active: 1914–1919; 1939–1941
- Country: United Kingdom
- Branch: British Army
- Type: Infantry
- Size: Brigade
- Engagements: First World War; Second World War

Commanders
- Notable commanders: Charles Astley Fowler; Walter Oxley; Daniel Beak

The 37th Brigade was an infantry brigade of the British Army that served in both the First and the Second World Wars.

== First World War ==
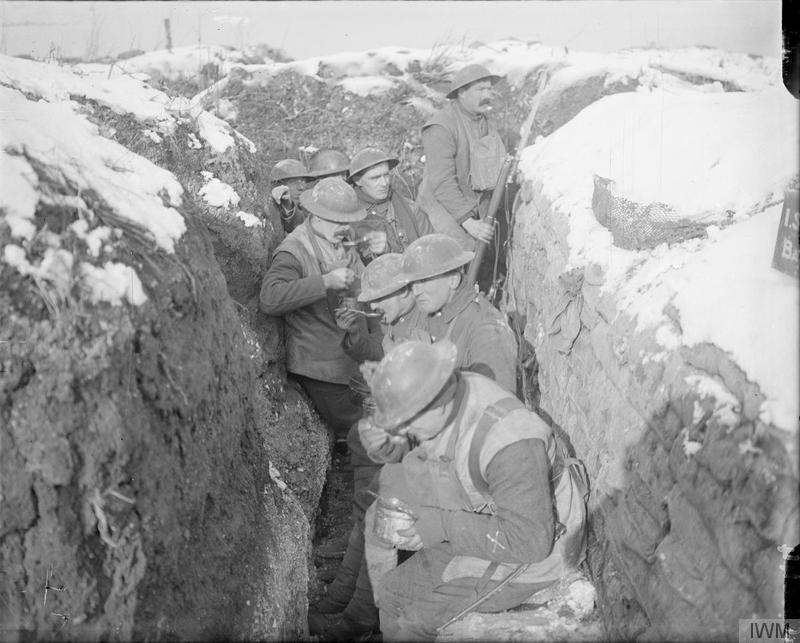
Men of the 6th (Service) Battalion, Queen's (Royal West Surrey Regiment) eating dinner in the trenches, Arras, France, March 1917.

The 37th Brigade was one of the "New Army" or Kitchener's Army brigades, and was assigned to the 12th (Eastern) Division and served on the Western Front during the First World War. The brigade was raised in August 1914 from the thousands of men volunteering for Kitchener's New Armies.

=== Order of battle ===
The 37th Brigade was constituted as follows during the war:

- 6th (Service) Battalion, Queen's (Royal West Surrey Regiment)
- 6th (Service) Battalion, Buffs (East Kent Regiment)
- 7th (Service) Battalion, East Surrey Regiment (disbanded February 1918)
- 6th (Service) Battalion, Queen's Own (Royal West Kent Regiment)
- 37th Machine Gun Company, Machine Gun Corps (formed 4 February 1916, moved to 12th Battalion, Machine Gun Corps on 1 March 1918)
- 37th Trench Mortar Battery (formed 15 June 1916)

== Second World War ==
The 37th Infantry Brigade was reformed on 7 October 1939 as a 2nd Line Territorial Army infantry brigade as a duplicate of 133rd Infantry Brigade. The 37th Infantry Brigade was with the 12th (Eastern) Infantry Division when they were sent in 1940 to France to join the British Expeditionary Force. The division suffered very heavy casualties during the Battle of France and was disbanded in July 1940 after having been evacuated to England from Dunkirk. In November 1941 the brigade joined the 3rd Infantry Division and was redesignated the 7th Infantry Brigade.

=== Order of battle ===
37th Brigade was constituted as follows during the war:

- 5th Battalion, Buffs (Royal East Kent Regiment) (to 26 October 1939)
- 6th Battalion, Royal Sussex Regiment
- 7th (Cinque Ports) Battalion, Royal Sussex Regiment (left 19 November 1941 and converted to 109th Light Anti-Aircraft Regiment, Royal Artillery)
- 2/6th Battalion, East Surrey Regiment (from 26 October 1939)
- 37th Independent Infantry Brigade Anti-Tank Company (formed 12 September 1940, disbanded 7 July 1941)
- 2nd Battalion, South Wales Borderers (from 8 December 1941)

=== Commanders ===
The following officers commanded 37th Brigade during the war:

- Brigadier R.J.P. Wyatt (until 20 May 1940)
- Lieutenant-Colonel E.K.B. Warnop (Acting, from 27 May until 11 June 1940)
- Brigadier R.J.P. Wyatt (from 11 June 1940 until 14 February 1942)
- Brigadier W.H. Oxley (from 14 February until 1 June 1942)
- Brigadier B.B. Rackham (from 1 June until 10 August 1944)
- Colonel D.M.W. Beak (Acting, from 10 August until 10 September 1944)
- Brigadier D.H. Haugh (from 10 September 1944)

== Recipients of the Victoria Cross ==
- Sergeant Harry Cator, 7th (Service) Battalion, East Surrey Regiment, Great War
- Lance Corporal William Richard Cotter, 6th (Service) Battalion, Buffs (East Kent Regiment), Great War
- Sergeant Thomas James Harris, 6th (Service) Battalion, (Queen's Own) Royal West Kent Regiment, Great War

== Bibliography ==
- Joslen, H. F. (2003) [1960]. Orders of Battle: Second World War, 1939–1945. Uckfield, East Sussex: Naval and Military Press. ISBN 978-1-84342-474-1.
