= Robert L. Kelly =

American anthropologist (born 1957)

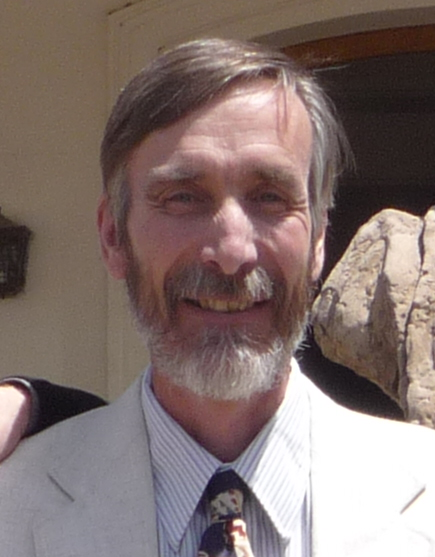
Robert L. Kelly in 2009

Robert Laurens Kelly (born March 16, 1957) is an American anthropologist who is a professor at the University of Wyoming. As a professor, he has taught introductory Archaeology as well as upper-level courses focused in Hunter-Gathers, North American Archaeology, Lithic Analysis, and Human Behavioral Ecology. Kelly's interest in archaeology began when he was a sophomore in high school in 1973. His first experience in fieldwork was an excavation of Gatecliff Rockshelter, a prehistoric site in central Nevada. Since then, Kelly has been involved with archaeology and has dedicated the majority of his work to the ethnology, ethnography, and archaeology of foraging peoples, which include research on lithic technology, initial colonization of the New World, evolutionary ecology of hunter-gatherers, and archaeological method and theory. He has been involved in research projects throughout the United States and in Chile, where he studied the remains of the Inca as well as coastal shell middens, and Madagascar, where in order to learn about farmer-forager society, Kelly has participated in ethnoarchaeological research. A majority of his work has been carried out in the Great Basin, but after moving to Wyoming in 1997 he has shifted his research to the rockshelters in the southwest Wyoming and the Bighorn Mountains.

Outside of his research in archaeology, Bob Kelly also promotes tourism to historic and archaeological sites in Wyoming. In doing so, he has given many lectures around Wyoming and helped create a website to promote Wyoming’s heritage. The website, funded by the Wyoming Cultural Trust Fund and maintained by the University of Wyoming Department of Anthropology, acts as a directory for information about Wyoming Prehistoric and Historic Sites. Kelly also served as an Amicus Curiae in the Kennewick case.. He has served as President of the Society for American Archaeology from 2001 to 2003.

He is running a major research project in Glacier National Park to examine the effects of climate change.

== Personal information ==
Kelly was born on March 16, 1957, in Connecticut. From a very young age, he wanted to move west. Kelly has two sons, Dycus and Matthew. Kelly enjoys skiing, playing piano, and traveling when time permits. When teaching, his goal is to show the students the process of archaeology and how much scraps of bone or broken stone tools can teach us.

== Background ==
Kelly attended Cornell University where he received his BA in Anthropology in 1978. After graduating from Cornell, he moved west to continue his studies at the University of New Mexico where he received his MA in 1980. Much of his work and research was centered on the Great Basin and he spent over a decade working on sites and projects in Nevada. In 1985, he earned his doctorate from the University of Michigan with a dissertation on mobility and sedentism of hunter-gatherers. His fieldwork has been conducted in the Great Basin, the Southwestern United States, Chile, and Madagascar. He has authored over 100 publications. He and David Hurst Thomas have written an introductory textbook titled Archaeology that is widely used in many colleges and universities. Kelly's book The Foraging Spectrum: Diversity in Hunter-Gatherer Lifeways, published in 1995, is considered to be a landmark in anthropology. In the book, Kelly points out that lifeways among foraging societies were quite diverse.

== Employment history ==
After receiving his PhD from the University of Michigan in 1985, Kelly became a lecturer at Colby College in Maine. From 1986 to 1997, he was the coordinator of the Archaeology program at the University of Louisville in Kentucky. During his tenure there, Kelly served as head of the Anthropology Department from 1992 to 1997, as well as Chair of the college or Arts and Sciences Social Science Division from 1996 to 1997. From 1997 to present, Kelly has been a professor in anthropology at the University of Wyoming, where he served as head from 2005 to 2008.

Kelly served as secretary for the Archaeology Division of the American Anthropological Association from 1996 to 1998. From 1998 to 2001, he acted as secretary for the Great Basin Anthropological Association. In 2001, Kelly was elected president of the Society for American Archaeology (SAA). He also serves on the editorial boards for the journals American Antiquity, Research Handbooks in Archaeology of the World Archaeological Congress, and the on-line journal Before Farming.

== Awards and honors ==
In 1988 Kelly received the Weatherhead Fellow Award at the School of American Research in Santa Fe, New Mexico. In the same year, he received the President's Young Investigator Award for Excellence in Research and Scholarship at the University of Louisville. In 1993, he received the Metrouniversity Outstanding Adult Educator of the Year Award and the Faculty Award for teaching effectiveness from the Latin American Student Association. He has been invited to speak at many universities all over the world, and was the William Lipe Visiting Scholar at Washington State University in 2007.

== Key excavations ==
Kelly has led or assisted in numerous field projects and site excavations. These projects include assisting Robert Bettinger survey in the central Sierra Nevada in 1978; supervising the excavation at Triple-T Rockshelter, Nevada directed by David H. Thomas in 1976; directing the Carson-Stillwater Archaeological Project in Nevada from 1980 to 1981, 1986, and 1987–present; co-directing with Margaret Nelson at the Black Range Archaeological Project, Southwest New Mexico in 1988–1989; leading the test excavation of Mustang Rockshelter, Nevada in 1990; leading the Pine Springs reinvestigation of Southwestern Wyoming in 1998 and 2000; leading the investigation of Early Holocene/Late Pleistocene geology and archaeology of the Bighorn Mountains from 2001 to the present; and leading a research and excavation project in Glacier National Park in attempt to collect archaeological and paleoecological data related climate change.

== Research emphasis ==
Kelly has shaped and contributed much to our understanding of hunter-gatherer societies. He has a deep interest in Western North American archaeology, especially in the Great Basin area. Current understanding of hunter-gatherer mobility and foraging patterns are also influenced strongly by his research, fieldwork, and ethnology. By examining the Pleistocene colonization of the Americas by examining artifacts and lithic technology, Kelly reconstructs past life-ways and compares them to current foraging societies, and examines human adaptation to climate change during different periods in the past.

Kelly is also interested in improving and fine-tuning archaeological practice.. He has successfully challenged the preconceived notions of what it means to be hunter-gatherer through his research with the ethnographic record. Kelly is also interested in preserving the rights of indigenous peoples as affected by legislation like NAGPRA.

Kelly's research is focused on the Pleistocene colonization of the Americas as well as the effects of climate change to human cultural and behavioral adaptations. Kelly is also conducting fieldwork and research on why so few fluted points are found in caves and rockshelters.

== Selected books and monographs ==
- The Fifth Beginning: What Six Million Years of Human History Can Tell Us about Our Future (Robert L. Kelly). 2016. Oakland, CA: University of California Press.
- Doing Archaeology (Robert L. Kelly and David H. Thomas). 2011. Belmont, California. CD-ROM.
- Archaeology: Down to Earth, 4th Edition (Robert L. Kelly and David H. Thomas). 2011. Cengage Learning/Wadsworth.
- Archaeology, 5th Edition (Robert L. Kelly and David H. Thomas). 2010. Cengage Learning/Wadsworth.
- Mustang Shelter: Test Excavation of a Rockshelter in the Stillwater Mountains, Western Nevada (Robert L. Kelly). Nevada Bureau of Land Management Cultural Resource Series 18 + CD. http://www.blm.gov/
- The Foraging Spectrum: Diversity in Hunter-Gatherer Lifeways (Robert L. Kelly). 2007. Revised. Percheron Press, Clinton Corners, New York.
- Prehistory of the Carson Desert and Stillwater Mountains, Nevada: Environment, Mobility and Subsistence (Robert L. Kelly). 2001. University of Utah Anthropological Papers 123, Salt Lake City, Utah.
- The Foraging Spectrum: Diversity in Hunter-Gatherer Lifeways (Robert L. Kelly). 1995. Washington, D.C.: Smithsonian Institution Press.

== Selected papers ==
- Technology (Robert L. Kelly). 2011. Oxford Handbook of Hunter-Gatherer Archaeology, edited by V. Cummings, P, Jordan, and M. Zvelebil. Oxford, Oxford University Press.
- Obsidian in the Carson Desert: Mobility or Trade? (Robert L. Kelly). 2011. Investigating Prehistoric Trade and Exchange in Western North America, edited by Richard E. Hughes. Salt Lake City, University of Utah Press.
- A Good Start (Robert L. Kelly). 2010. (Comment on Forum: The Intergenerational Transfer of Wealth). Current Anthropology 51: 109–110.
- Experimental Analysis of the Practical Limits of Lithic Refitting (J. Laughlin and Robert L. Kelly). 2010. Journal of Archaeological Science 37: 427–433.
- Did the Ancestors of Native Americans Cause Animal Extinctions in Late Pleistocene North America? (Robert L. Kelly and M. Prasciunas). 2007. Native Americans and the Environment: Perspectives on the Ecological Indian, edited by M.E. Harkin and D.R. Lewis, pp. 95–122. Lincoln, University of Nebraska Press.
- Hunter-Gatherers, Archaeology, and the Role of Selection in the Evolution of the Human Mind (Robert L. Kelly). 2005. A Catalyst for Ideas: Anthropological Archaeology and the Legacy of Douglas W. Schwartz, pp. 19–39, edited by Vernon Scarborough and Richard Leventhal. Santa Fe, School of American Research Press.
- Lithic Technology: The Analysis of Stone Tools and Debitage (reprint of 1997 article) (Robert L. Kelly). 2002. Archaeology: Original Readings in Method and Practice, edited by P. Peregrine, C. Ember, and M. Ember, pp. 48–61. Prentice-Hall, Upper Saddle River, NJ.
- Elements of a Behavioral Ecological Paradigm for the Study of Prehistoric Hunter-Gatherers (Robert L. Kelly). 2000. Social Theory in Archaeology, edited by M.B. Schiffer, pp. 63–78. University of Utah Press, Salt Lake City.
- Hunter-Gatherer Foraging and Colonization of the Western Hemisphere (Robert L. Kelly). 1999. Anthropologie 37(1): 143-153
- Theoretical and Archaeological Insights into Foraging Strategies among the Prehistoric Inhabitants of the Stillwater Marsh Wetlands (Robert L. Kelly). 1999. Understanding Prehistoric Lifeways in the Great Basin Wetlands: Bioarchaeological Reconstruction and Interpretation, edited by B. Hemphill and C.S. Larsen, pp. 117–150. University of Utah Press, Salt Lake City.
- Hunter-Gatherer Lifeways in the Carson Sink: A Context for Bioarchaeology (Robert L. Kelly). 1995. Bioarchaeology of the Stillwater Marsh: Prehistoric Human Adaptation in the Western Great Basin, C.S. Larsen and R.L. Kelly, editors. Anthropological Papers of the American Museum of Natural History 77:12-32
- The Current Status of Great Basin Archaeology (Robert L. Kelly). 1993. Presented at the 58th Annual Meeting of the Society for American Archaeology, St. Louis, MO.
