= Hidden Cave =

Archaeological cave site in Nevada, U.S.

- Location within Nevada
- Location: Churchill County, Nevada, United States
- Coordinates: 39°24′24.1″N 118°37′37.1″W

Hidden Cave is an archaeological cave site located in the Great Basin near Fallon, Nevada, United States. It got its name from Mark Harrington, who first excavated the cave and had a hard time finding the entrance, who said at the time, "This is one hidden cave!" It was excavated originally in the 1930s by Harrington and then excavated twice more before being returned to for the final time in 1978 by David Hurst Thomas for a more in depth excavation. The site dates back to the early Desert Archaic Culture from c. 4000 to 2000 years ago. Thousands of Archaic artifacts have been found here, and the site "provides important, if unusual clues about Desert Archaic lifeways". Hidden Cave was not lived in, but used as storage site for goods and tools for the 2000 years of its survival.

== History ==
Hidden Cave is located at a hilltop some 12 miles (19 km) from Fallon and east of Lahontan Valley. It was centered in the Toedokado Territory. The occupants resided near still water marshes where the pinon nut can be easily harvested. The cave was gouged out and created around 21,000 years ago by waves of Lake Lahontan. It was flooded until about 4,000 years ago, when the Desert Archaic people used it for year-round storage. Some say because of its location, it was a good spot for hiding valuables as well. The site was occupied during the Neoglacial period, which resulted in more rainfall in the river valleys. The main plant food used by the prehistoric occupants was the pinon nut.

== Excavation process ==
For the past 10,000 years, the deposits in Hidden Cave have increased in thickness due to debris deposited on the floor through water and wind action. The most recent levels of debris blocked the entrance, making the discovery difficult. Four generations of archaeologists have worked at Hidden Cave, demonstrating that the site was used for the storage of food, tools, and for the placement of a few burials.

There was a myth in the late 1800s that a robber had taken treasure and hid it in one of the caves in the Grimes Point area. Four boys heard this myth and in 1927 went looking for the cave that had the treasure. One boy, Dick Wisenhut, felt a breeze coming from rocks right outside Hidden Cave. They squeezed their way in after removing some rocks, but were too scared explore it in detail until some six months later. The cave was their secret until a local miner, Mr. McRiley, came in and mined it for bat guano, which was a high quality fertilizer. After Mr. McRiley complained about all the Indian junk, word got out to archaeologists. McRiley's account of the cave reached Margaret Wheat, a lifelong Fallon resident and archaeologist. Wheat recognized the value and invited Mark Raymond Harrington, who had previously excavated Pueblo Grande de Nevada and Gypsum Cave, to investigate.

Mark Harrington was the first archaeologist to excavate Hidden Cave. He was assisted by S.M. Wheeler in 1935. They could not find the entrance to the cave, hence Harrington’s comment, and eventual naming of the cave. They discovered an assortment of artifacts including baskets, carved wood, and worked leather. However conditions in the cave prevented substantial excavations. The problem was the amount of dust, which would get stirred up making it difficult to see and breathe.

Five years later, S.M. Wheeler returned with his wife Georgette Wheeler to try and do a more in depth excavation and analysis of Hidden Cave. Together, they were known for their photography and field note-taking ability. That summer they collected over 1500 different artifacts related to the Basket Makers II and III cultures. The discovery of a horse bone indicated that the cave might have been open during the Pleistocene. The Wheelers still had a difficult time excavating due to the dust. At the end of the summer, they put up an iron gate to prevent vandalism, allow people to see what they had discovered, and to allow future archeologists to explore.

The most recent excavations took place in 1979 by David Hurst Thomas. He first got there in 1967, but the dust prevented major excavation. In 1978, Thomas had wooden walkways and ramps built so people could walk around without stirring up the dust. During the summer of 1979, Thomas spent the time reanalyzing the artifacts that were never published by S.M. Wheeler’s excavations. During this time, he was able to come to the conclusion that Hidden Cave was used solely for storage year round. He also discovered close to two-dozen prehistoric storage pits. There was a series of stratigraphic layers that also helped to identify the climate the past 10,000 years. There was proof of high and low levels of Lake Lahontan, wet and dry climates, volcanic activity, and human inhabitant usage in the cave.

== The discoveries ==
Five burials were discovered in the cave. These burials show evidence for deliberate placement. The main artifact category discovered were food remains including the pinon nuts mixed with cattail pollen. Pinon nuts are harvested in the fall whereas cattail pollen was available only in mid-summer. Bulrush seeds were also found, whose fruits are harvested six weeks after cattail pollen around the same time as the Pinon nut. Pinon nuts and bulrush are also not harvested in the same region. The combination of these three artifacts found together show that they must have been stored in the cave given their different season of occurrence.

Along with just the vegetal artifacts, bone, shell, and wooden artifacts found most still fully intact, which implies they were left there for a reason, possibly for later use. There was an assortment of bone artifacts: flakes, perforated, and pendants as well as was 49 sharpened projectile points made from antler and animal bones. The pendants consisted of shaped bone. There were 143 shell artifacts consisting of clam and olivella shells. The shells were mainly used as beads. Wooden tools were very common. There was an assortment of 63 wooden weapon parts such as fore shafts, atlatls, and other weaponry pieces. Some wooden tools were located near hearths of which were eight discovered in the excavation.

=== Human latrine ===
A human latrine was discovered in the cave 1951 that contained coprolites. Their contents help prove that people during this time ate both pinon nuts and bulrush fruits at the same time even though they were not located near each other. The contents were used to infer the possibility that a 'second harvest' strategy was employed as a way to obtain undigested seeds from feces. This is a survival strategy used in times where little food resources were available.

== Today ==
Today, the Grimes Point area is a destination for hikers and wildlife enthusiasts, and is known for its accessible petroglyphs. The cave is 150 feet (46 m) deep and about 200 feet (61 m) wide. Guided expeditions to the Hidden Cave site are sponsored by The Churchill County Museum and the Bureau of Land Management. A larger entrance has been created by engineers from the Bureau of Land Management so that visitors no longer have to crawl into the cave.
