= Rudhall of Gloucester =

English bellfounder

Rudhall of Gloucester was a family business of bell founders in the city of Gloucester, England, who between 1684 and 1835 cast more than 5,000 bells.

== History ==
There had been a tradition of bell casting in Gloucester since before the 14th century.

The family business was founded by Abraham Rudhall (1657–1736) who developed a method of tuning bells by turning on a lathe rather than the traditional chipping method with a chisel. One of the earliest ring of bells he cast was for St Nicholas' Church, Oddington in 1684. He came to be described as the greatest bell-founder of his age. The business was continued by his eldest son, also called Abraham (1680–1735), his son Abel (1714–60), and three of Abel's sons, Thomas (?1740–83), Charles (1746–1815) and John (1760–1835). In 1815 John Rudhall was declared bankrupt and the bell foundry bought by Mears & Stainbank who owned the Whitechapel Bell Foundry. The business formally closed in 1828 but bells bearing John's name have been found with dates up to 1835.

== Selected bells ==
Five bells cast in 1702 by Abraham Rudhall I hang in St James the Great, West Hanney, Oxfordshire. A sixth was recast in 1856.

In 1706 and 1707 Abraham Rudhall I cast three of the bells of Great Malvern Priory. (Note: Another of the bells dates to 1350–1380, possibly by John of Gloucester. "The Priory Bells". Great Malvern Priory.)

In 1710 Abraham Rudhall I cast six bells for SS Michael and Wulfhad's church in Stone, Staffordshire. In 2012 the four heaviest bells, including the tenor, were re-hung in the church but the other two were replaced by new bells cast by the Whitechapel Bell Foundry. The two redundant bells were moved to St Michael's Tower, Gloucester, near to where they were cast.

Three of the bells of St Mary Magdalene, Adlestrop were cast by Abraham Rudhall I in 1711.

Six of the bells in the Church of St Leonard, Middleton, Greater Manchester were cast by Abraham Rudhall I in 1714.

Five of the bells of St Michael and All Angels, Great Torrington were cast by Abraham Rudhal I in 1716.

Six of the bells in Pershore Abbey were cast in 1729 by Abraham Rudhall II: a seventh (also 1727) was recast in 1897.

Six bells by Abel Rudhall (cast in 1738 and 1753) hang in Christ Church Cathedral, Dublin.

Eight change ringing bells (tenor: 13 long cwt 3 qr 5 lb (1,545 lb or 701 kg) in F) at Old North Church in Boston were cast by Abel Rudhall in 1744 and hung in 1745. One bell has the inscription: "We are the first ring of bells cast for the British Empire in North America, A.R. 1744."

All eight bells from the Church of St Anne, Shandon, an iconic symbol of Cork, Ireland, were cast by Abel Rudhall in 1750, although they were recast twice in 1865 and 1906.

Four bells of Saint Fin Barre's Cathedral, Cork, including the tenor, remain from the ring of eight cast by Abel Rudhall in 1751.

Five bells cast by Abel Rudhall in 1757 still hang in Wells Cathedral.

Bells cast in 1762 by Thomas Rudhall hang in St George's, Kelmscott, Oxfordshire.
