= St Michael and All Angels, Great Torrington =

Church of St Michael and All Angels
- Church of St Michael
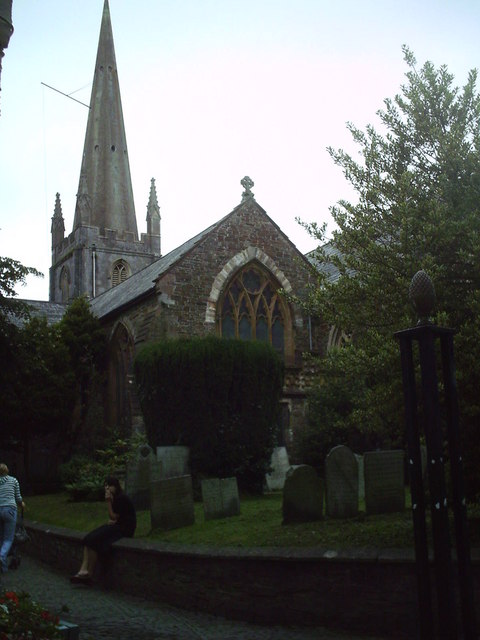
- Church and churchyard
- Church of St Michael and All Angels
- 50.9525°N 4.1439°W
- OS grid reference: SS 49505 19196
- Location: Church Walk, Great Torrington, Devon, EX38 8BN
- Country: England
- Denomination: Church of England
- Previous denomination: Roman Catholic Church
- Churchmanship: Traditional Catholic
- Website: Parish website

History
- Status: Active
- Dedication: St Michael and All Angels

Architecture
- Functional status: Parish church
- Heritage designation: Grade II*
- Designated: 19 March 1951

Administration
- Diocese: Diocese of Exeter
- Archdeaconry: Archdeaconry of Barnstaple
- Deanery: Torrington
- Parish: Great Torrington

Clergy
- Bishop: The Rt Revd Dr Mike Harrison (Bishop) - Bishop of Exeter
- Rector: Fr Steve Turner

The Church of St Michael and All Angels is a Church of England parish church in Great Torrington, Devon. It has been a Grade II* listed building since 1951.

As a traditional catholic parish.

== History ==
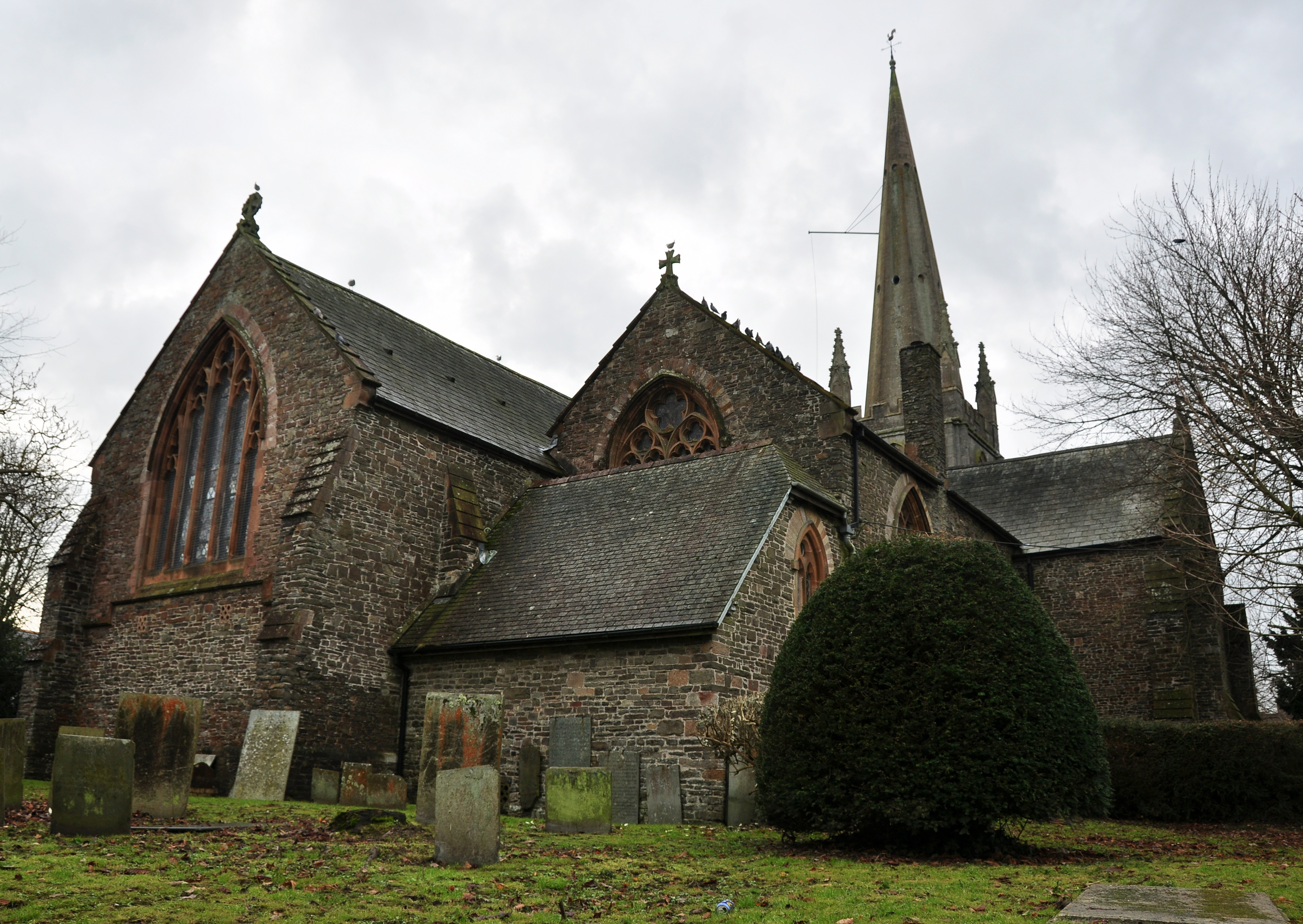
The church from the west

The earliest record of a parish church in Torrington is of 1259, when a vicar was appointed, but there was probably an earlier church on the site. The oldest surviving parts of the building date to the 13th or 14th century.

In February 1646 the bell tower was blown up in the Battle of Torrington, a battle of the First English Civil War. The Royalists who held the town had stored some 80 barrels of gunpowder in the church. The Parliamentarians as they captured the town shut their prisoners in the church and somehow the powder was detonated with great loss of life. The blast is believed to have come from the south transept (the old tower) in a north-westerly direction, destroying several pillars and the fire that followed destroyed old furnishings and monuments. The church had to be rebuilt and this was completed in 1651.

== Design ==
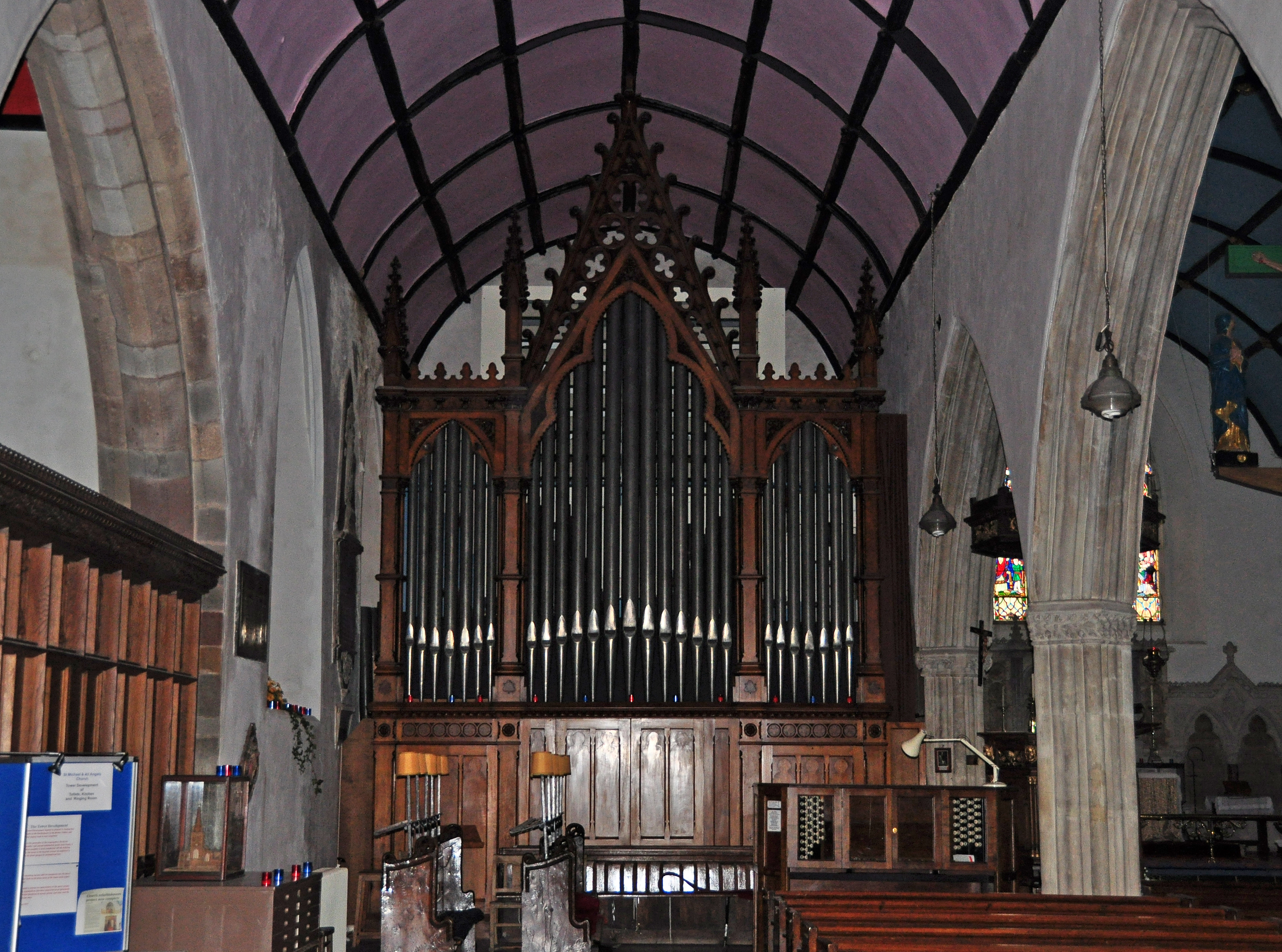
The Willis Organ

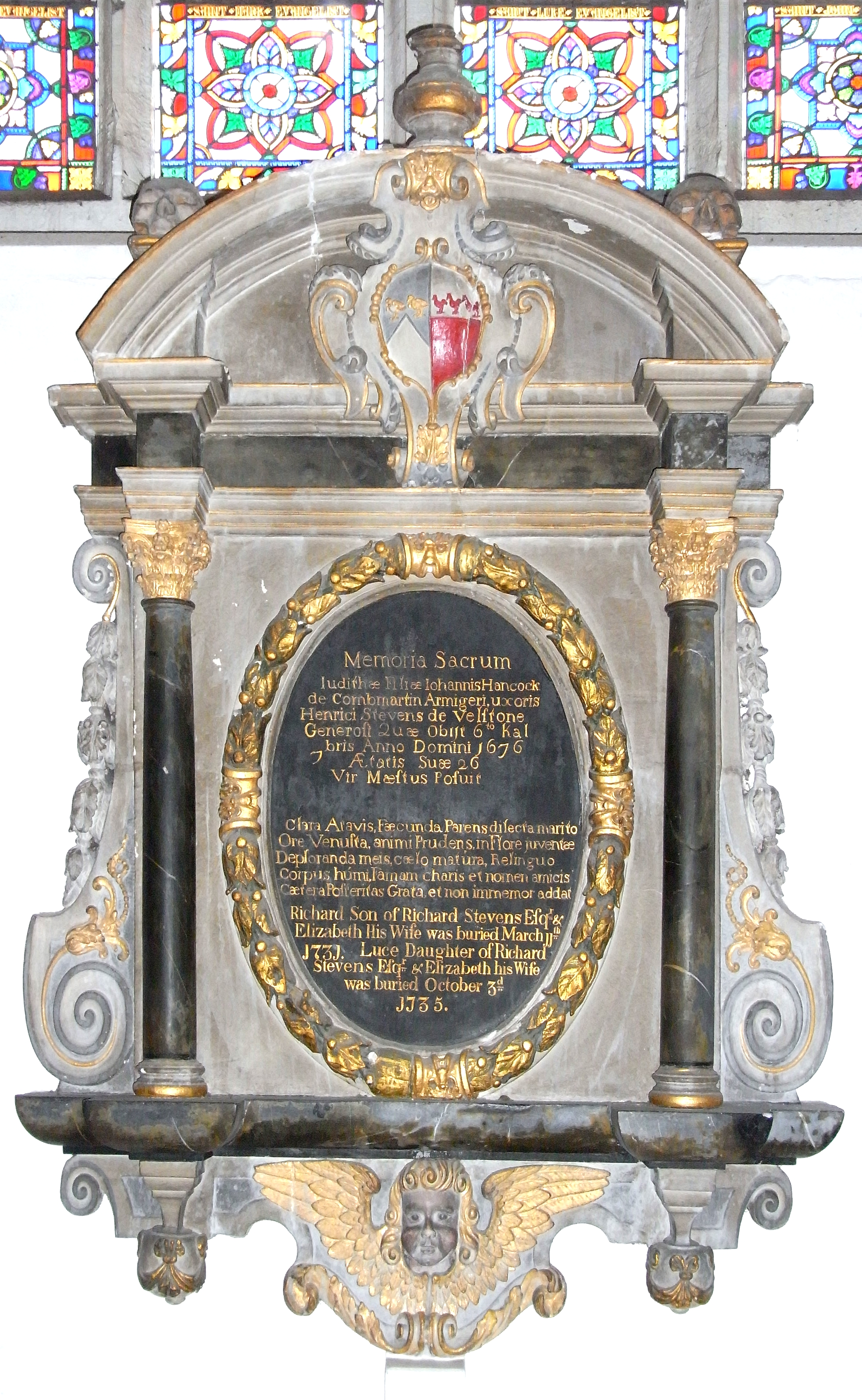
Memorial monument to Judith Hancock Stevens

The fine wagon roof is of a pattern typical for this part of England, while the window tracery to the nave, aisles and chancel are Geometric dating to about 1861 and are by William White. The current tower and spire date were completed in 1828.

The tower has a ring of eight bells. Abraham Rudhall of Gloucester cast five of them in 1716. They were rehung in 1884. John Taylor & Co of Loughborough cast the tenor, treble and second bells in 1934. The clock bell from the old tower was cast in 1632. It survived the explosion of 1646 and now hangs in the spire.

The carved octagonal red-veined marble baptismal font with its quatrefoil panels was made in 1914. Opposite this in an oak cabinet is an original wax impression of the Great Seal of England from the reign of James I. This was probably once attached to the Charter granted to the borough in this reign and was restored at the Victoria and Albert Museum in 1929. The war memorial contains fragments of glass salvaged from Westminster Chapter House after bomb damage during World War II. Around the church are a beautiful set of the Stations of the Cross which originally belonged to a convent chapel and which were given to the church by an anonymous donor.

On the north wall are two monuments, one to Mrs Penelope Johnson and another to Mrs Palmer (partly behind the organ), both of whom were relations of Sir Joshua Reynolds. He used to regularly visit them, and on one occasion brought the great Dr Samuel Johnson with him. The Willis Organ is one of the finest in the West Country and is the twin of the organ in Truro Cathedral. The pulpit with its carved cherubs, wreaths and gilding is typically 17th-century. During the restoration of 1861-64 (when the old galleries and box pews were removed) the pulpit was moved and the matching sounding board was thrown out. The latter was rescued from a builder's yard and given to the Victoria and Albert Museum in London. There it remained until 1960 when it was restored to the church "on loan".

The Crucifix on the pillar behind the pulpit was carved at Oberammergau in 1934 by Willy Bierling, who played St John the Evangelist in the Oberammergau Passion Play that year. The rood hanging in the chancel arch was added in 2002 and was formerly in St Oswald's Church, Small Heath in Birmingham where it had been given as a war memorial. The stone and marble reredos was made in 1878 and is carved with a relief of the Last Supper by the sculptor Harry Hems. The wooden figure of the Virgin Mary to the right of the altar steps was carved by French nuns, while the bronze figure of St Michael to the right of the chancel steps is by Mother Concordia of St Mildred's Abbey in Thanet. At the east end of the south aisle is a small Tudor room that survived the 1646 blast and now used as the vestry; this may be the Tudor library mentioned in records, the books from which have long disappeared.

== Chapel of St James ==
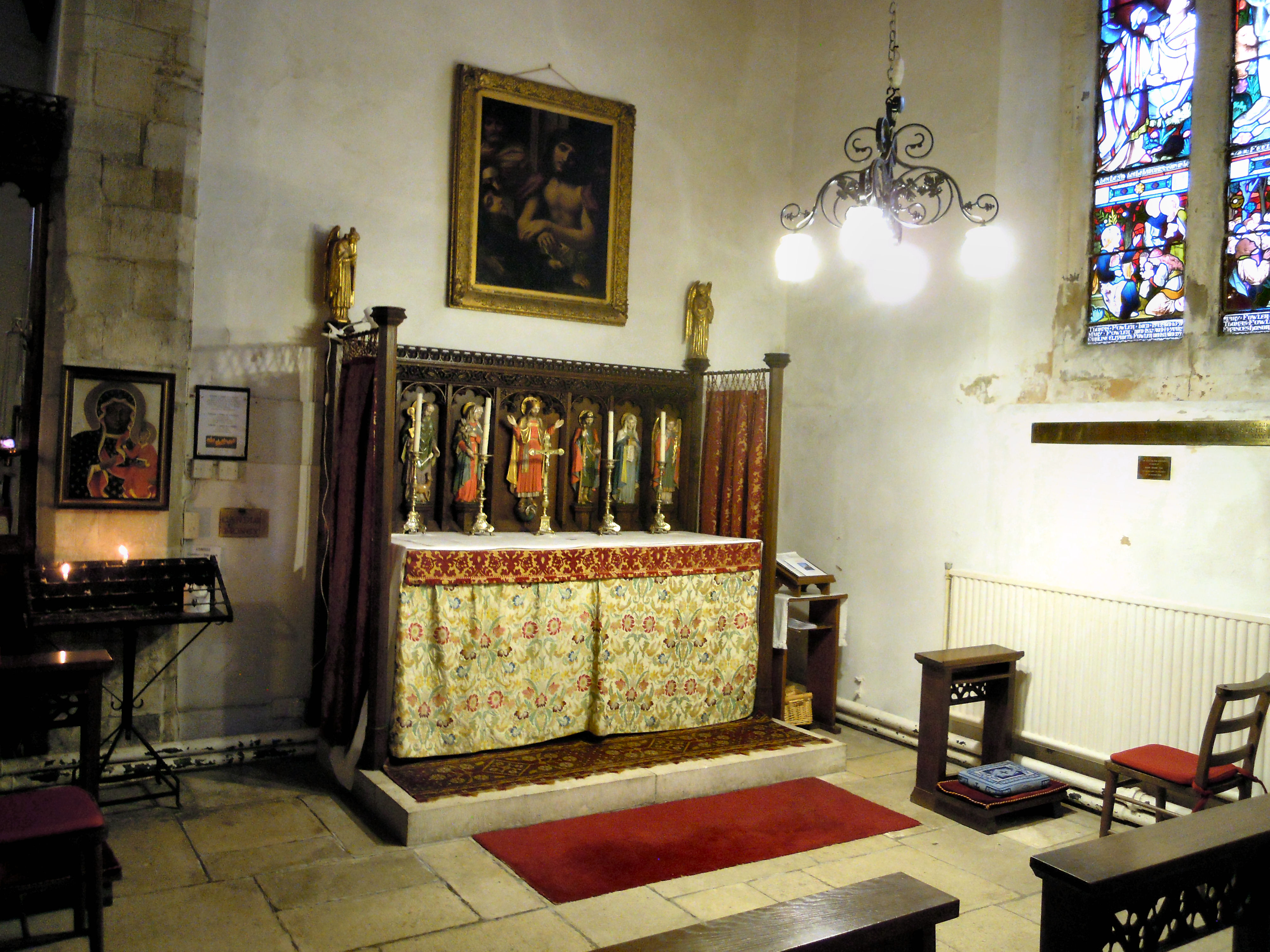
The Chapel of St James

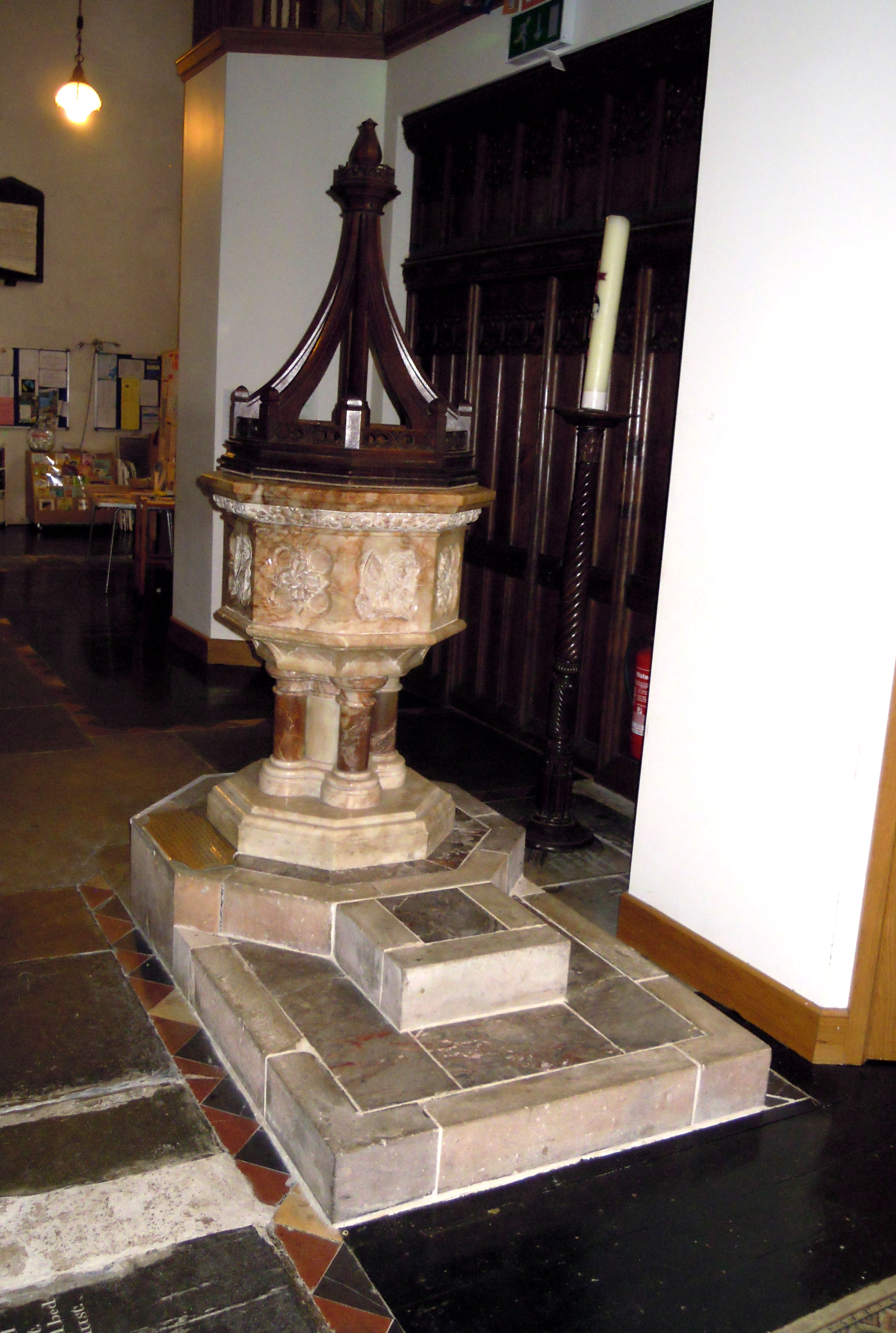
The font made in 1914

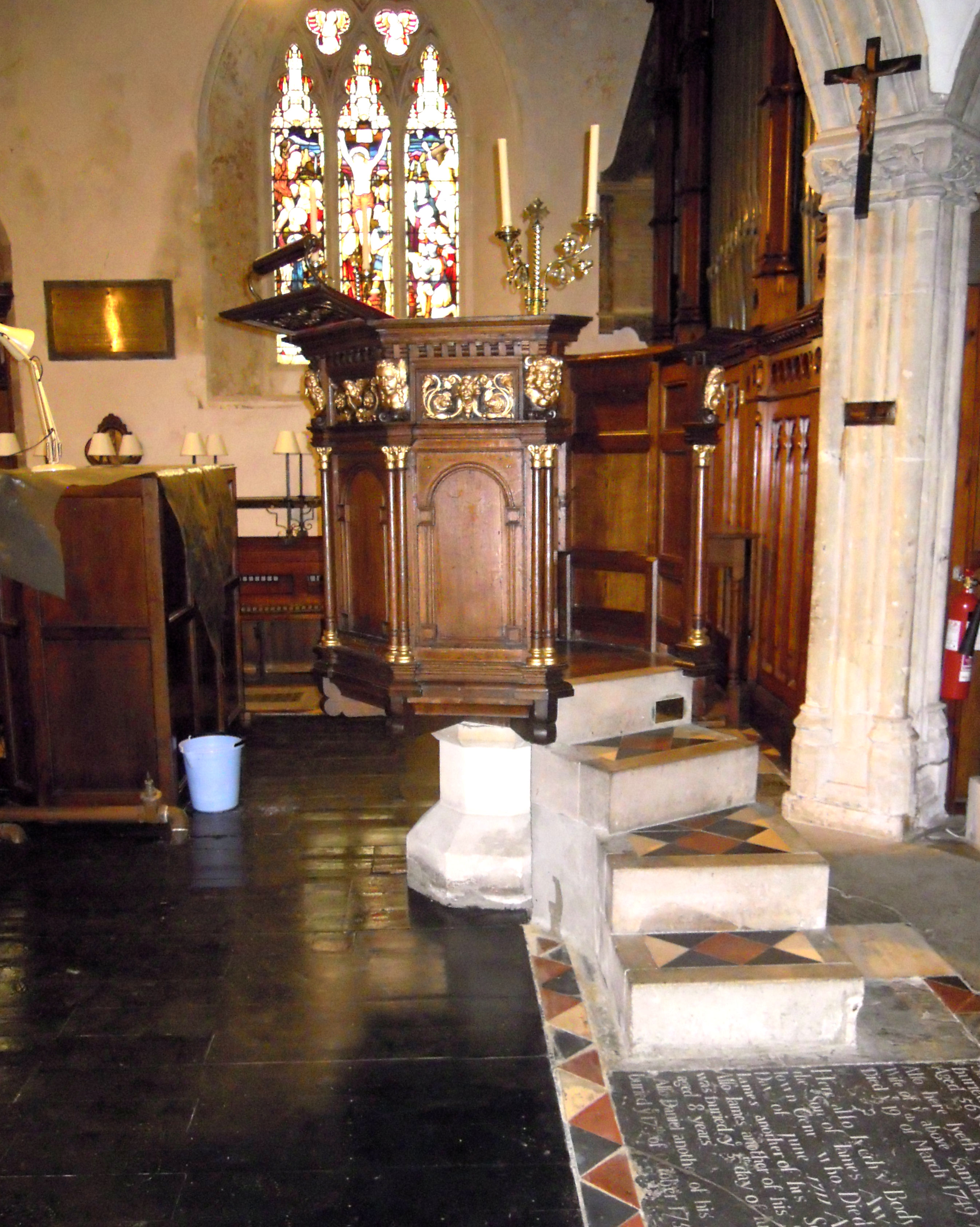
The pulpit is typically 17th-century

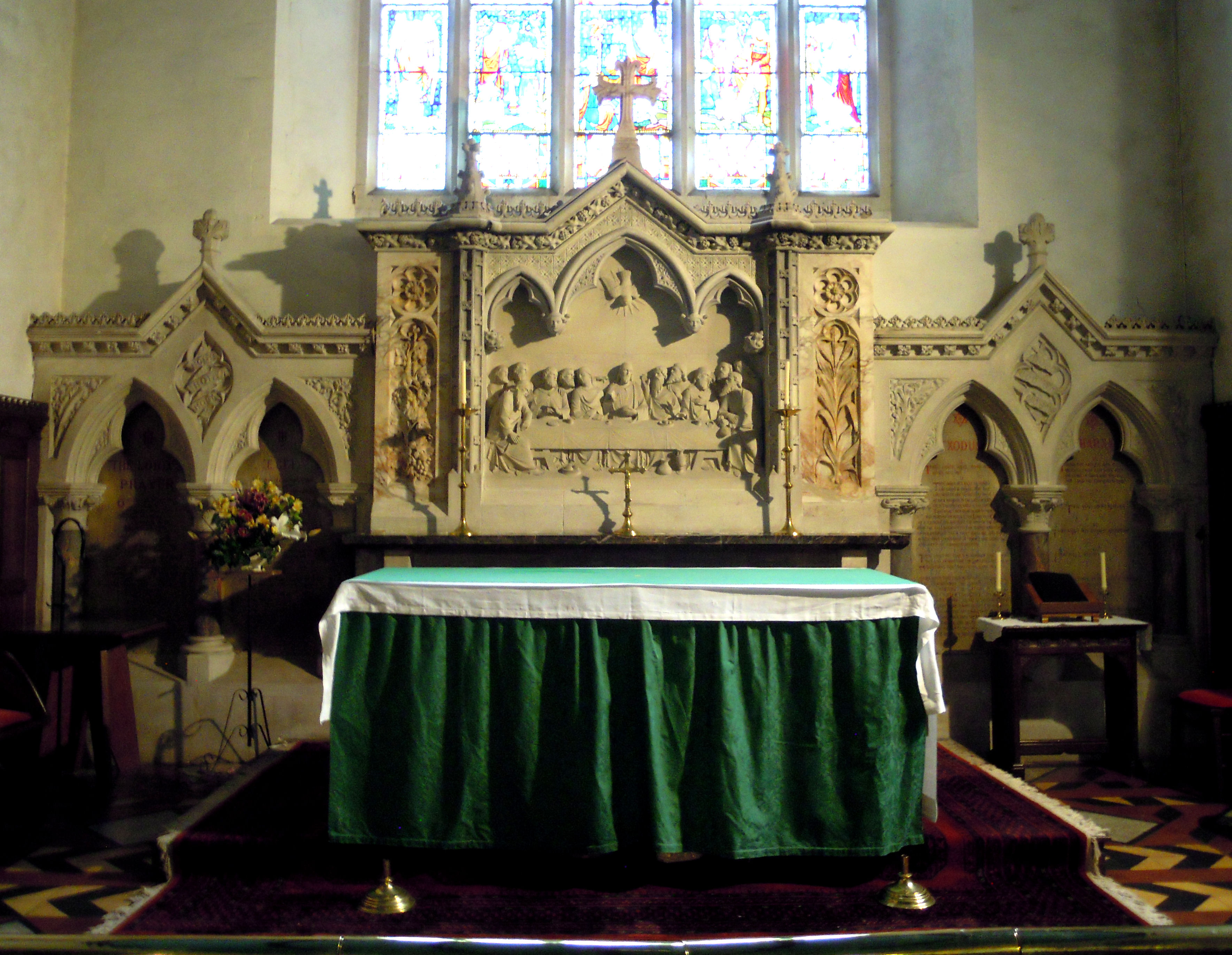
The stone and marble reredos made in 1878

The Chapel of St James in the South Transept is named after the demolished chapel at Torrington Castle, and was furnished as a memorial to Frank Emlyn Jones, Vicar 1894-1934 and latterly Archdeacon of Barnstaple. This is where the original tower stood before the rebuilding of the early 19th century. The chapel altar is 17th-century, while the figures on the reredos are (from left to right): St Michael (for Great Torrington), St Giles (for Little Torrington), St Mary the Virgin, St James, St Mary Magdalene (for Taddiport), and St Gabriel (for St Gabriel's Mission in the town, which no longer exists). The oil painting above the altar is a copy of Caravaggio's 'Ecce Homo'. The icon to the left of the altar is a version of Our Lady of Częstochowa, the original being in Poland. It hangs here as a result of a court case which made legal history. The Chancellor of the Diocese, David Calcutt, refused permission for its installation but in 1984 the parish appealed to the Court of Ecclesiastical Causes Reserved, which had never sat before, and the Chancellor's decision was reversed. The window in the chapel is a memorial to the apothecary and inventor Thomas Fowler. The border shows two of his inventions: the thermosiphon (the founder of the central heating systems) and a calculating machine, a forerunner of the modern computer, and which was admired by his contemporary Charles Babbage.

== Exterior ==
Some of the victims of the 1646 blast lie in a mass grave under the cobbled mound opposite the main entrance, while a stone commemorating the disaster is to the entrance's right. The current tower and spire were built in 1828, about which time the old tower was taken down. The tower is the work of W.B. Cock, a local builder who also designed the nearby Pannier Market; his initials are set into the cobbles of the path outside the South West door. The carved stone heads by the West door are 19th-century and represent Cardinal Thomas Wolsey and Lady Margaret Beaufort, the mother of Henry VII. The churchyard has been closed to burials since 1850.

== Notable clergy ==
- Thomas Wolsey, Tudor courtier, Archbishop of York, and Cardinal in the Roman Catholic Church, held the rectorship
- Hugh Peter, preacher, political advisor and soldier who supported the Parliamentary cause during the English Civil War
- William Keble Martin, author of Concise British Flora in Colour, served as vicar from 1934 to 1943.

== Bibliography ==
- Pevsner, Nikolaus; Cherry, Bridget (1989) [1952]. Devon. The Buildings of England. Harmondsworth: Penguin Books. pp. 460–461. ISBN 0-14-071050-7.
