= David Hurst Thomas =

American anthropologist

David Hurst Thomas (born 1945) is the curator of North American Archaeology in the Division of Anthropology at the American Museum of Natural History and a professor at Richard Gilder Graduate School. He was previously a chairman of the American Museum of Natural History's Anthropology Division.

== Career ==
Thomas was born and raised in California, and after initially wanting to major in pre-med, ended up receiving all of his degrees in anthropology (including a Ph.D. in 1971) from the University of California, Davis instead. He is one of the founding trustees for the National Museum of the American Indian at the Smithsonian Institution, was elected to the National Academy of Sciences in 1989, and received the Presidential Recognition Award from the Society for American Archaeology.

During his 35-year tenure at the AMNH, Thomas has published dozens of books, ranging from technical site reports to widely used popular textbooks and has been involved in archaeological fieldwork throughout North America. His best known projects include excavations at the Gatecliff Rockshelter in Nevada, which is the deepest stratified rockshelter in North America; on St. Catherines Island in Georgia, where he discovered the site of the Franciscan mission Santa Catalina de Guale; and the Spanish mission south of Santa Fe, New Mexico.

Thomas's academic research is varied, with concentrations on the human response to environmental change in the Great Basin, as well as the consequences of Spanish exploration and colonization of the South on indigenous people in the region.

One of Thomas's main foci is the relationship between Native American and anthropological communities. He has written extensively about the lawsuit against the federal government that prevented the repatriation of the Kennewick Man remains and has worked to support positive relationships between the scientific and native communities in North America. He believes that if better working relationships had been established before and during the Kennewick case, both sides could have come to an agreement without taking it to the level of the federal courts.

Thomas is a major supporter of Native American Graves Protection and Repatriation Act (NAGPRA) and is sympathetic to Native American rights. The NAGPRA is legislation passed in November 1990 recognizing that Native American people have a special stake in the history of this country, and that museums have acquired items that are inappropriate (human remains, grave goods, items of cultural patrimony), that tribes need to be notified by museums with these items in their collections, and that decisions have to be made by both sides about repatriation. The law also applies to new finds, so that there are rules that apply to federal/state/Indian lands where artifacts are found as well.

Thomas is also known as an educator and proponent of public involvement in archaeology. In addition to the many textbooks that he has written or co-authored, he is also actively involved in public outreach through the AMNH, and has helped produce a children's television show, called DIGS, that introduces kids (and their parents) to the discipline of archaeology in an easy to understand, fun, “hands-on” way. He has held several university positions and he has also made a major contribution to the field (and managed to start his own academic lineage) by acting as a mentor to one of the current top names in hunter-gatherer archaeology. Robert Kelly, who worked as a volunteer with Thomas at Gatecliff Rockshelter as a teenager, has published numerous books and articles, has been voted president of the Society for American Archaeology, is currently head of the Anthropology Department at the University of Wyoming, and has mentored dozens of students himself in a relatively short period of time.

== Published works ==
- Archaeology, 6th edition (2013)
- St. Catherines: An Island in Time (2011, 1988)
- Skull Wars: Kennewick Man, Archaeology, and the Battle for Native American Identity (2001, 2000)
- Exploring Ancient Native America: An Archaeological Guide (1994)
- Native North America (2000)

== See also ==
- Hidden Cave, an archaeological site in the Great Basin excavated by David H. Thomas
