= Samuel Fowler =

Samuel Fowler may refer to:

- Samuel Fowler (1779–1844), New Jersey congressman from 1833 to 1837
- Samuel Fowler (1851–1919), New Jersey congressman from 1889 to 1893
- Samuel Fowler (cricketer) (1854–1915), New Zealand cricketer
- J. Samuel Fowler (1874–1961), New York politician
