= Raymond Fowler =

Raymond Fowler may refer to:

- Raymond D. Fowler (1930–2015), American psychologist
- Raymond E. Fowler (born 1933), American ufologist
- Raymond Fowler, a character in the British television sitcom The Thin Blue Line
