= John Fowler (cricketer) =

New Zealand cricketer

Personal information
- Full name: John Joseph Fowler
- Born: 1 December 1850; Nelson, New Zealand
- Died: 30 November 1910 (aged 59); Nelson, New Zealand
- Batting: Left-handed
- Bowling: Underarm right-arm

Domestic team information
- Years: Team
- 1873-74 to 1881-82: Canterbury

Career statistics
Competition	First-class
Matches	7
Runs scored	196
Batting average	21.77
100s/50s	0/1
Top score	65
Balls bowled	108
Wickets	2
Bowling average	19.00
5 wickets in innings	0
10 wickets in match	0
Best bowling	2/30
Catches/stumpings	4/0
- Source: CricketArchive, 24 July 2020

John Joseph Fowler (1 December 1850 – 30 November 1910) was a New Zealand cricketer who played first-class cricket for Canterbury from 1873 to 1882.

Fowler was a middle-order batsman and excellent fieldsman. His highest score in first-class cricket was 65, the highest score on either side, when Canterbury beat Otago in 1879–80. Born in Nelson, he was the only New Zealand-born member of Canterbury's fifteen-man team that beat the touring Australians in 1877–78.

He died in hospital in Nelson after a long illness, one day before his 60th birthday. He was survived by his daughters.
