= Mill Canyon =

Natural landmark in Nevada (United States)

Coordinates: 40.2051974°N 116.5873057°W

Mill Canyon is a valley in the U.S. state of Nevada.

Mill Canyon was named for a mill which operated in the valley in the 1860s.
