= Martin Fowler =

Martin Fowler may refer to:

- Martin Fowler (footballer) (born 1957), English footballer
- Martin Fowler (software engineer) (born 1963), British information technology author and speaker
- Martin Fowler (EastEnders), starting 1985, fictional soap opera character
