= Dennis Fowler =

Dennis L. Fowler is the Vice President and Medical Director for Perioperative Services at NewYork-Presbyterian Hospital/Columbia University Medical Center. He is a pioneer in the field of endoscopic surgery and has been the first to perform numerous innovative laparoscopic surgical procedures, never before accomplished (NYP). Fowler was also the first general surgeon to use the Harmonic Scalpel (NY Magazine), a device that uses wave frequency (instead of electric current) to divide the tissue and vibration to coagulate blood vessels (Outpatient Surgery Magazine).

== Innovative surgical procedures, not previously accomplished laparoscopically ==
- Laparoscopic Sigmoid Resection, 1990
- Laparoscopic Gastroenterostomy, 1991
- Laparoscopic Truncal Vagotomy, Antrectomy, and Billroth II, 1991
- Laparoscopic Resection of Benign Submucosal Gastric Tumor, 1991
- Laparoscopic Transduodenal Sphincteroplasty of the Minor Papilla, 1998

== Selected publications ==
- Comparison of Two Composite Meshes using Two Fixation Devices in a Porcine Laparoscopic Ventral Hernia Repair Model. Duffy AJ, Hogle NJ, LaPerle KM, Fowler DL. Hernia, 2004.
- More than a numbers game: credentialing for minimally invasive procedures. Fowler DL, Bailey R, Ikramuddin S, Wexner S. Published as a symposium, Fowler DL as moderator. Cont Surg, 60: 103–112, 2004.
- In-Vivo Stereoscopic Imaging System with 5 Degrees-of-Freedom for Minimal Access Surgery. Miller A, Allen P, Fowler DL. MMVR 12 (Proceedings), 234–240. IOS Press, 2004.
