= James Fowler =

James Fowler may refer to:

== Politics ==
- James Fowler (Massachusetts politician) (1788–1873), American lawyer and politician
- James Fowler (Australian politician) (1863–1940), member of the Australian House of Representatives, 1901–1922
- James D. Fowler (born 1934), member of the Illinois House of Representatives

== Other ==
- James Fowler (architect) (1828–1892), English ecclesiastical architect
- James Fowler (footballer) (born 1980), Scottish football player and manager
- James Alexander Fowler (1863–1955), American lawyer
- James Bonard Fowler (1933–2015), Alabama state trooper convicted of shooting unarmed civil rights protester Jimmie Lee Jackson
- James H. Fowler (born 1970), political science professor at the University of California, San Diego
- James Kingston Fowler (1852–1934), British physician
- James L. Fowler (1931–2015), Korean and Vietnam War veteran
- James W. Fowler (1940–2015), theology professor at Emory University
- Jim Fowler (1930–2019), American zoologist and television host

== See also ==
- James Fowler High School, high school in Calgary
