= Catherine Fowler (film and media academic) =

Film researcher at University of Otago in New Zealand

- Born: 1969

Academic background
- Education: University of Warwick
- Thesis: The films of Chantal Akerman: a cinema of displacements (1995)

Catherine Fowler (born 1969) is a New Zealand academic, and is a full professor at the University of Otago, specialising in historical and contemporary film studies.

== Academic career ==
Fowler completed a PhD titled The films of Chantal Akerman: a cinema of displacements at the University of Warwick in 1995. Fowler lectured on film studies for ten years at Southampton Institute of Higher Education (now known as Solent University), where she also set up and led a master's programme in independent film and filmmaking. Fowler then joined the faculty of the University of Otago, rising to associate professor in 2014 and full professor in 2022. From 1994 to 1998, Fowler was screen correspondent for the Créteil International Women's Film Festival.

Fowler has written books on British film director Sally Potter and the Chantal Akerman film Jeanne Dielman, 23, quai du commerce, 1080 Bruxelles.

Fowler was awarded a Fulbright Scholarship to visit UCLA, Yale and Harvard Universities to talk about video art. In 2014 Fowler was runner-up in the 2014 British Association for Film, Television and Screen Studies prize for best article, for her article Remembering Cinema “elsewhere”: From Retrospection to Introspection in the Gallery Film. The judges described Fowler's essay as an "insightful analysis of moving image installations that utilise and reflect on sequences from existing films suggests new ways of thinking about our engagement with cinema history, and provides an interesting intervention into contemporary debates around the notion of cinephilia."

== Selected works ==
=== Books and edited books ===
- Fowler, C. (Ed.). (2002). The European cinema reader. London, UK: Routledge, 255p
- Fowler, C. & Helfield, G. (Eds.). (2006). Representing the rural: Space, place, and identity in films about the land. Detroit, MI: Wayne State University Press, 384p.
- Fowler, C. (2008). Sally Potter. Champaign, IL: University of Illinois Press, 168p.
- Fowler, C. (2013) Jeanne Dielman, 23, quai du commerce, 1080 Bruxelles. Bloomsbury Publishing. ISBN 9781839022821
- Higgins, T., & Fowler, C. (Eds.). (2023). Epistolary entanglements in film, media and the visual arts. Amsterdam, The Netherlands: Amsterdam University Press, 280p. doi: 10.5117/9789463729666

=== Journal articles ===
- Fowler, Catherine (2012). "Remembering Cinema "Elsewhere": From Retrospection to Introspection in the Gallery Film". Journal of Cinema and Media Studies. 51 (2): 26–45. doi:10.1353/cj.2012.0008. Wikidata Q125167631.
- Fowler, Catherine (2008). "Into the light: re‐considering off‐frame and off‐screen space in gallery films". New Review of Film and Television Studies. 6 (3): 253–267. doi:10.1080/17400300802418578. Wikidata Q125456876.
- Fowler, Catherine (2013). "The Clock: Gesture and Cinematic Replaying". Framework. 54 (2): 226–242. doi:10.1353/frm.2013.0020. Wikidata Q125167618.
