= John Gordon Fowler =

United States Air Force general

- Born: September 6, 1905; Chicago, Illinois, U.S.
- Died: December 8, 1971 (aged 66)
- Military career
- Allegiance: United States of America
- Branch: United States Air Force
- Service years: 1929-1959
- Rank: Brigadier general
- Conflicts: World War II
- Awards: Bronze Star; Legion of Merit

John Gordon Fowler (September 6, 1905 – December 8, 1971) was a United States Air Force brigadier general who was a recipient of the Legion of Merit.

== Biography ==
=== Early life ===
Fowler was born in Chicago, Illinois in 1905. In 1924 he graduated from Lake View High School in the same city, and four years later got a degree in engineering from Northwestern University. He entered Primary Flying School as a flying cadet at March Field, California and later on was transferred to the Advanced Flying School at Kelly Field, Texas, from which he graduated on June 22, 1929, and the same year became second lieutenant. In October of the same year he was a pilot at Selfridge Field, Michigan. Between 1930 and 1940 he was a flying instructor and pilot at more than one base of the United States and Hawaii. In July 1940 he entered into the Air Corps Tactical School at Maxwell Field, Alabama from which he graduated in September of the same year and was given a task to command Second Bomb Group at Langley Field, Virginia.

=== World War II ===
When World War II began, he became an assistant chief of staff for the Anti-Submarine Command in New York City where he also became deputy chief of staff for the First Air Force at Mitchel Field, New York in October 1943. In June 1944 Fowler worked with the 20th Air Force at Colorado Springs, Colorado where he operated 314th Bomb Wing which was sent by him to Guam. In September 1945, he took command of the 20th Air Force Combat Staging Center at Iwo Jima and a month later he became commanding officer of the 315th Bomb Wing.

=== Postwar era ===
On July 1, 1946, he worked for the Japan Air Materiel Area Command as chief of administration. In August 1947 Fowler became an assistant commandant of the 2621st Base Unit at Barksdale Field, Louisiana and next year he took command of the 2518th Base Unit at Enid Air Force Base, Oklahoma. Later on, in October 1949, he moved to Randolph Field, Texas where he was in charge of the 3510th Pilot Training Wing and a year later, in August, entered into the National War College in Washington, D. C. He graduated from there in June and was stationed at Joint Subsidiary Plans Division as the Air Force member.

In March 1952, Fowler became a deputy to the assistant at the Air Force Headquarters and in April he was already an assistant deputy director and became a deputy director a couple of months later. He came back to Tokyo, Japan in September 1954, and worked at the Far East Air Forces Headquarters as a deputy for intelligence. From December 1954 to June 1955 he worked in Korea as a United Nations Command, Military Armistice Commissioner and on April 17, 1956, was assigned at the United Nations and Far East Command in Tokyo. He retired in May 1959 and died on December 8, 1971.
