= Don D. Fowler =

American anthropologist and archaeologist

Don D. Fowler is an anthropologist and archaeologist in the southwestern United States. He received his undergraduate degree from the University of Utah and his PhD from the University of Pittsburgh. As a student, Fowler worked on the Glen Canyon Project, surveying the canyon for archaeological data before the Glen Canyon Dam was finished being built. The Sundance Archaeological Research Fund is just one of the archaeological projects he has directed in the Great Basin. From 1985 to 1987 Fowler was the president of the Society for American Archaeology and from 1988 to 1991 he held a Foundation Professorship from the University of Nevada, Reno. He is now the Mamie Kleberg Professor of Historic Preservation and Anthropology, Emeritus at the University of Nevada, Reno. and sits on the advisory board of The Center for Desert Archaeology.

== Awards ==
- Distinguished Graduate Medal, University of Pittsburgh (1986)
- Society for American Archaeology Lifetime Achievement Award (2003)
- Outstanding Researcher of the Year, University of Nevada, Reno (2003)

== Selected bibliography ==
- Fowler, Don D. In a Sacred Manner We Live: Photographs of the North American Indian (1972) ISBN 0-8271-7202-8
- Fowler, Don D., Robert C. Euler, and Catherine S. Fowler. John Wesley Powell and the Anthropology of the Canyon Country (1981)
- Fowler, Don D. The Western Photographs of John K. Hillers (1989) ISBN 0-87474-416-4
- Fowler, Don D. A Laboratory of Anthropology: Science and Romanticism in the American Southwest, 1846–1930 (2010) ISBN 978-1-60781-035-3
- Fowler, Don D. The Glen Canyon Country: A Personal Memoir (2011) ISBN 978-1-60781-134-3 / 978-1-60781-127-5
- Fowler, Catherine S., and Don D. Fowler. The Great Basin: People and Place in Ancient Times (2008) ISBN 978-1-930618-95-4
- Cordell, Linda S. and Don D. Fowler, eds. (2005). Southwest Archaeology in the Twentieth Century ISBN 0-87480-825-1

== See also ==
- Catherine S. Fowler
