= Catherine S. Fowler =

American anthropologist

- Born: Catherine Louise Sweeney; 1940 (age 85–86)
- Spouse: Don D. Fowler

Academic background
- Education: University of Utah (BA); University of Pittsburgh (MA, PhD)
- Thesis: Comparative Numic Ethnobiology (1972)

Academic work
- Discipline: Anthropologist
- Sub-discipline: Ethnography; Cultural anthropology; Linguistic anthropology; Ethnobiology
- Institutions: University of Nevada, Reno

Catherine "Kay" S. Fowler is an anthropologist whose work has focused on preserving the cultures of the native people of the Great Basin. She earned her PhD from the University of Pittsburgh, and from 1964 to 2007 taught at the University of Nevada, Reno, where she is now Professor Emerita.

Fowler is a research associate for the Nevada State Museum and the Smithsonian National Museum of Natural History where she has participated in the Council for the Preservation of Anthropological Records, and she has served as president of the Society of Ethnobiology. In 1995 she was named Outstanding Researcher of the Year at the University of Nevada, Reno. In 2011, she was elected to the National Academy of Sciences and the American Academy of Arts and Sciences. In 2012, Fowler received the Distinguished Ethnobiologist Award by the Society of Ethnobiology.

== Selected publications ==
- Fowler, Catherine S.; Bath, Joyce E. (1981-12-01). "Pyramid Lake Northern Paiute Fishing: The Ethnographic Record". Journal of California and Great Basin Anthropology. 3 (2): 176–186. ISSN 0191-3557.
- Fowler, Catherine S.; Walter, Nancy Peterson (1985-07-01). "Harvesting Pandora Moth Larvae with the Owens Valley Paiute". Journal of California and Great Basin Anthropology. 7 (2): 155–165. ISSN 0191-3557.
- Fowler, Catherine S.; Dawson, Lawrence E. (1986). "Ethnographic Basketry". In D' Azevedo, Warren L. (ed.). Great Basin. Handbook of North American Indians. Vol. 11. Washington: Smithsonian Institution. ISBN 978-0-16-004581-3.
- Fowler, Catherine S.; Liljeblad, Sven (1986). "Northern Paiute". In D' Azevedo, Warren L. (ed.). Great Basin. Handbook of North American Indians. Vol. 11. Washington: Smithsonian Institution. ISBN 978-0-16-004581-3.
- Fowler, Catherine S., ed. (1989). Willard Z. Park's ethnographic notes on the northern Paiute of western Nevada, 1933–1940. Anthropological papers 114. Vol. 1. Salt Lake City, Utah: University of Utah. ISBN 978-0-87480-316-7.
- Fowler, Catherine S. (2002) [1992]. In the shadow of Fox Peak : an ethnography of the Cattail-eater Northern Paiute people of Stillwater Marsh. Nevada Humanities Committee. ISBN 9781890591120.
- Fowler, Catherine S. (1992-07-01). "Cultural Anthropology and Linguistics in the Great Basin: Some proposals for the 1990s". Journal of California and Great Basin Anthropology. 14 (1): 13–21. ISSN 0191-3557.
- Fowler, Catherine S.; Fowler, Don D. (2008). The Great Basin: People and Place in Ancient Times. School for Advanced Research Press. ISBN 978-1-930618-95-4. (Winner of the 2009 New Mexico Book Award in the Anthropology/Archaeology/Science category)
- Liljeblad, Sven; Fowler, Catherine S.; Powell, Glenda, eds. (2012). The Northern Paiute-Bannock dictionary: with an English-Northern Paiute-Bannock finder list and a Northern Paiute-Bannock-English finder list. Salt Lake City, Utah: The University of Utah Press. ISBN 978-1-60781-030-8.

== See also ==
- Don D. Fowler
- Wuzzie George
