= Thomas W. Fowler =

United States Army officer

Thomas Weldon Fowler
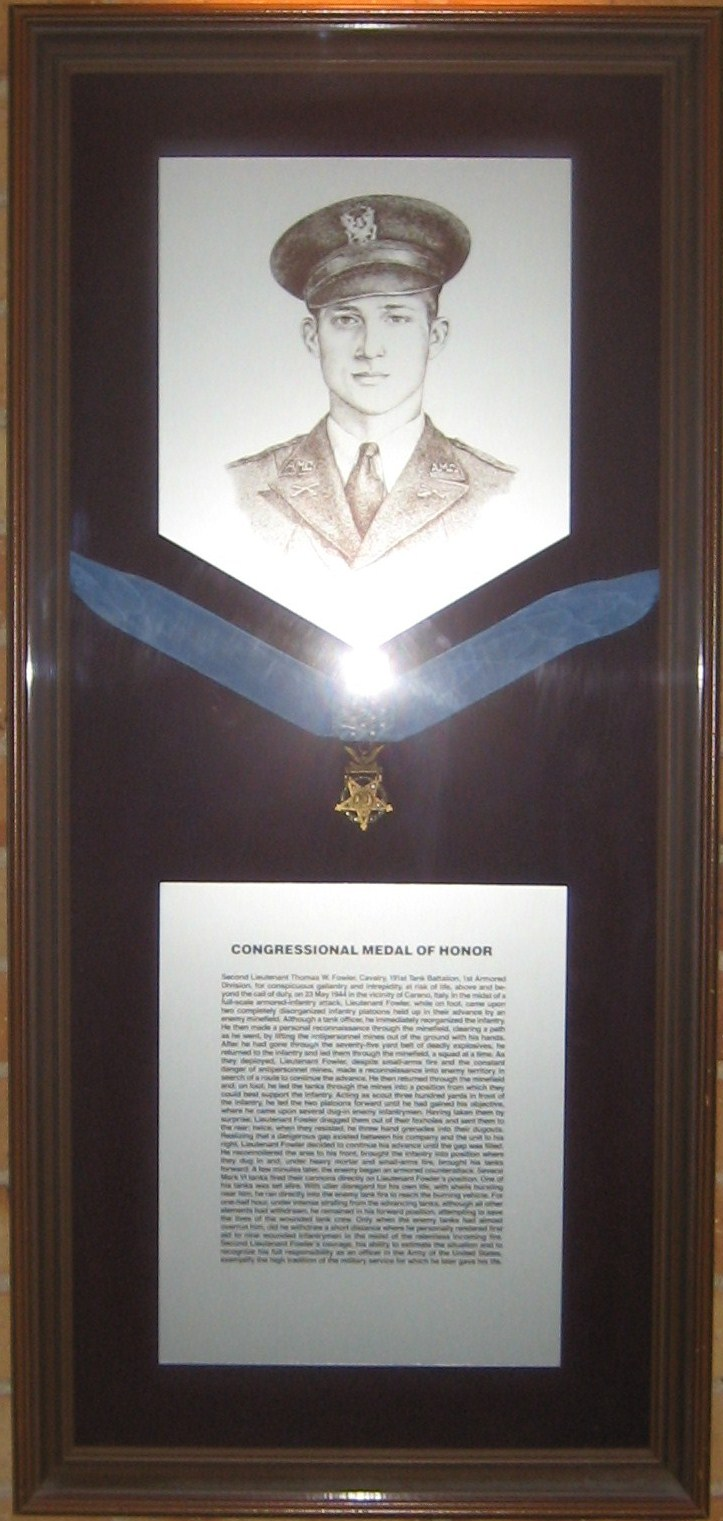
- Thomas Weldon Fowler and a specimen Medal of Honor on display at Texas A&M University
- Born: October 31, 1921; Wichita Falls, Texas
- Died: June 3, 1944 (aged 22); Carano, Italy
- Burial place: Crestview Memorial Park, Wichita Falls, Texas
- Military career
- Allegiance: United States of America
- Branch: United States Army
- Service years: 1943 – 1944
- Rank: Second Lieutenant
- Unit: 191st Tank Battalion (United States)
- Conflicts: World War II
- Awards: Medal of Honor; Purple Heart

Thomas Weldon Fowler (October 31, 1921 – June 3, 1944) was a student of the Texas A&M University, a United States Army officer, and a recipient of America's highest military decoration—the Medal of Honor—for his actions in World War II.

Fowler entered Texas A&M in September 1939, and graduated in February 1943.

Fowler joined the Army from his birth city of Wichita Falls, Texas in January 1943. After completing Officer Candidate School at Fort Knox, Kentucky, by May 23, 1944, he was serving as a Second Lieutenant in the 191st Tank Battalion. On that day, he led a combined armor-infantry attack near Carano in Aprilia, called "The Factory" by allies, near the Anzio Beachhead Italy. He was posthumously awarded the Medal of Honor on October 28, 1944, for his actions during the battle near Carano.

Thomas Weldon Fowler, aged 22 at his death, was buried in Crestview Memorial Park in his hometown of Wichita Falls, Texas, where American Legion Post 169 is named in his honor.

== Medal of Honor citation ==
Rank and organization: Second Lieutenant, U.S. Army, 1st Armored Division. Place and date: Near Carano, Italy, May 23, 1944. Entered service at: Wichita Falls, Tex. Birth: Wichita Falls, Tex. G.O. No.: 84, October 28, 1944.

Citation:

For conspicuous gallantry and intrepidity at risk of life above and beyond the call of duty, on 23 May 1944, in the vicinity of Carano, Italy. In the midst of a full-scale armored-infantry attack, 2d Lt. Fowler, while on foot, came upon 2 completely disorganized infantry platoons held up in their advance by an enemy minefield. Although a tank officer, he immediately reorganized the infantry. He then made a personal reconnaissance through the minefield, clearing a path as he went, by lifting the antipersonnel mines out of the ground with his hands. After he had gone through the 75-yard belt of deadly explosives, he returned to the infantry and led them through the minefield, a squad at a time. As they deployed, 2d Lt. Fowler, despite small arms fire and the constant danger of antipersonnel mines, made a reconnaissance into enemy territory in search of a route to continue the advance. He then returned through the minefield and, on foot, he led the tanks through the mines into a position from which they could best support the infantry. Acting as scout 300 yards in front of the infantry, he led the 2 platoons forward until he had gained his objective, where he came upon several dug-in enemy infantrymen. Having taken them by surprise, 2d Lt. Fowler dragged them out of their foxholes and sent them to the rear; twice, when they resisted, he threw hand grenades into their dugouts. Realizing that a dangerous gap existed between his company and the unit to his right, 2d Lt. Fowler decided to continue his advance until the gap was filled. He reconnoitered to his front, brought the infantry into position where they dug in and, under heavy mortar and small arms fire, brought his tanks forward. A few minutes later, the enemy began an armored counterattack. Several Mark Vl tanks fired their cannons directly on 2d Lt. Fowler's position. One of his tanks was set afire. With utter disregard for his own life, with shells bursting near him, he ran directly into the enemy tank fire to reach the burning vehicle. For a half-hour, under intense strafing from the advancing tanks, although all other elements had withdrawn, he remained in his forward position, attempting to save the lives of the wounded tank crew. Only when the enemy tanks had almost overrun him, did he withdraw a short distance where he personally rendered first aid to 9 wounded infantrymen in the midst of the relentless incoming fire. 2d Lt. Fowler's courage, his ability to estimate the situation and to recognize his full responsibility as an officer in the Army of the United States, exemplify the high traditions of the military service for which he later gave his life.

== Awards and decorations ==

1st row	Medal of Honor		Purple Heart
2nd row	American Campaign Medal	European African Middle Eastern Campaign Medal	World War II Victory Medal

== See also ==
- List of Medal of Honor recipients
- List of Medal of Honor recipients for World War II
