= Thomas Fowler (inventor) =

- Born: 1777; Great Torrington, Devon, England
- Died: 31 March 1843 (aged 65–66)

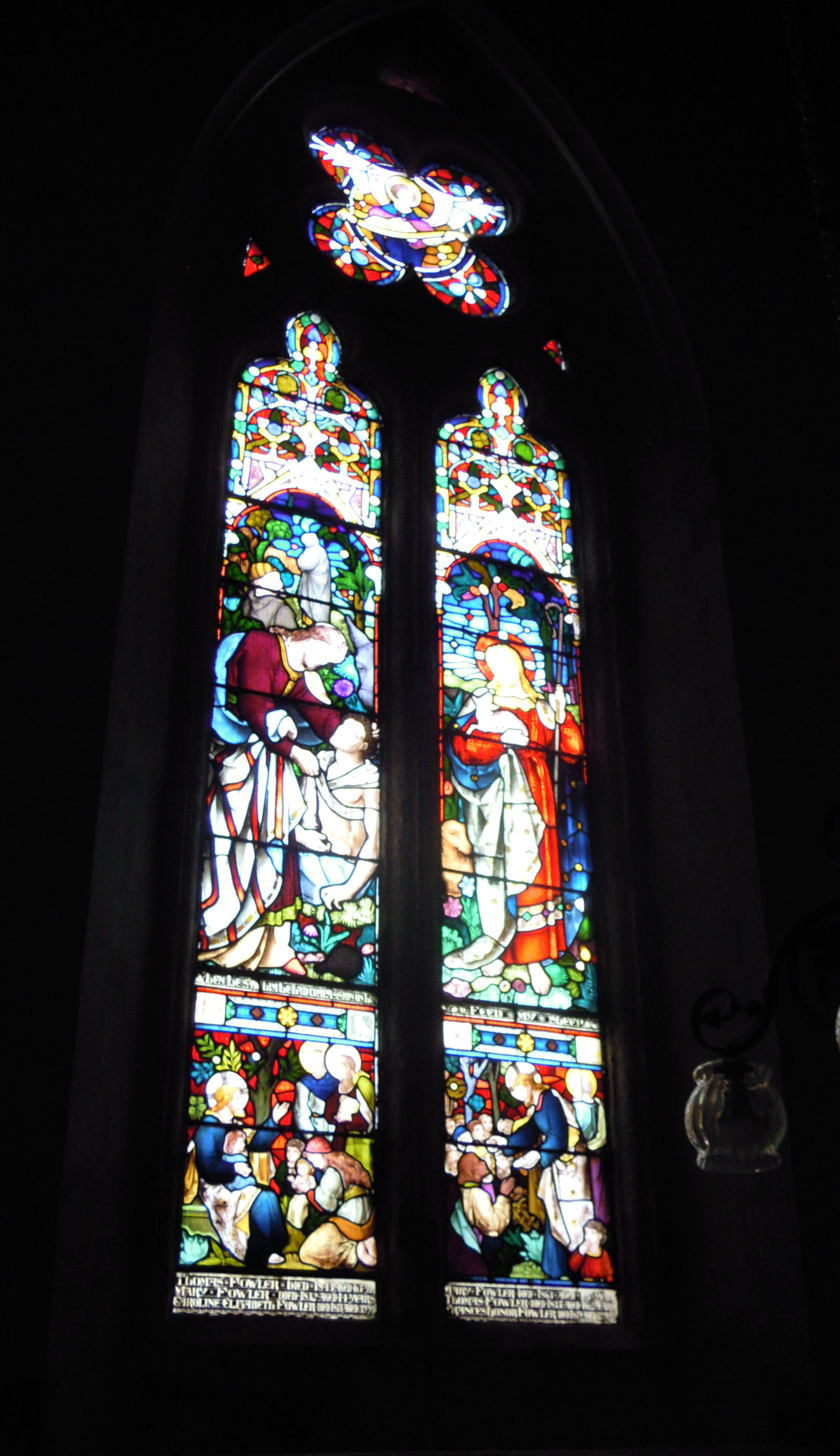
Memorial window to Thomas Fowler at the Church of St Michael and All Angels in Great Torrington

Thomas Fowler (1777 – 31 March 1843) was an English inventor whose most notable invention was the thermosiphon which formed the basis of early hot water central heating systems. He also designed and built an early mechanical calculator.

== Life ==
Much of the knowledge of Fowler comes from his son, the Reverend Hugh Fowler, who produced a biography of his father which was published in the Transactions of the Devonshire Association in 1875. He was born in 1777 in Great Torrington, Devon and lived his whole life there. His father was a cooper and he received a basic education at a local school. At about the age of 13 he was apprenticed to a fellmonger. He was largely self-taught, with a particular interest in mathematics, teaching himself from such works as John Ward's Young Mathematician's Guide and Nicholas Saunderson's work on fluxions: The Method of Fluxions. He established himself as printer and bookseller, later becoming a partner in and manager of the local bank. He was also the treasurer of the Torrington Poor Law Union. He married Mary Copp in 1813 and they had eleven children, many of whom died before reaching adulthood.

He died on 31 March 1843 of Dropsy of the Chest. Fowler has a memorial window in the Chapel of St James in the Church of St Michael and All Angels in his native Great Torrington. The window was commissioned by his son Hugh around 1864. The border shows two of his inventions: the thermosiphon and a calculating machine.

== Inventions ==
=== Thermosiphon ===
Fowler patented the thermosiphon in 1828 (British patent number 5711). It was the first convective heating system. A system based on his design was installed at Bicton, part of the Rolle Estate and received great acclaim in the Gardener's Magazine of 1829. Unfortunately due to innate flaws in the patent system of the time (under which a new version of a design with minimal changes was not covered by the original patent), the thermosiphon was copied by numerous other manufacturers and Fowler did not have sufficient funds to conduct legal proceedings.

=== Binary and Ternary Tables ===
As treasurer of the Poor Law Union, Fowler had to calculate poor law rates for each of the parishes. To do this he needed to know the value of each parish relative to the Union as a whole, and then knowing the overall fees to be collected by the entire Union, calculate the fraction that each parish owes. These calculations were made much more complicated due to the pre-decimal currency system in use the time meaning that all values had to be converted to farthings before doing any calculations and then converted back into pounds, shillings and pence afterwards. To assist with these calculations he devised a system using lower bases to simplify the calculations and in 1838 he published Tables for Facilitating Arithmetical Calculations. This contained a table of binary numbers for values from 1 to 130048, and a table of balanced ternary numbers from 1 to 3985807 along with instructions on how to use the tables to simplify the types of calculations he needed to perform.

=== Calculating machine ===
In 1840 Fowler produced a mechanical calculating machine which operated using balanced ternary arithmetic. This machine was designed to give mechanical form to the techniques described in his book, Tables for Facilitating Arithmetical Calculations. The choice of balanced ternary allowed the mechanisms to be simple, though the values had to be converted to balanced ternary before processing and the results converted back to decimal at the end of the calculation.

Apprehensive in case his ideas should again be stolen, he designed and built the machine single-handed from wood in the workshop attached to his printing business. To compensate for the limited precision achievable using wooden components, he constructed the machine on a large scale; it was 6 feet long by 3 feet deep and 1 foot high (1800 x 900 x 300 mm). The use of balanced ternary meant that the machine was not suitable for performing addition and subtraction because of the overhead of the conversion to and from base 10. It was more useful for problems (like those Thomas Fowler needed to solve as Treasurer of the Poor Law union) where there are a large number of intermediate calculations in between the conversions to and from ternary. It could perform both multiplication and division. An improved model, created in 1842 was exhibited in the museum of King's College London for a time. Fowler was advised that he should construct a new machine in metal but he was not able to afford it and the government refused to provide any support. The machine was dismantled and returned to his son some time after Fowler's death.

Though the machine did not survive to the present day, a replica has been constructed from a two-page description of it made in the 1840s by the prominent mathematician Augustus DeMorgan. Starting in 1999 a team of Mark Glusker, Pamela Vass and David Hogan created a concept model of the most simple machine that satisfies the description written by Augustus DeMorgan. The completed model was presented to the Great Torrington Museum in August 2000. This replica now resides at the Science Museum in London. The team are looking for funding to find more evidence about the machine's operation and appearance, and then to build the entire 55-digit machine that Fowler envisioned using techniques and materials more appropriate to the 19th century.

== Publications ==
1829. A Description of the Patent Thermosiphon.

1838. Tables for Facilitating Arithmetical Calculations in Poor Law Unions.

== Sources ==
- Fowler, Rev. Hugh (1875). "Biographical Notice of the Late Mr Thomas Fowler, of Torrington, with some account of his inventions". Transactions of the Devonshire Association. 7. Devonshire Association: 171–178.
- Glusker, Mark; Hogan, David M.; Vass, Pamela (July–September 2005). "The Ternary Calculating Machine of Thomas Fowler". IEEE Annals of the History of Computing. 27 (3): 4–22. doi:10.1109/MAHC.2005.49.
