= Charles Astley Fowler =

British general (1865–1940)

Major-General Charles Astley Fowler CB CSI DSO
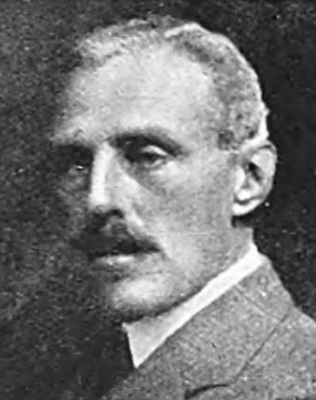
- Born: 9 November 1865 near Lahore, Punjab, British India
- Died: 7 January 1940 (aged 74); Wokingham, Berkshire, England
- Military career
- Allegiance: United Kingdom
- Branch: British Army
- Rank: Major-General
- Awards: CB CSI DSO

Major-General Charles Astley Fowler, CB, CSI, DSO (9 November 1865 – 7 January 1940) was an officer in the British Indian Army from 1886 to 1921, serving in both India and Europe. He commanded the 37th Brigade at the Battle of Loos in France in 1915 and was a Divisional Commander during the Third Afghan War in 1919.

== Early life ==
Charles Fowler was born near Lahore, Punjab, British India, the son of Deputy Surgeon-General Henry Day Fowler of the Indian Medical Service and Caroline Mary Oliver. Charles also had an older brother, Francis John Fowler, who also became a high-ranking Officer in the Indian Army. He was educated in England at Bedford Modern School, where he was in the first XV, and the Royal Military College, Sandhurst and was commissioned into the Devonshire Regiment as a lieutenant on 7 February 1885.

== Early military career ==
In 1886 Fowler transferred to the Indian Army and joined the 22nd Punjabis based at Moltan, and most of his active service was initially concentrated in the region of the North-West Frontier Province. He participated in the Miranzai Expedition of 1891, and was promoted to captain on 7 February 1896. Attached to the Punjab Command, he was on 23 August 1900 appointed a temporary staff officer as deputy assistant adjutant-general to the Kohat-Kurram Force, which included organizing the Kurram militia. He also fought against the Darwesh Khel Wazirs in 1902. In 1908 he served on the Mohmand expedition and fought at the engagement of Kharga, for which he was mentioned in despatches and awarded the DSO

He was promoted to captain in the Indian Army in 1896; major in 1903, lieutenant colonel in 1907 and colonel in January 1912, although this was antedated to November 1911.

== First World War ==
When war was declared in 1914, Fowler returned to England and was promoted to temporary brigadier-general on 24 August and placed in command of the 37th Infantry Brigade of the 12th (Eastern) Division part of Kitchener's Army two days later.

After training, the brigade was given its first experience of the Western Front at Ploegsteert Wood on the Ypres Salient in June 1915. On 1 October the 37th Brigade was deployed on the front line at the Battle of Loos. After days of heavy shelling the Germans launched their attack on the British lines on 8 October. The 37th held their sector of trench and managed to counter-attack which succeeded in gaining some German-held ground until a withdrawal was forced through a shortage of grenades

On 13 October at 2 p.m. the British launched their own attack. The original offensive on 24 September had been intended to force a decisive breach in the German lines, but despite some early success this had proved to have been beyond the British. The aims of the second offensive were scaled back to 'skirmishing for local advantages', as Robert Graves, a veteran of Loos, put it. Chief among these was the Hohenzollern Redoubt, a small but strategically vital hill in the otherwise pancake-flat countryside around Loos. The British had captured the redoubt on the 25 September, but it had been retaken by the Germans on 3 October. Fowler's Brigade was given the task of capturing Gun Trench, one in a network of subsidiary German trenches that spread from the redoubt. The British advance was undermined by an inadequate artillery bombardment which failed to clear a path for the Infantry, and also by the use of poison gas which achieved little more than to warn the Germans of the impending attack. The brigade's left flank, occupied by the 6th (Service) Battalion of the Buffs (East Kent Regiment), was caught in a hail of machine gun fire from an unshelled German position and 409 officers and men were killed within barely 100 yards of the British trenches. The rest of the brigade overcame enfilade fire to secure Gun Trench and managed to hold the position against a ferocious German counterattack over the following 24 hours, until they were finally reinforced and relieved.

Although the 37th Brigade had succeeded in their prescribed task this was considered to be only a minor consolation amidst greater failures. Overall the British regarded Loos as a disaster; 59,000 British casualties, no breakthrough had been achieved and the Hohenzollern Redoubt remained in German possession until very nearly the end of the war. Nevertheless, Fowler was mentioned in the despatches of Field Marshal Sir John French and was awarded the CB.

== Later career ==
French was replaced by Sir Douglas Haig as commander-in-chief of the BEF in December 1915, and perhaps partly because of this Fowler relinquished command of the 37th Brigade in January 1916. He saw no further active service on the Western Front. In 1916 and 1917 he held a special position in the Censor's Department. In 1918 he was promoted to major-general and at the end of the War he returned to India.

In May 1919 the Third Afghan War broke out as Afghanistan decided to exploit the very war-weary condition of the British by launching an invasion by 50,000 troops of British India. On 3 May the town of Bagh, situated on the British side of the Khyber Pass, was occupied by the Afghans and they fought off an immediate attempt to remove them. On 11 May Fowler, commanding the 1st and 2nd Brigades of the First Infantry Division of the Indian Army, led a second attempt to recapture Bagh. Utilising artillery and machine gun fire as well as deploying the Royal Air Force the British routed the Afghans and reoccupied the town. Fowler was subsequently awarded the CSI. He relinquished command of the Rangoon Brigade on 31 May 1920.

== Later life ==
On 25 July 1894, Fowler married Cicely Florence Mary Woodroffe at St. Thomas's Church in Calcutta. She was the elder daughter of James Tisdall Woodroffe, Advocate-General of Bengal, and sister of Sir John Woodroffe. They had a daughter in 1895, Doris Agnes, who died in childhood, and a son, Maurice Alban James, born 1901. However, the marriage was an unhappy one, and they eventually separated in 1917. He repeatedly asked for a divorce but she refused. However, she successfully sued him for divorce on grounds of adultery in 1925.

Shortly afterward, he married secondly, Ethel May O'Donoghue Prideaux, ex-wife of Harry Symes Prideaux. They settled at Wargrave in Berkshire where he died in June 1940.

Major-General Fowler retired from the Army in 1921.
