= Fowler Calculators =

Fowler "Magnum" calculator and handbook

Fowler Calculators Ltd was a manufacturer of slide rules and other scientific and mathematical instruments, based in Manchester, England and founded by William Henry Fowler (ca. 1854–1932).

== Life of William Henry Fowler ==
William Henry Fowler, born in Oldham, England, began his interest in engineering and manufacturing around age 14 when he began training in textiles and machinery at the Oldham firm of Platt Brothers. He then went on to study mathematics at Owens College in Manchester in the 1870s. Following his time at Owens College, he became an assistant engineer for the Manchester Steam Users' Association (ca. 1877–1888) and worked as the general manager at the Chadderton Iron Works Co.

Fowler became editor for the weekly journal The Practical Engineer in 1891, which led to him starting the Scientific Publishing Company in 1898. That year, The Mechanical Engineer—his weekly journal under the Scientific Publishing Company—published a design for a circular calculator operated by moving fixed pointers over a revolving dial. It is unknown whose design it was that was originally published in the journal. Fowler's son, Harold (1879-unknown), also graduated from Owen's College and worked as an electrical engineer before becoming an editor for The Mechanical Engineer alongside his father in 1905. Three years later—in 1908—Harold began commercial production of circular calculators in a spare room of the Fowler house in Sale which was converted into a shop. It is uncertain whether W. H. Fowler financed this original setup. Production included the same design with the calculator's appearance and control resembling that of a pocket watch.

W. H. Fowler became owner of Fowler & Co. and filed for several patents between the years of 1910 and 1924. Among these patents were the designs for the company's cornerstone "Pocket" calculators, which the company would continue to manufacture throughout its existence. W. H. Fowler died on April 4, 1932, and Harold took ownership of the company. Harold continued expanding production, aiming to be used in surveying work, construction, and textile manufacturing. In 1942, Jim Cookson became the new head manager and the company's name was changed to Fowler's (Calculators) Ltd.

Cookson became owner after Harold retired and would carry on production of Fowler's calculators until the company was liquidized following his own retirement in 1988.

== Types of Fowler Calculator ==
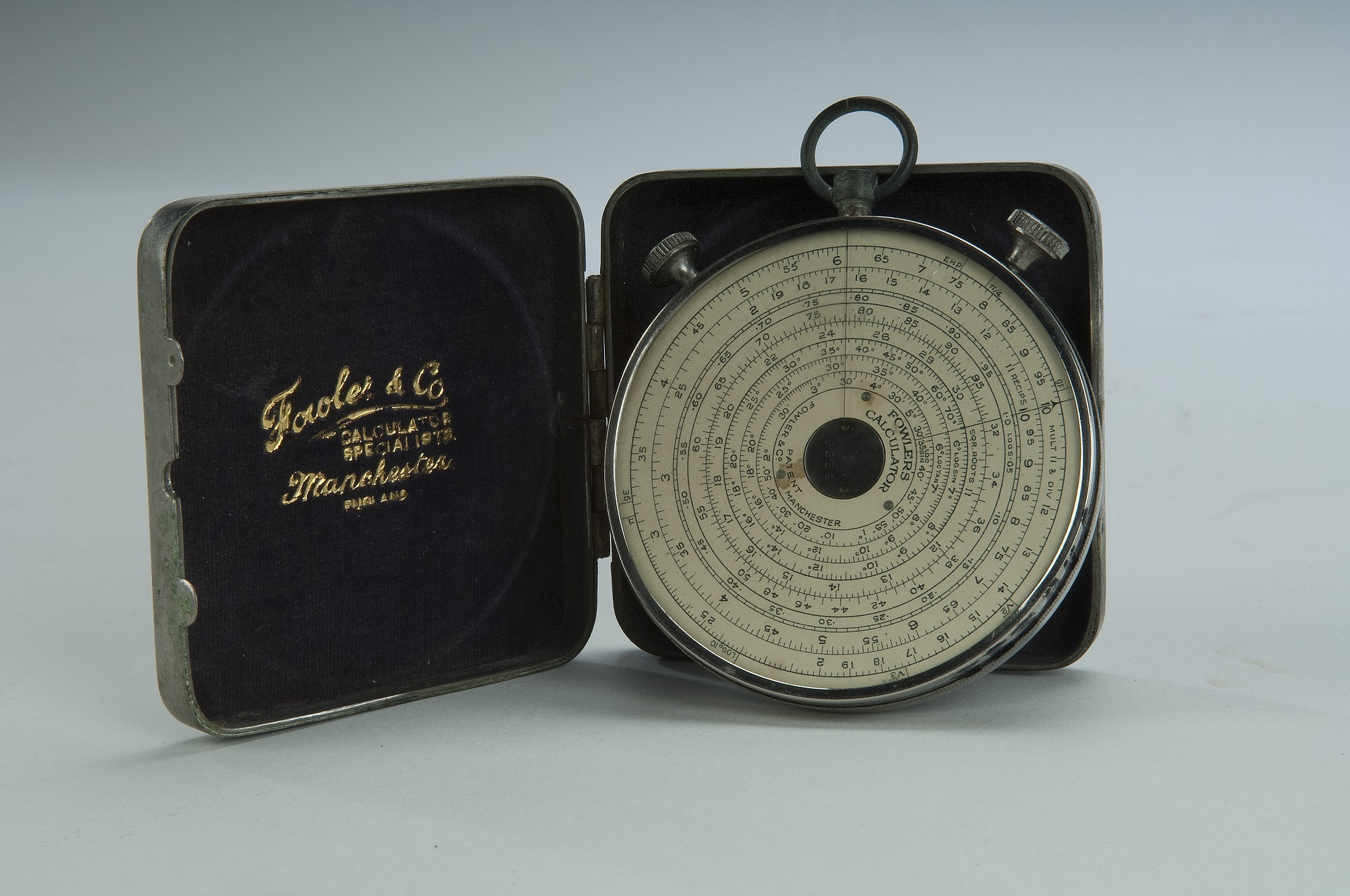
Harold Fowler's long scale calculator with case. One of the first Fowler calculators with two knobs.

=== Long Scale and "Magnum" Calculators ===
Following the patent and release of Harold's Long Scale calculator featuring two knobs on the outside rim in 1914, he designed the Magnum Long Scale calculator in 1927. As the name "Magnum" implies, it was a fairly large device at 4.5 inches in diameter—about 1.5 inches more than Fowler's average non-Magnum-series calculators. The large design meant that much larger calculations could be performed on it, "to four, and sometimes five, significant figures," according to the instruction manual. Another added benefit of the Magnum's size was its readability. The instruction manual claimed the calculator's size "permits of the use of larger figures and easier reading...Another important feature is that the scales are longer and admit finer graduation."
