= Arsonic acid (functional group) =

The general chemical structure of arsonic acids

Arsonic acids are a subset of organoarsenic compounds defined as oxyacids where a pentavalent arsenic atom is bonded to two hydroxyl groups, a third oxygen atom (this one with a double bond), and an organic substituent. The salts/conjugate bases of arsonic acids are called arsonates. Like all arsenic-containing compounds, arsonic acids are toxic and carcinogenic to humans.

Arsonic acid refers to H_{3}AsO_{3}, the case where the substituent is a single hydrogen atom. The other arsonic acids can simply be viewed as hydrocarbyl derivatives of this base case. Arsenic acid results when the substituent is a hydroxyl group. Methylarsonic acid results when the substituent is a methyl group. Phenylarsonic acid results when the substituent is a phenyl group.

== Syntheses ==
The Béchamp reaction is used to produce arsonic acids from activated aromatic substrates. The reaction is an electrophilic aromatic substitution, using arsenic acid as the electrophile. The reaction proceeds according to this idealized stoichiometry:

C_{6}H_{5}NH_{2} + H_{3}AsO_{4} → H_{2}O_{3}AsC_{6}H_{4}NH_{2} + H_{2}O

== Uses ==
=== Poultry feed ===
Chemical structure of nitarsone, an arsonic acid used as a feed additive

Arsanilic acid, carbarsone, nitarsone, and roxarsone were formerly used in poultry feed in order to promote growth and increase feed conversion. In addition, nitarsone and carbarsone can also prevent histomoniasis. However, concern grew over whether or not the arsenic would be ingested by humans when they ate the poultry. In 2013, a study found that chickens who were fed roxarsone and other arsenic-containing feed additives tended to show elevated levels of arsenic in breast meat—three times as high—compared to chickens that were not fed any arsenical feed additives. On September of that year, Zoetis and Fleming Laboratories, the drugs' sponsors, voluntarily withdrew the FDA approvals for arsanilic acid, carbarsone, and roxarsone, leaving only nitarsone approved until its approval for use in animal feed was withdrawn by the FDA in 2015.

=== Medicine ===
Difetarsone and carbarsone can be used to treat protozoal infections and Entamoeba histolytica infections. Difetarsone can also be used to treat whipworm infections. Arsanilic acid was discovered to treat sleeping sickness in the early 1900s, but its usage in humans was discontinued after it was found to be too toxic. Acetarsol is an anti-infective.

== List ==
Arsenic acid is technically not an arsonic acid because the substituent is a hydroxyl group, not a hydrocarbyl group, so arsenic acid has three hydroxyl groups bound to the arsenic atom, while arsonic acids only have two.

| Name | Picture | Substituent |
|---|---|---|
| Acetarsol | | ortho-acetamol |
| Arsanilic acid | | Aniline |
| Arsenic acid | | Hydroxyl group |
| Arsonic acid | | Hydrogen atom |
| Carbarsone | | Phenylurea |
| Difetarsone | | |
| Methylarsonic acid | | Methyl group |
| P-Azobenzenearsonate | | |
| Phenylarsonic acid | | Phenyl group |
| Nitarsone | | Nitrobenzene |
| Roxarsone | | o-Nitrophenol |
| Thorin | | 3-hydroxy-4-phenyldiazenylnaphthalene-2,7-disulfonic acid |
