= Arsenic biochemistry =

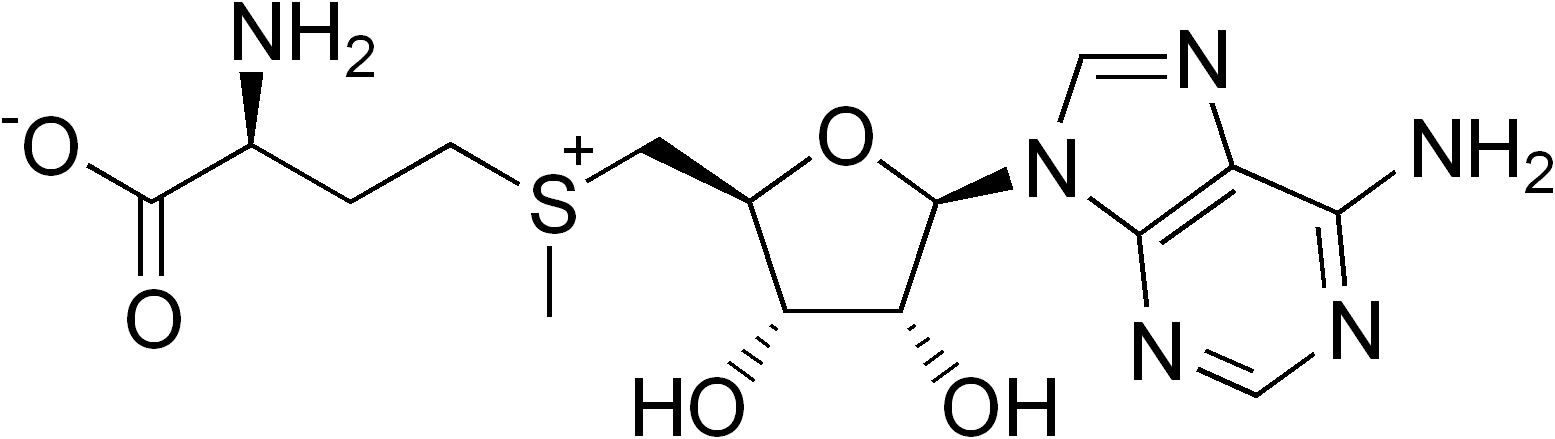
S-Adenosylmethionine, a source of methyl groups in many biogenic arsenic compounds

Arsenic biochemistry is the set of biochemical processes that can use arsenic or its compounds, such as arsenate. Arsenic is a moderately abundant element in Earth's crust, and although many arsenic compounds are often considered highly toxic to most life, a wide variety of organoarsenic compounds are produced biologically and various organic and inorganic arsenic compounds are metabolized by numerous organisms. This pattern is general for other related elements, including selenium, which can exhibit both beneficial and deleterious effects. Arsenic biochemistry has become topical since many toxic arsenic compounds are found in some aquifers, potentially affecting many millions of people via biochemical processes.

== Sources of arsenic ==
=== Organoarsenic compounds in nature ===
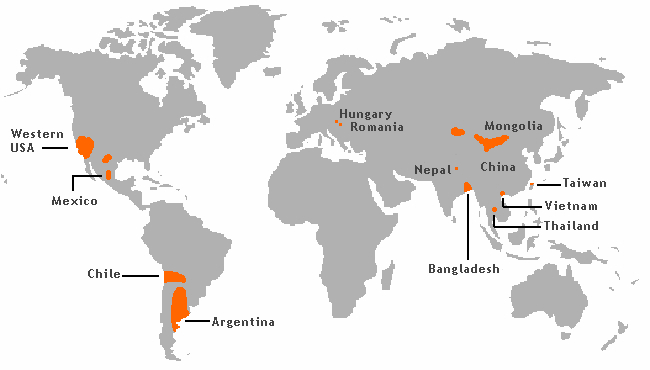
Arsenic poisoning is a global problem arising from naturally occurring arsenic in ground water.

The evidence that arsenic may be a beneficial nutrient at trace levels below the background to which living organisms are normally exposed has been reviewed. Some organoarsenic compounds found in nature are arsenobetaine and arsenocholine, both being found in many marine organisms. Some As-containing nucleosides (sugar derivatives) are also known. Several of these organoarsenic compounds arise via methylation processes. For example, the mold Scopulariopsis brevicaulis produces significant amounts of trimethylarsine if inorganic arsenic is present. The organic compound arsenobetaine is found in some marine foods such as fish and algae, and also in mushrooms in larger concentrations. In clean environments, the edible mushroom species Cyanoboletus pulverulentus hyperaccumulates arsenic compounds in concentrations reaching 1,300 mg/kg (dry weight). A very unusual set of organoarsenic compounds was found in deer truffles (Elaphomyces spp.). The average person's intake is about 10–50 μg/day. Values about 1000 μg are not unusual following consumption of fish or mushrooms; however, there is little danger in eating fish since this arsenic compound is nearly non-toxic.

Representative organoarsenic compounds found in nature.

Arsenobetaine, one of the most common arsenic compound in nature. Also common is arsenocholine, which has CH_{2}OH in place of CO_{2}H).

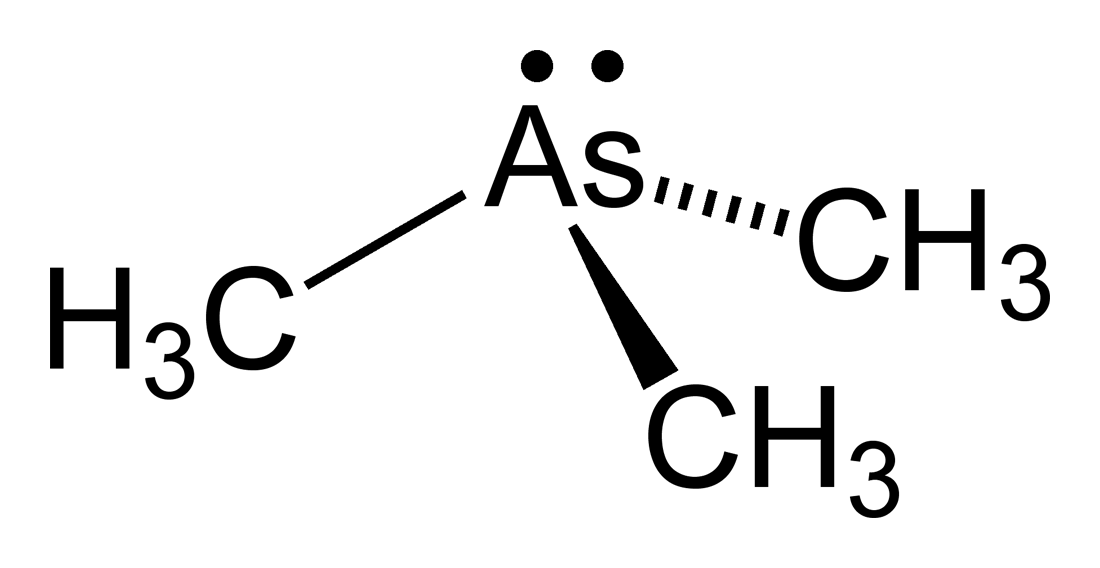
Trimethylarsine, produced by microbial action on arsenate-derived pigments

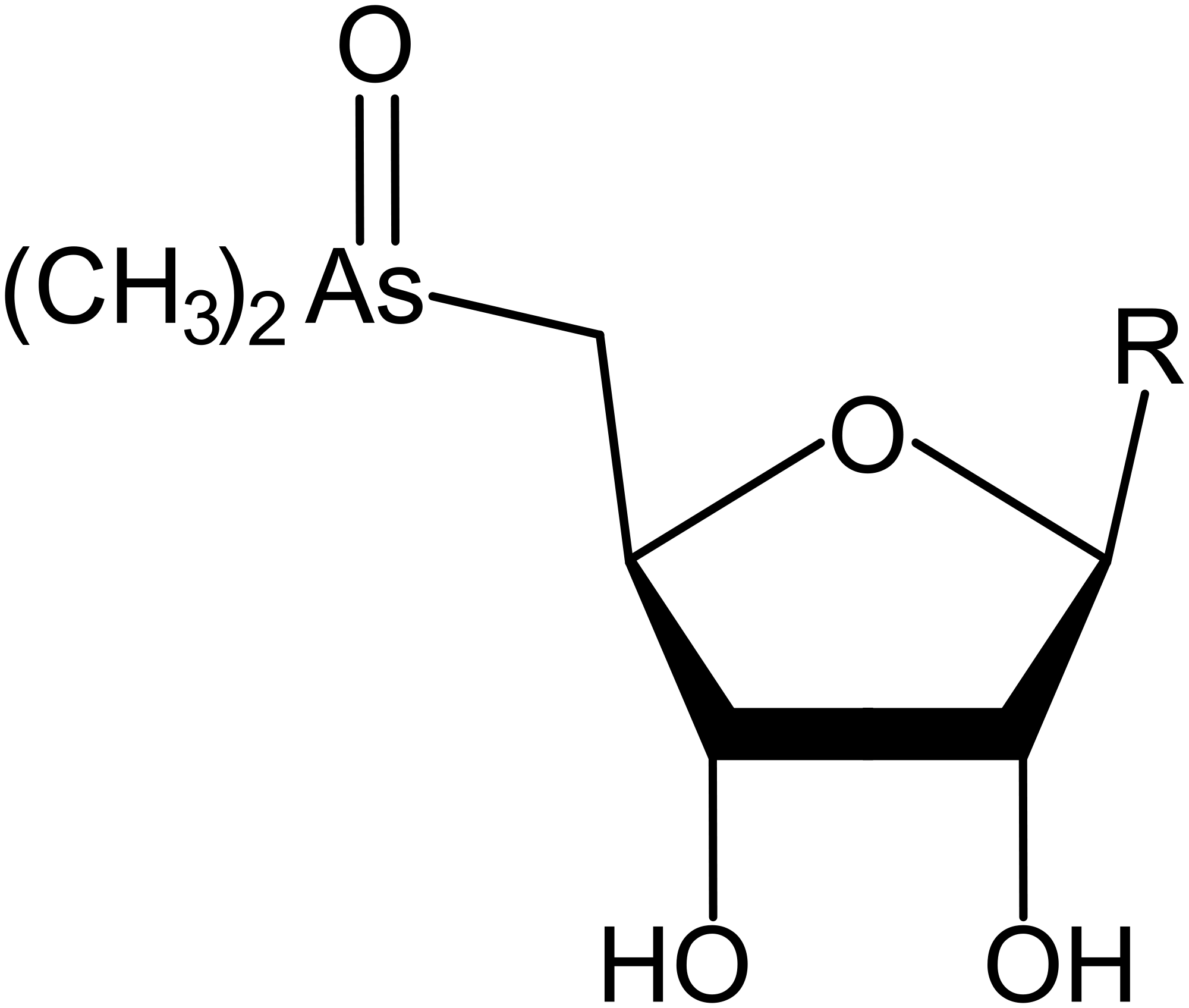
Arsenic-containing ribose derivatives (R = several groups)

A topical source of arsenic are the green pigments once popular in wallpapers, e.g. Paris green. A variety of illness have been blamed on this compound, although toxicity has been exaggerated.

Trimethylarsine, once known as Gosio's gas, is an intensely malodorous organoarsenic compound that is produced by microbial action on inorganic arsenic minerals.

Arsenic(V) compounds are easily reduced to arsenic(III) and could have served as an electron acceptor on the early Earth. Lakes that contain a substantial amount of dissolved inorganic arsenic, harbor arsenic-tolerant biota.

=== Incorrect claims of arsenic incorporation into DNA and RNA ===
Although phosphate and arsenate are structurally similar, there is no evidence that arsenic can be incorporated into DNA or RNA. In 2010, Felisa Wolfe-Simon published a paper claiming that the bacterium GFAJ-1 could incorporate arsenic into its DNA; other researchers vigorously refuted this claim, leading Science to retract the paper in 2025.

=== Anthropogenic arsenic compounds ===
Anthropogenic (man-made) sources of arsenic, like the natural sources, are mainly arsenic oxides and the associated anions. Man-made sources of arsenic, include wastes from mineral processing, swine and poultry farms. For example, many ores, especially sulfide minerals, are contaminated with arsenic, which is released in roasting (burning in air). In such processing, arsenide is converted to arsenic trioxide, which is volatile at high temperatures and is released into the atmosphere. Poultry and swine farms make heavy use of the organoarsenic compound roxarsone as an antibiotic in feed. Some wood is treated with copper arsenates as a preservative. The mechanisms by which these sources affect "downstream" living organisms remains uncertain but are probably diverse. One commonly cited pathway involves methylation.

The monomethylated acid, methanearsonic acid (CH_{3}AsO(OH)_{2}), is a precursor to fungicides (tradename Neoasozin) in the cultivation of rice and cotton. Derivatives of phenylarsonic acid (C_{6}H_{5}AsO(OH)_{2}) are used as feed additives for livestock, including 4-hydroxy-3-nitrobenzenearsonic acid (3-NHPAA or Roxarsone), ureidophenylarsonic acid, and p-arsanilic acid. These applications are controversial as they introduce soluble forms of arsenic into the environment.

==== Arsenic-based drugs ====
Despite, or possibly because of, its long-known toxicity, arsenic-containing potions and drugs have a history in medicine and quackery that continues into the 21st century. Starting in the early 19th century and continuing into the 20th century, Fowler's solution, a toxic concoction of sodium arsenite, was sold. The organoarsenic compound Salvarsan was the first synthetic chemotherapeutic agent, discovered by Paul Ehrlich. The treatment, however, led to many problems causing long lasting health complications. Around 1943 it was finally superseded by penicillin. The related drug Melarsoprol is still in use against late-state African trypanosomiasis (sleeping sickness), despite the substance's possibly fatal side effects.

Arsenic trioxide (As_{2}O_{3}) inhibits cell growth and induces apoptosis (programmed cell death) in certain types of cancer cells, which are normally immortal and can multiply without limit. Arsenic trioxide-induced necrosis has been shown to provoke immune activation through release of damage-associated molecular patterns (DAMPs). In combination with all-trans retinoic acid, it is FDA-approved as first-line treatment for promyelocytic leukemia.

== Methylation of arsenic ==
Inorganic arsenic and its compounds, upon entering the food chain, are progressively metabolised (detoxified) through a process of methylation. The methylation occurs through alternating reductive and oxidative methylation reactions, that is, reduction of pentavalent to trivalent arsenic followed by addition of a methyl group (CH_{3}).

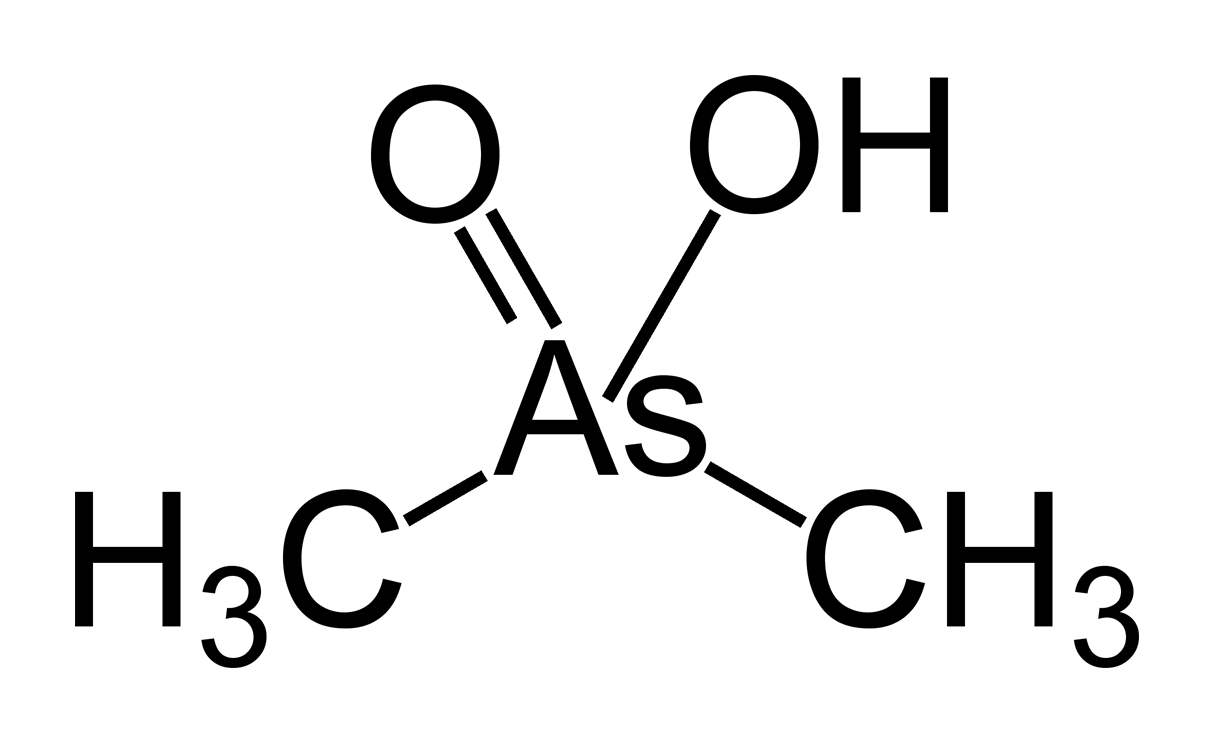
Cacodylic acid, formed in the liver after ingestion of arsenic.

In mammals, methylation occurs in the liver by methyltransferases, the products being the dimethylarsinous acid ((CH_{3})_{2}AsOH) and dimethylarsinic acid ((CH_{3})_{2}As(O)OH), which have the oxidation states As(III) and As(V), respectively. Although the mechanism of methylation of arsenic in humans has not been elucidated, the source of methyl is methionine, which suggests a role of S-adenosyl methionine. Exposure to toxic doses begin when the liver's methylation capacity is exceeded or inhibited.

There are two major forms of arsenic that can enter the body, arsenic (III) and arsenic (V). Arsenic (III) enters the cells though aquaporins 7 and 9, which is a type of aquaglyceroporin. Arsenic (V) compounds use phosphate transporters to enter cells. The arsenic (V) can be converted to arsenic (III) by the enzyme purine nucleoside phosphorylase. This is classified as a bioactivation step, as although arsenic (III) is more toxic, it is more readily methylated.

There are two routes by which inorganic arsenic compounds are methylated. The first route uses Cyt19 arsenic methyltransferase to methylate arsenic (III) to a mono-methylated arsenic (V) compound. This compound is then converted to a mono-methylated arsenic (III) compound using Glutathione S-Transferase Omega-1 (GSTO1). The mono-methylated arsenic (V) compound can then be methylated again by Cyt19 arsenic methyltransferase, which forms a dimethyl arsenic (V) compound, which can be converted to a dimethyl arsenic (III) compound by Glutathione S-Transferase Omega-1 (GTSO1). The other route uses glutathione (GSH) to conjugate with arsenic (III) to form an arsenic (GS) _{3} complex. This complex can form a monomethylated arsenic (III) GS complex, using Cyt19 arsenic methyltransferase, and this monomethylated GS complex is in equilibrium with the monomethylated arsenic (III). Cyt19 arsenic methyltransferase can methylate the complex one more time, and this forms a dimethylated arsenic GS complex, which is in equilibrium with a dimethyl arsenic (III) complex. Both of the mono-methylated and di-methylated arsenic compounds can readily be excreted in urine. However, the monomethylated compound was shown to be more reactive and more toxic than the inorganic arsenic compounds to human hepatocytes (liver), keratinocytes in the skin, and bronchial epithelial cells (lungs).

Studies in experimental animals and humans show that both inorganic arsenic and methylated metabolites cross the placenta to the fetus, however, there is evidence that methylation is increased during pregnancy and that it could be highly protective for the developing organism.

Enzymatic methylation of arsenic is a detoxification process; it can be methylated to methylarsenite, dimethylarsenite or trimethylarsenite, all of which are trivalent. The methylation is catalyzed by arsenic methyltransferase (AS3MT) in mammals, which transfers a methyl group on the cofactor S-adenomethionine (SAM) to arsenic (III). An orthologue of AS3MT is found in bacteria and is called CmArsM. This enzyme was tested in three states (ligand free, arsenic (III) bound and SAM bound). Arsenic (III) binding sites usually use thiol groups of cysteine residues. The catalysis involves thiolates of Cys72, Cys174, and Cys224. In an SN2 reaction, the positive charge on the SAM sulfur atom pulls the bonding electron from the carbon of the methyl group, which interacts with the arsenic lone pair to form an As−C bond, leaving SAH.

=== Excretion ===
In humans, the major route of excretion of most arsenic compounds is via the urine. The biological half-life of inorganic arsenic is about 4 days, but is slightly shorter following exposure to arsenate than to arsenite. The main metabolites excreted in the urine of humans exposed to inorganic arsenic are mono- and dimethylated arsenic acids, together with some unmetabolized inorganic arsenic.

The biotransformation of arsenic for excretion is primarily done through the nuclear factor erythroid 2 related factor 2 (Nrf2) pathway. Under normal conditions the Nrf2 is bound to Kelch-like ECH associated protein 1 (Keap1) in its inactive form. With the uptake of arsenic within cells and the subsequent reactions that result in the production of reactive oxygen species (ROS), the Nrf2 unbinds and becomes active. Keap1 has reactive thiol moieties that bind ROS or electrophilic arsenic species such as monomethylted arsenic (III) and induces the release of Nrf2 which then travels through the cytoplasm to the nucleus. The Nrf2 then activates antioxidant responsive element (ARE) as well as electrophilic responsive element (EpRE) both of which contribute in the increase of antioxidant proteins. Of particular note in these antioxidant proteins is heme oxygenase 1 (HO-1), NAD(P)H-quinone oxidoreductase 1 (NQO1), and γ-glutamylcysteine synthase (γGCS) which work in conjunction to reduce the oxidative species such as hydrogen peroxide to decrease the oxidative stress upon the cell. The increase in γGCS causes an increased production of arsenite triglutathionine (As(SG)_{3}) an important adduct that is taken up by either multidrug associated protein 1 (MRP1) or MRP2 which remove the arsenic out of the cell and into bile for excretion. This adduct can also decompose back into inorganic arsenic.

Of particular note in the excretion of arsenic is the multiple methylation steps that take place which may increase the toxicity of arsenic due to MMeAsIII being a potent inhibitor of glutathione peroxidase, glutathione reductase, pyruvate dehydrogenase, and thioredoxin reductase.

== Arsenic toxicity ==
Arsenic is a cause of mortality throughout the world; associated problems include heart, respiratory, gastrointestinal, liver, nervous and kidney diseases.

Arsenic interferes with cellular longevity by allosteric inhibition of an essential metabolic enzyme pyruvate dehydrogenase (PDH) complex, which catalyzes the oxidation of pyruvate to acetyl-CoA by NAD^{+}. With the enzyme inhibited, the energy system of the cell is disrupted resulting in a cellular apoptosis episode. Biochemically, arsenic prevents use of thiamine resulting in a clinical picture resembling thiamine deficiency. Poisoning with arsenic can raise lactate levels and lead to lactic acidosis.

Genotoxicity involves inhibition of DNA repair and DNA methylation. The carcinogenic effect of arsenic arises from the oxidative stress induced by arsenic. Arsenic's high toxicity naturally led to the development of a variety of arsenic compounds as chemical weapons, e.g. dimethylarsenic chloride. Some were employed as chemical warfare agents, especially in World War I. This threat led to many studies on antidotes and an expanded knowledge of the interaction of arsenic compounds with living organisms. One result was the development of antidotes such as British anti-Lewisite. Many such antidotes exploit the affinity of As(III) for thiolate ligands, which convert highly toxic organoarsenicals to less toxic derivatives. It is generally assumed that arsenates bind to cysteine residues in proteins.

By contrast, arsenic oxide is an approved and effective chemotherapeutic drug for the treatment of acute promyelocytic leukemia (APL).

=== Toxicity of pentavalent arsenicals ===
Due to its similar structure and properties, pentavalent arsenic metabolites are capable of replacing the phosphate group of many metabolic pathways. The replacement of phosphate by arsenate is initiated when arsenate reacts with glucose and gluconate in vitro. This reaction generates glucose-6-arsenate and 6-arsenogluconate, which act as analogs for glucose-6-phosphate and 6-phosphogluconate. At the substrate level, during glycolysis, glucose-6-arsenate binds as a substrate to glucose-6-phosphate dehydrogenase, and also inhibits hexokinase through negative feedback. Unlike the importance of phosphate in glycolysis, the presence of arsenate restricts the generation of ATP by forming an unstable anhydride product, through the reaction with D-glyceraldehyde-3-phosphate. The anhydride 1-arsenato-3-phospho-D-glycerate generated readily hydrolyzes due to the longer bond length of As-O compared to P-O. At the mitochondrial level, arsenate uncouples the synthesis of ATP by binding to ADP in the presence of succinate, thus forming an unstable compound that ultimately results in a decrease of ATP net gain. Arsenite (III) metabolites, on the other hand, have limited effect on ATP production in red blood cells.

=== Toxicity of trivalent arsenicals ===
Enzymes and receptors that contain thiol or sulfhydryl functional groups are actively targeted by arsenite (III) metabolites. These sulfur-containing compounds are normally glutathione and the amino acid cysteine. Arsenite derivatives generally have higher binding affinity compared to the arsenate metabolites. These bindings restrict activity of certain metabolic pathways. For example, pyruvate dehydrogenase (PDH) is inhibited when monomethylarsonous acid (MMA^{III}) targets the thiol group of the lipoic acid cofactor. PDH is a precursor of acetyl-CoA, thus the inhibition of PDH eventually limits the production of ATP in electron transport chain, as well as the production of gluconeogenesis intermediates.

=== Oxidative stress ===
Arsenic can cause oxidative stress through the formation of reactive oxygen species (ROS), and reactive nitrogen species (RNS). Reactive oxygen species are produced by the enzyme NADPH oxidase, which transfers electrons from NADPH to oxygen, synthesizing a superoxide, which is a reactive free radical. This superoxide can react to form hydrogen peroxide and a reactive oxygen species. The enzyme NADPH oxidase is able to generate more reactive oxygen species in the presence of arsenic, due to the subunit p22phox, which is responsible for the electron transfer, being upregulated by arsenic. The reactive oxygen species are capable of stressing the endoplasmic reticulum, which increases the amount of the unfolded protein response signals. This leads to inflammation, cell proliferation, and eventually to cell death. Another mechanism in which reactive oxygen species cause cell death would be through the cytoskeleton rearrangement, which affects the contractile proteins.

The reactive nitrogen species arise once the reactive oxygen species destroy the mitochondria. This leads to the formation of the reactive nitrogen species, which are responsible for damaging DNA in arsenic poisoning. Mitochondrial damage is known to cause the release of reactive nitrogen species, due to the reaction between superoxides and nitric oxide (NO). Nitric oxide (NO) is a part of cell regulation, including cellular metabolism, growth, division and death. Nitric oxide (NO) reacts with reactive oxygen species to form peroxynitrite. In cases of chronic arsenic exposure, the nitric oxide levels are depleted, due to the superoxide reactions. The enzyme NO synthase (NOS) uses L-arginine to form nitric oxide, but this enzyme is inhibited by monomethylated arsenic (III) compounds.

=== DNA damage ===
Arsenic is reported to cause DNA modifications such as aneuploidy, micronuclei formation, chromosome abnormality, deletion mutations, sister chromatid exchange and crosslinking of DNA with proteins. It has been demonstrated that arsenic does not directly interact with DNA and it is considered a poor mutagen, but instead, it helps mutagenicity of other carcinogens. For instance, a synergistic increase in the mutagenic activity of arsenic with UV light has been observed in human and other mammalian cells after exposing the UV-treated cells to arsenic. A series of experimental observations suggest that the arsenic genotoxicity is primarily linked to the generation of reactive oxygen species (ROS) during its biotransformation. The ROS production is able to generate DNA adducts, DNA strand breaks, crosslinks and chromosomal aberrations. The oxidative damage is caused by modification of DNA nucleobases, in particular 8-oxoguanine (8-OHdG) which leads to G:C to T:A mutations. Inorganic arsenic can also cause DNA strand break even at low concentrations.

==== Inhibition of DNA repair ====
Inhibition of DNA repair processes is considered one of main mechanism of inorganic arsenic genotoxicity. Nucleotide excision repair (NER) and base excision repair (BER) are the processes implicated in the repair of DNA base damage induced by ROS after arsenic exposure. In particular, the NER mechanism is the major pathway for repairing bulky distortions in DNA double helix, while the BER mechanism is mainly implicated in the repair of single strand breaks induced by ROS, but inorganic arsenic could also repress the BER mechanism.

Exposure of isolated lymphocytes to arsenic causes decreased expression of the DNA repair protein ERCC1. Consistent with an inhibitory effect on DNA repair, lymphocytes from arsenic exposed individuals have higher levels of DNA damage. Arsenic can act as a co-carcinogen by inhibiting repair of DNA damage through its interaction with sensitive zinc finger DNA repair proteins.

=== Neurodegenerative mechanisms ===
Arsenic is highly detrimental to the innate and the adaptive immune system of the body. When the amount of unfolded and misfolded proteins in endoplasmic reticulum stress is excessive, the unfolded protein response (UPR) is activated to increase the activity of several receptors that are responsible the restoration of homeostasis. The inositol-requiring enzyme-1 (IRE1) and protein kinase RNA-like endoplasmic reticulum kinase (PERK) are two receptors that restrict the rate of translation. On the other hand, the unfolded proteins are corrected by the production of chaperones, which are induced by the activating transcription factor 6 (ATF6). If the number of erroneous proteins elevates, further mechanism is active which triggers apoptosis. Arsenic has evidentially shown to increase the activity of these protein sensors.

=== Immune dysfunction ===
Arsenic exposure in small children distorts the ratio of T helper cells (CD4) to cytotoxic T cells (CD8), which are responsible for immunodepression. In addition, arsenic also increases the number of inflammatory molecules being secreted through macrophages. The excess amount of granulocytes and monocytes lead to a chronic state of inflammation, which might result in cancer development.

== Arsenic poisoning treatment ==
There are three molecules that serve as chelator agents that bond to arsenic. These three are British Anti-Lewisite (BAL; dimercaprol), succimer (dimercaptosuccinic acid; DMSA) and Unithiol (2,3-dimercapto-1-propanesulfonic acid; DMPS).

When these agents chelate inorganic arsenic, it is converted into an organic form of arsenic because it is bound to the organic chelating agent. The sulfur atoms of the thiol groups are the site of interaction with arsenic. This is because the thiol groups are nucleophilic while the arsenic atoms are electrophilic. Once bound to the chelating agent the molecules can be excreted, and therefore free inorganic arsenic atoms are removed from the body.

Other chelating agents can be used, but may cause more side effects than British Anti-Lewisite (BAL, Dimercaprol), succimer (DMSA) and (DMPS). DMPS and DMSA also have a higher therapeutic index than BAL.

These drugs are efficient for acute poisoning of arsenic, which refers to the instantaneous effects caused by arsenic poisoning. For example, headaches, vomiting or sweating are some of the common examples of an instantaneous effect. In comparison, chronic poisonous effects arise later on, and unexpectedly such as organ damage. Usually it is too late to prevent them once they appear. Therefore, action should be taken as soon as acute poisonous effects arise.

== See also ==
- Arsenic compounds
- Extremophile
- Geomicrobiology
- Hypothetical types of biochemistry
- Organoarsenic chemistry
