= Colin Raston =

Australian academic (born 1950)

Colin Llewellyn Raston AO
- Born: 1950 (age 75–76)
- Education: BSc(Hons), PhD, DSc
- Alma mater: University of Western Australia; Griffith University
- Occupation: academic
- Known for: green, macrocyclic, and organometallic chemistry
- Title: Professor of Chemistry, Griffith University (1988–1994); Professor of Chemistry, Monash University (1995–2000); Professor of Chemistry, The University of Leeds (2001–2002); Professor of Chemistry, The University of Western Australia (2003–2012); Professor of Clean Technology, Flinders University (2013– )
- Awards: Burrows Award, 1994; H G Smith Memorial Medal, 1996; Green Chemistry Challenge Award, 2002; Leighton Memorial Medal, 2006; RACI Living Luminary, 2011; South Australia Premier's Professorial Research Fellow in Clean Technology, 2013; Ig Nobel Prize in Chemistry, 2015; Officer of the Order of Australia, 2016

Colin Llewellyn Raston AO FAA (born 1950) is a Professor of Chemistry of Flinders University in Adelaide, South Australia and the Premier's Professorial Fellow in Clean Technology. In 2015, he was awarded an Ig Nobel Prize in "for inventing a chemical recipe to partially un-boil an egg". In 2016, Raston was made an Officer of the Order of Australia for his services to science.

== Research work ==
=== Early career ===
Chemical structure of arsenobetaine

Raston undertook his early tertiary studies at the University of Western Australia, taking a bachelor degree in science with honours and a doctor of philosophy under Professor Allan White. Raston's work included looking at marine organoarsenic compounds, isolating arsenobetaine from the Western Rock Lobster and determining its structure and synthesis. This zwitterionic substance turns out to be the main source of arsenic in fish and unlike other arsenic compounds (like dimethylarsine and trimethylarsine) it has comparatively low toxicity. Arsenobetaine is an analog of betaine (trimethylglycine) and with similar biosynthesis to choline and betaines.

He later received a higher doctorate (Doctor of Science) from Griffith University.

=== Calixarenes ===
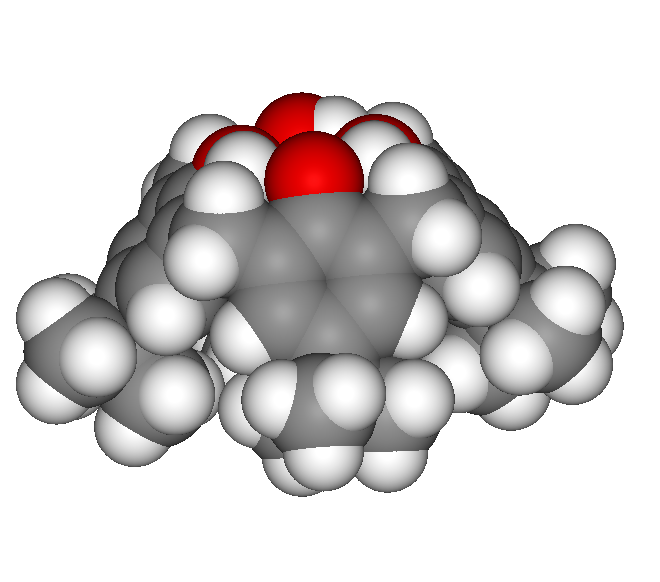
Calix[4]arene with para-tert-butyl substituents and a hydrophobic cavity formed by the phenyl groups. Hydrogen bonding between the hydroxyl groups stabilises the 'base' of the chalice.

Resorcinarene is a macrocycle typically prepared by the condensation of resorcinol and formaldehyde in an acidic environment. Multiple isomers are possible when any other aldehyde is used and different conditions, including Lewis acid catalysis have been employed to minimise by-products. Raston and co-workers have developed an alternative green chemistry solvent-free approach whereby resorcinol and the aldehyde are ground together with p-toluenesulfonic acid in a mortar and pestle and the product recrystallised from the resulting paste.

Calixarenes are the general category of macrocycle oligomers formed by hydroxyalkylation of a phenol and an aldehyde; Resorcinarenes are one example. Calixarenes resemble chalices (calix in Latin) with hydrophobic cavities that can hold smaller molecules or ions, an example of host–guest chemistry. Raston has demonstrated a green chemistry approach to pyrogallol[4]arene from isovaleraldehyde (3-methylbutanal) and pyrogallol (1,2,3-benzenetriol) with a catalytic amount of p-toluenesulfonic acid. He also produced a ball-and-socket supramolecular complex where calix[5]arene hosts the C_{70} fullerene. The five phenyl groups forming the walls of the cavity interact with the aromatic fullerene through π stacking.

=== Unboiling an egg ===
Ovalbumin is the protein which makes up around two-thirds of the white of an egg. When an egg is cooked, the ovalbumin changes conformation from its folded and soluble form to an insoluble all-β-sheet structure with exposed hydrophobic regions, leading to aggregation. This is a classic example of protein denaturation, defined as the loss of the quaternary, tertiary and secondary structures that are present in the protein's native state, by application of some external chemical or radiative stress (including heat). In order to "unboil" the egg, the individual protein strands must be separated from the aggregate and then re-folded back to their native form. Raston had the idea of using mechanical energy from spinning the aggregate to achieve this and developed vortex fluidic technology to implement his idea. Using it to unboil an egg (at least in part) was meant as a demonstration of the technology and won Raston and colleagues the 2015 Ig Nobel Prize in chemistry. Applications of the technology include boosting the potency of anti-cancer drugs like carboplatin and improving the production of biodiesel.

== Honours and awards ==
Raston was recognised for his professional achievements with Fellowships in the Royal Australian Chemical Institute (RACI) and the Royal Society of Chemistry. On 13 June 2016, Governor-General, Sir Peter Cosgrove announced that Raston had been made an Officer of the Order of Australia in the Queen's Birthday Honours List, for "distinguished service to science through seminal contributions to the field of chemistry as a researcher and academic, and to professional associations".

Raston served as the Vice President of the RACI in 1995–96, winning the H. G. Smith Memorial Medal that year, and went on to serve as President the following year. He has received several RACI awards, including the Burrows Award in 1994, which is the premier award of the Inorganic Chemistry Division of the RACI. In 2002, he was recognised with the Green Chemistry Challenge Award and went on to take the Leighton Memorial Medal, the institute's most prestigious medal given in recognition of eminent services to chemistry in Australia, in 2006. He was named an RACI Living Luminary and in 2013 was appointed as the South Australia Premier's Professorial Research Fellow in Clean Technology. Raston is also the founding co-chair of the RACI Green and Sustainable Chemistry (GASC) National Group.

In 2018, Raston was elected Fellow of the Australian Academy of Science (FAA).
