= Bechamp reaction =

Chemical reaction

In organic synthesis the Béchamp reaction is used for producing arsonic acids from activated aromatic substrates. The reaction is an electrophilic aromatic substitution, using arsenic acid as the electrophile. The reaction proceeds according to this idealized stoichiometry for the preparation of arsanilic acid:

C_{6}H_{5}NH_{2} + H_{3}AsO_{4} → H_{2}O_{3}AsC_{6}H_{4}NH_{2} + H_{2}O

== Reaction scope ==
The reaction was first reported in 1863 by Antoine Béchamp. It is very analogous to the sulfonation of arenes.

The Béchamp reaction was employed in the Nobel Prize-winning work on organoarsenicals by Paul Erlich.

In one commercial application, the Béchamp reaction is reaction is used to produce roxarsone, which exhibits an anticoccidial action and promotes growth in animals.
