= Arsonic acid =

Names
- Preferred IUPAC name Arsonic acid

Identifiers
CAS Number	36465-76-6
3D model (JSmol)	Interactive image
ChEBI	CHEBI:29850
ChemSpider	140865
PubChem CID	5491620
UNII	BZ0G20838B
CompTox Dashboard (EPA)	DTXSID5058515
- InChI: InChI=1S/AsH2O3/c2-1(3)4/h(H2,2,3,4) Key: MJJNNUVOCYXPBG-UHFFFAOYSA-N
- SMILES: O[AsH](=O)O

Properties
Chemical formula	AsH_{3}O_{3}
Molar mass	125.943 g·mol^{−1}
Conjugate base	Hydrogen arsonate
- Except where otherwise noted, data are given for materials in their standard state (at 25 °C [77 °F], 100 kPa). Infobox references

Arsenous acid (As(OH)_{3}) is the stable tautomer of H_{3}AsO_{3}.

Phosphorous acid (also called phosphonic acid) exists as the pentavalent tautomer, in contrast to H_{3}AsO_{3}.

Arsonic acid is the simplest of the arsonic acids. It is a hypothetical compound, although the tautomeric arsenious acid (As(OH)_{3}) is well established. In contrast to the instability of HAsO(OH)_{2}, the phosphorus compound with analogous stoichiometry exists as the tetrahedral tautomer. Similarly, organic derivatives such as phenylarsonic acid are tetrahedral with pentavalent central atom.

There are similar acids that are the same except for having different pnictogens. The phosphorus equivalent is phosphonic acid.
