= Disodium methyl arsonate =

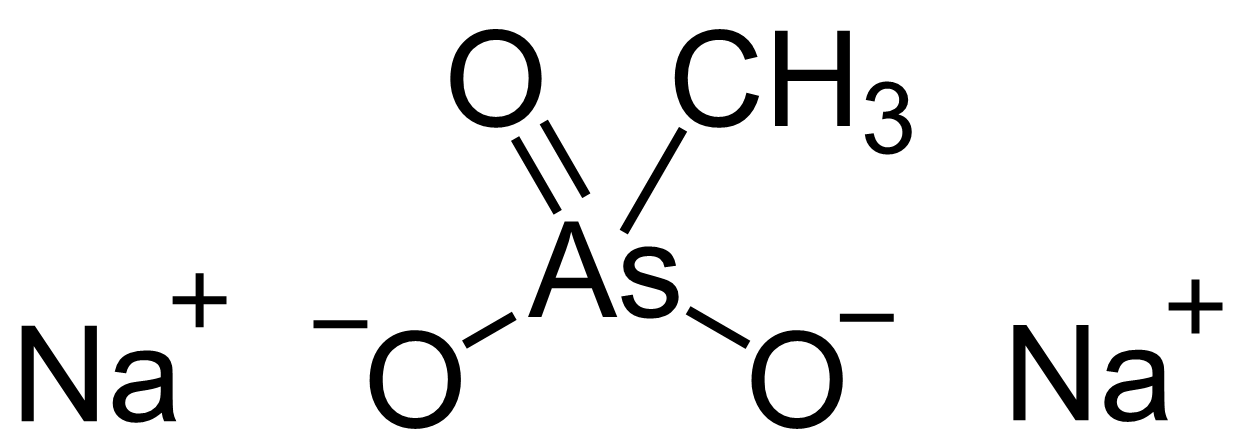

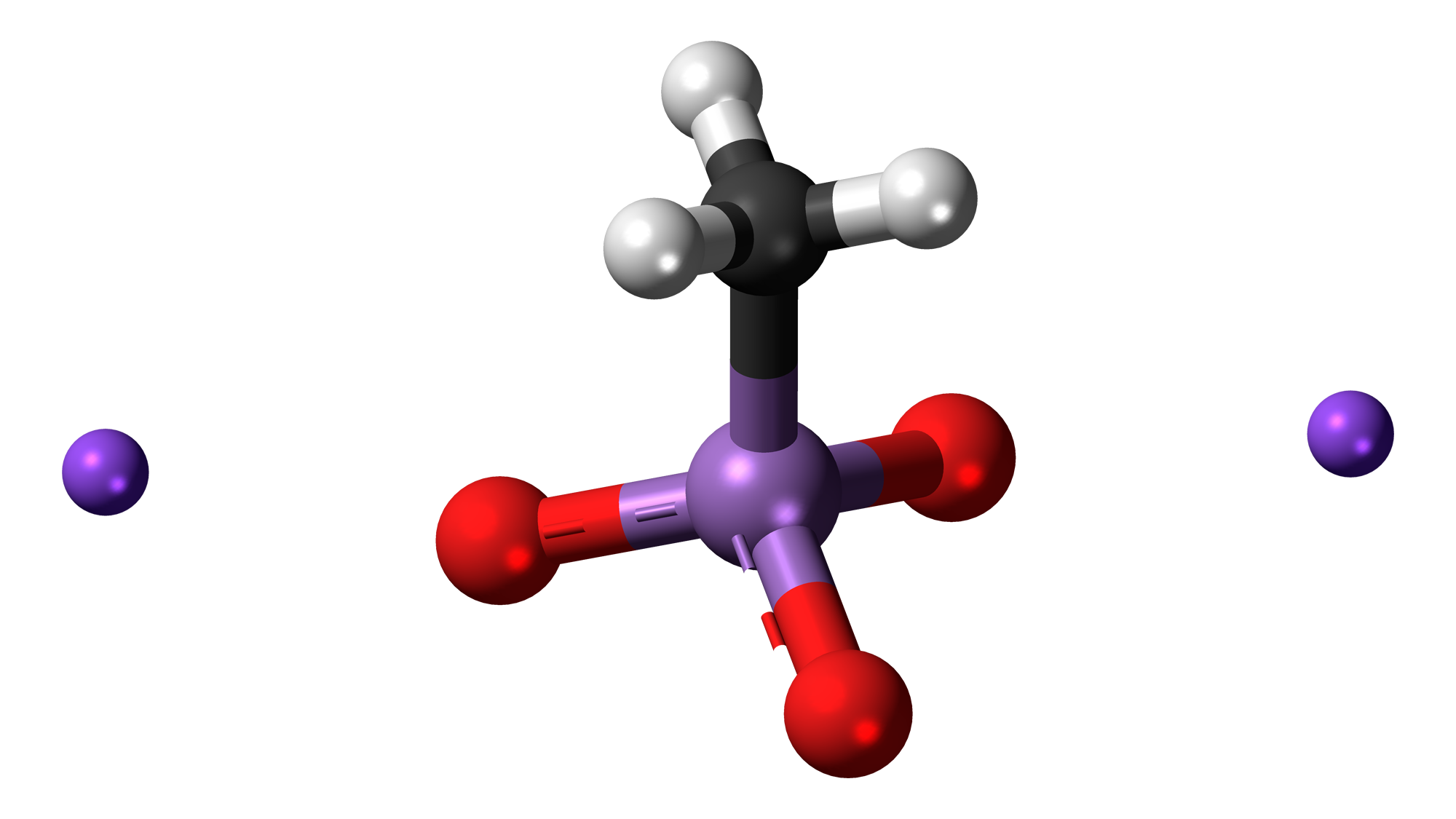

Names
- IUPAC name Disodium methyl-dioxido-oxoarsorane
- Other names Disodium methanearsonate; disodium methylarsonate

Identifiers
CAS Number	144-21-8
3D model (JSmol)	Interactive image
Abbreviations	DSMA
ChemSpider	8603
ECHA InfoCard	100.005.110
PubChem CID	8947
UNII	7NK4BV40VN
CompTox Dashboard (EPA)	DTXSID4032665
- InChI: InChI=1S/CH5AsO3.2Na/c1-2(3,4)5;;/h1H3,(H2,3,4,5);;/q;2*+1/p-2 Key: SDIXRDNYIMOKSG-UHFFFAOYSA-L; InChI=1/CH5AsO3.2Na/c1-2(3,4)5;;/h1H3,(H2,3,4,5);;/q;2*+1/p-2 Key: SDIXRDNYIMOKSG-NUQVWONBAA
- SMILES: C[As](=O)([O-])[O-].[Na+].[Na+]

Properties
Chemical formula	CH_{3}AsNa_{2}O_{3}
Molar mass	183.93 g/mol
- Except where otherwise noted, data are given for materials in their standard state (at 25 °C [77 °F], 100 kPa). verify (what is ?) Infobox references

Disodium methyl arsonate (DSMA) is the organoarsenic compound with the formula CH_{3}AsO_{3}Na_{2}. It is a colorless, water-soluble solid derived from methylarsonic acid. It was used as a herbicide. Tradenames include Metharsinat, Arrhenal, Disomear, Metharsan, Stenosine, Tonarsan, Tonarsin, Arsinyl, Arsynal, and Diarsen.

== Regulation ==
Use of most arsenic compounds in agriculture was voluntarily discontinued in the U.S.

== See also ==
- Cacodylic acid
- Monosodium methyl arsenate
