= Phenylarsonic acid =

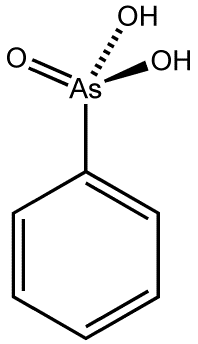
Stereo structural formula of phenylarsonic acid
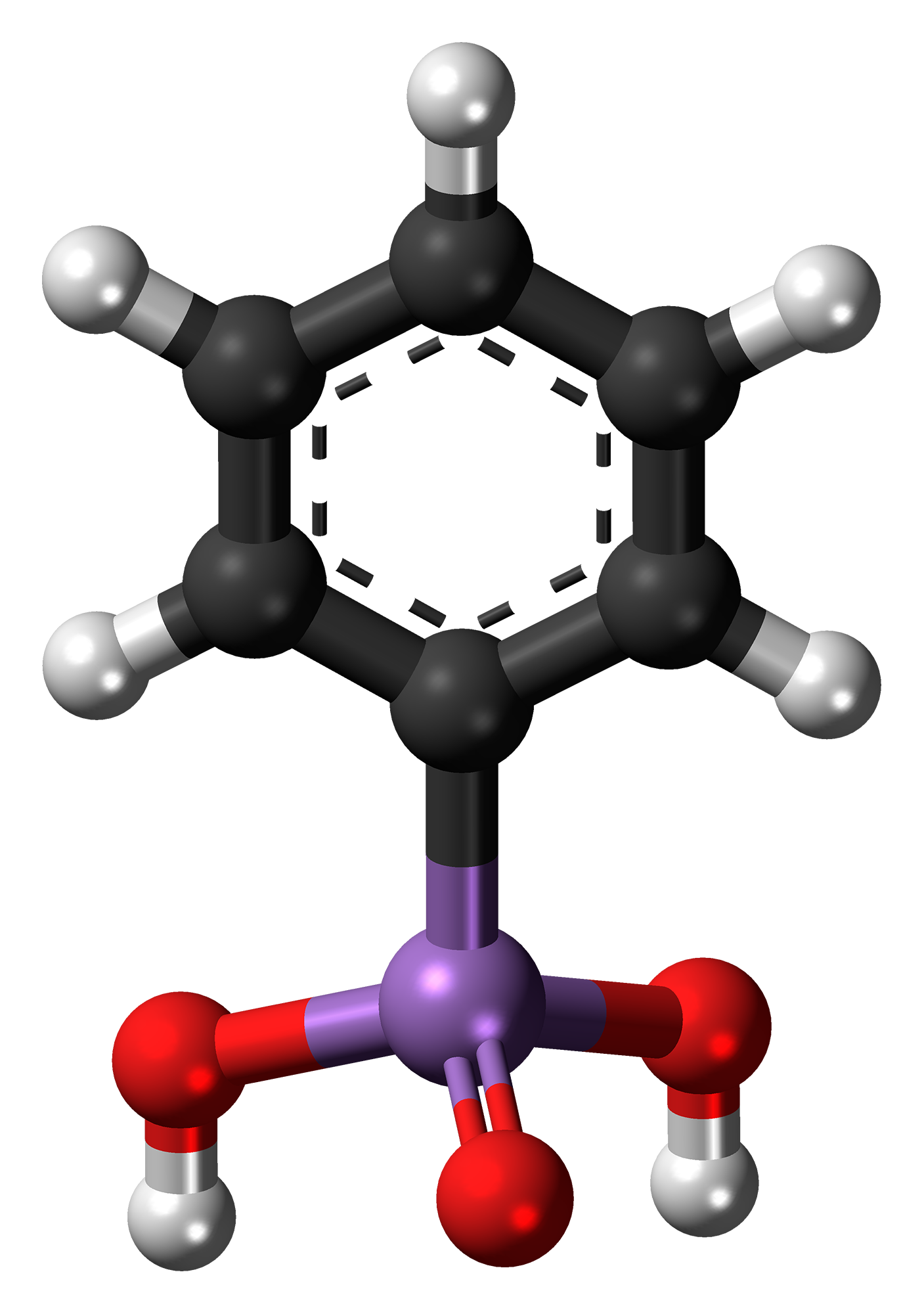

Names
- Preferred IUPAC name Phenylarsonic acid
- Other names Benzenearsonic acid

Identifiers
| CAS Number | 98-05-5 |
| 3D model (JSmol) | Interactive image |
| Abbreviations | PAA |
| Beilstein Reference | 2935741 |
| ChEBI | CHEBI:29851 |
| ChEMBL | ChEMBL364571 |
| ChemSpider | 7087 |
| ECHA InfoCard | 100.002.393 |
| EC Number | 202-631-9 |
| Gmelin Reference | 131185 |
| MeSH | Benzenearsonic+acid |
| PubChem CID | 7365 |
| RTECS number | CY3150000 |
| UNII | 57F9KU116M |
| UN number | 1557 |
| CompTox Dashboard (EPA) | DTXSID6059158 |
- InChI: InChI=1S/C6H7AsO3/c8-7(9,10)6-4-2-1-3-5-6/h1-5H,(H2,8,9,10) Key: LVKZSFMYNWRPJX-UHFFFAOYSA-N
- SMILES: O[As](O)(=O)C1=CC=CC=C1

Properties
| Chemical formula | C_{6}H_{7}AsO_{3} |
| Molar mass | 202.041 g·mol^{−1} |
| Appearance | Colourless solid |
| Density | 1.76 g cm^{−3} |
| Melting point | 154 to 158 °C (309 to 316 °F; 427 to 431 K) |
| Solubility in water | low |

Hazards
- Occupational safety and health (OHS/OSH)
| Main hazards | Toxic |
- Except where otherwise noted, data are given for materials in their standard state (at 25 °C [77 °F], 100 kPa). Infobox references

Phenylarsonic acid is the organoarsenic compound with the formula C_{6}H_{5}AsO(OH)_{2}, commonly abbreviated PhAsO_{3}H_{2}. This colourless solid is an organic derivative of arsenic acid, AsO(OH)_{3}, where one OH group has been replaced by a phenyl group. The compound is a precursor to other arylarsonic acids.

== Preparation and structure ==
PhAsO_{3}H_{2} can be prepared by several routes. A common method is the "Bart reaction", named for Heinrich Bart, in which phenyldiazonium salts react with sodium arsenite in the presence of a copper catalyst. The method is reminiscent of the Sandmeyer reaction.

C_{6}H_{5}N^{+}_{2} + NaAsO_{3}H_{2} → C_{6}H_{5}AsO_{3}H_{2} + Na^{+} + N_{2}

Related derivatives are prepared similarly. It was first prepared by August Michaelis. X-ray crystallography shows short intermolecular O···O distances of 2.5 Å, consistent with hydrogen bonding. The arsenic center is tetrahedral.

== Related phenylarsonic acids ==
Several derivatives of phenylarsonic acid were once used as poultry feed additives. These include 4-hydroxy-3-nitrobenzenearsonic acid (3-NHPAA, or Roxarsone), p-arsanilic acid (p-ASA), 4-nitrophenylarsonic acid (nitarsone, 4-NPAA), and p-ureidophenylarsonic acid (carbarsone, p-UPAA). They are now banned in the US and EU.
