= Arsenicin A =

Chemical compound

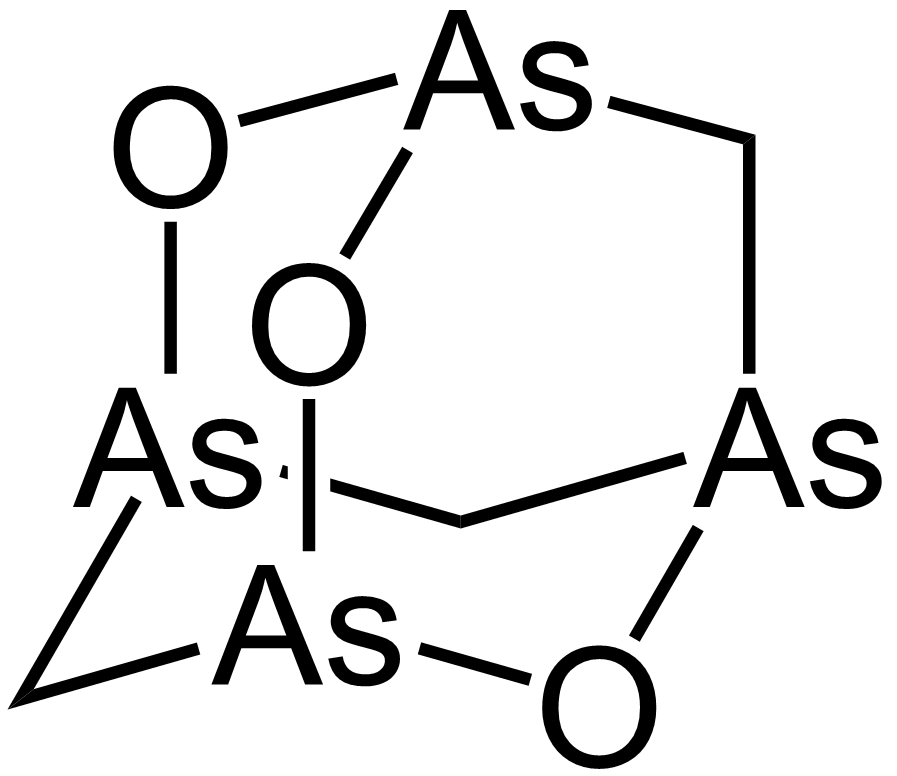
Structural formula of arsenicin A
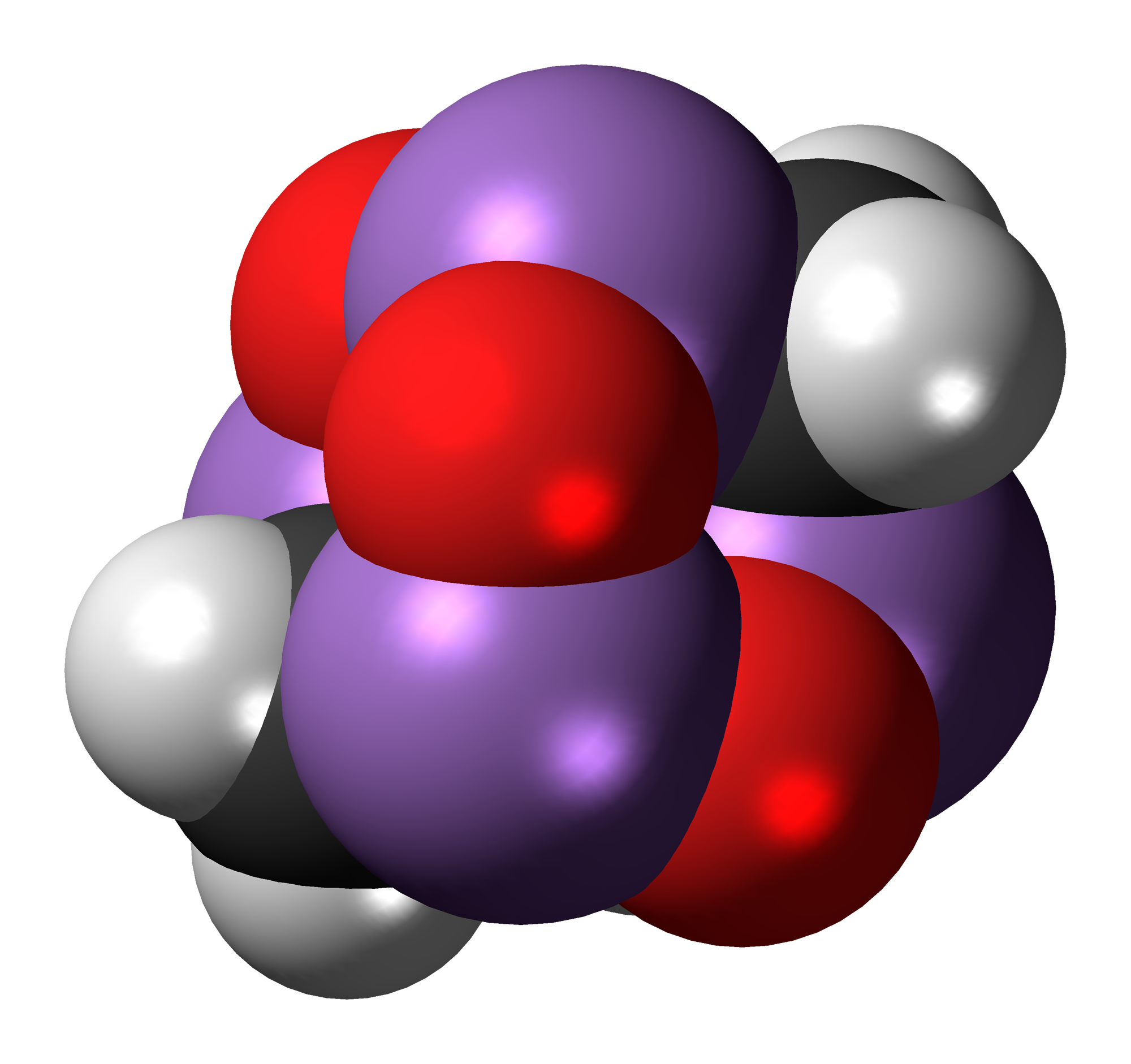
Spacefill model of arsenicin A

Names
- Preferred IUPAC name 2,4,6-Trioxa-1,3,5,7-tetraarsaadamantane

Identifiers
CAS Number	925705-41-5
3D model (JSmol)	Interactive image; Interactive image
ChemSpider	21430729
PubChem CID	16095534
UNII	597Y8O946Y
CompTox Dashboard (EPA)	DTXSID20582510
- InChI: InChI=1S/C3H6As4O3/c1-4-2-6-9-5(1)3-7(8-4)10-6/h1-3H2 Key: MHYDZXIVBJPPAM-UHFFFAOYSA-N
- SMILES: [As@@]1(O2)C[As@](O[As@]2C3)O[As@]3C1; C1[As]2C[As]3O[As]1C[As](O2)O3

Properties
Chemical formula	C_{3}H_{6}As_{4}O_{3}
Molar mass	389.764 g·mol^{−1}
Melting point	182 to 184 °C (360 to 363 °F; 455 to 457 K)
- Except where otherwise noted, data are given for materials in their standard state (at 25 °C [77 °F], 100 kPa). verify (what is ?) Infobox references

Arsenicin A is a naturally occurring arsenic heterocycle with the molecular formula C_{3}H_{6}As_{4}O_{3}. It was first isolated from the New Caledonian marine sponge Echinochalina bargibanti. The compound was characterized by computational and spectroscopic techniques and found to possess a cage-like structure similar to adamantane in which the four methanetriyl carbon bridgeheads are replaced by arsenic atoms and three of the six methylene bridges are replaced by oxygen atoms. It is the first polyarsenic compound ever found in nature. Subsequently, the proposed structure was prepared in large quantities via total synthesis and the structure was confirmed by x-ray crystallography. The molecule is chiral, and has been resolved into its two enantiomers. Arsenicin A is active against promyelocytic leukemia cells at lower concentrations than Trisenox.
