= Organoarsenic chemistry =

Chemistry of organic compounds with arsenic–carbon bond

Organoarsenic chemistry is the chemistry of compounds containing a chemical bond between arsenic and carbon. A few organoarsenic compounds, also called organoarsenicals, are produced industrially with uses as insecticides, herbicides, and fungicides. In general these applications are declining in step with growing concerns about their impact on the environment and human health. The parent compounds are arsane and arsenic acid. A few organoarsenic compounds can be found in nature.

== History ==
Cacodyl (tetramethyldiarsine) was one of the first organoarsenic compounds.

Organoarsenic chemistry played a prominent role in chemistry's history. The oldest known organoarsenic compound, the foul-smelling cacodyl (Cadet's fuming liquid), was reported in 1760. The compound's objectionable odor meant that it was not studied further until 1804, and its composition only identified in 1854. Subsequently the methyliodoarsenicals were identified through reaction of arsenite with methyl iodide and additional iodine.

The compound Salvarsan was one of the first synthetic chemotherapeutic agents, developed by Paul Ehrlich, who had earlier been awarded a Nobel Prize. Other organoarsenic compounds formerly had medicinal uses (e.g. Solarson).

The subject saw a great deal of research for chemical warfare during WWI.

== Synthesis and classification ==
Arsenic typically occurs in the oxidation states (III) and (V), illustrated by the halides AsX_{3} (X = F, Cl, Br, I) and AsF_{5}. Correspondingly, organoarsenic compounds are commonly found in these two oxidation states.

The following hydroxyarsenic compounds are known:

- arsonous acids (RAs(OH)_{2}), rare (arsenous acid (As(OH)_{3}) is well known)
- arsinous acids (R_{2}AsOH), rare
- arsinic acids (R_{2}As(O)OH), common, illustrated by cacodylic acid (R = CH_{3})
- arsonic acids (RAs(O)(OH)_{2}), common, illustrated by phenylarsonic acid (R = C_{6}H_{5})

=== Organoarsenic(V) compounds and uses ===
Arsenic(V) compounds typically feature the functional groups RAsO(OH)_{2} or R_{2}AsO(OH) (R = alkyl or aryl). Cacodylic acid, central to arsenic chemistry, arises from the methylation of arsenic(III) oxide. (In contrast, dimethylphosphinic acid is less significant in the corresponding chemistry of phosphorus.) Phenylarsonic acids can be accessed by the reaction of arsenic acid with anilines, the so-called Béchamp reaction.

The monomethylated acid, methanearsonic acid (CH_{3}AsO(OH)_{2}), is a precursor to fungicides (tradename Neoasozin) in the cultivation of rice and cotton. Derivatives of phenylarsonic acid (C_{6}H_{5}AsO(OH)_{2}) are used as feed additives for livestock, including 4-hydroxy-3-nitrobenzenearsonic acid (3-NHPAA or Roxarsone), ureidophenylarsonic acid and p-arsanilic acid. These applications are controversial as they introduce soluble forms of arsenic into the environment.

Compounds of arsenic(V) containing only organic ligands are rare. The pre-eminent member is the pentaphenyl derivative As(C_{6}H_{5})_{5}.

Thorin can be used as a chromogenic indicator in the spectrophotometric determination of various metals.

=== Organoarsenic(III) compounds ===
Many tertiary arsines are prepared by alkylation of AsCl_{3} using organolithium and Grignard reagents. Symmetrical organoarsenic(III) compounds, e.g. trimethylarsine and triphenylarsine, are well established. The inversion barriers (ΔG*) for tertiary arsines have been shown to be near 42 kcal/mol. By contrast, the inversion of a tertiary phosphine occurs with barriers near 30 kcal/mol.

Tertiary arsines form a variety of metal complexes. They behave like phosphine ligands, but are less basic. The diarsine C_{6}H_{4}(As(CH_{3})_{2})_{2}, known as diars, is a chelating ligand.

Many halide-containing alkyl and aryl arsines are known, their preparation once being motivated by applications in chemical warfare. Dimethylarsenic chloride ((CH_{3})_{2}AsCl) and methylarsenic dichloride (CH_{3}AsCl_{2}) are simple examples. Infamous examples include "Lewisite" (2-chlorovinyldichloroarsine) and "Clark I" (chlorodiphenylarsine). "Phenyl Dick" (Phenyldichloroarsine) is another. The latter compounds are produced through Friedel-Crafts-type reactions, combining acetylene or benzene with arsenic trichloride and catalytic aluminum chloride.

Akin to the Direct process in organosilicon chemistry, methyl halides react with elemental As, as illustrated in the following idealized equation:

3 CH_{3}Br + 2 As → (CH_{3})_{2}AsBr + CH_{3}AsBr_{2}

Such reactions, which require copper catalysts (like the direct process), are conducted near 360 °C.

In general, tertiary arsines redistribute with arsenic trichloride to give organoarsenic halides of corresponding stoichiometry. Asymmetrical arsines can be produced through a sequence of (alternating) halogenations and then couplings with a Grignard reagent.

Reduction of the halide derivatives with hydride reagents affords the corresponding hydrides, such as dimethylarsine ((CH_{3})_{2}AsH) and methylarsine (CH_{3}AsH_{2}). tert-Butylarsine ((CH_{3})_{3}CAsH_{2}) is used as a precursor to arsenic-containing III-V semiconductors.

Another route to dimethylarsenic compounds begins with reduction of cacodylic acid:

(CH_{3})_{2}AsO_{2}H + 2 Zn + 4 HCl → (CH_{3})_{2}AsH + 2 ZnCl_{2} + 2 H_{2}O
(CH_{3})_{2}AsO_{2}H + SO_{2} + HI → (CH_{3})_{2}AsI + SO_{3} + H_{2}O

Such reduction with sulfur dioxide is in fact quite general.

A variety of heterocycles containing arsenic(III) are known. These include arsoles, the arsenic analogues of pyrroles and arsabenzenes, the arsenic analogues of pyridines.

=== Lower-order organoarsenic compounds and uses ===
Structure of 2,6-dimesitylphenylarsenic dimer as determined by X-ray crystallography Color code: light gray = As, black = C, small white spheres= H.

Rings of As atoms are well known. They feature tricoordinate, pyramidal As. They have formal oxidation state As^{I}. Synthesis is typically by reductive dehalogenation. Oligomers with As-As bonds include the antisyphylitic drugs Salvarsan and Neosalvarsan.

Per the double bond rule, compounds with As=As and As=C bonds are rare. They are observed in the gas phase, but considerable steric protection is required to inhibit oligomerization of these species as solids. One example is (_{2},_{6}−(_{2},_{4},_{6}−(CH_{3})_{3}C_{6}H_{2})_{2}C_{6}H_{3}As=AsC_{6}H^{−}_{3}_{2},^{−}_{6}(_{2},_{4},^{−}_{6}CH_{3})_{3}C_{6}H_{2}). In this compound, the As=As distance is 228 pm vs the As-As single bond length of 246 pm in (C_{6}H_{5}As)_{6}. Whereas almost all organoarsenic compounds are colorless, those with As=As bonds are pale yellow. Arsaalkynes (RC≡As are also known, but again only with bulky substituents.

== Reactions ==
Primary arsines (formula:RAsH_{2}) oxidize to oligomers. For example, methylarsine oxidizes first to cyclo-methylarsine(I):

MeAsH_{2} + O → H_{2}O + (MeAs)_{n}

These compounds have As-As bonds.

Compounds containing As-As bonds are prone to oxidation.

In general, arsines are less Brønsted basic than phosphines (but more than stibines). In moist air, oxidation continues past the arsine oxide: hydrolysis and further oxidation gives a arsinic acid and an alcohol.

Arsine ylides, in contrast to analogous phosphine ylides, are a poorly developed class of compounds.

== In nature ==
Inorganic arsenic compounds are metabolized through methylation. The conversions are mediated by enzymes related to vitamin B_{12}.

The mold Scopulariopsis brevicaulis produces significant amounts of trimethylarsine if inorganic arsenic is present. Biomethylation of arsenic compounds starts with the formation of methanearsonates. Trivalent inorganic arsenic compounds are methylated to give methanearsonate. S-adenosylmethionine is the methyl donor. The methanearsonates are the precursors to dimethylarsonates, again by the cycle of reduction (to methylarsonous acid) followed by a second methylation. This dimethyl compound is cacodylic acid ((CH_{3})_{2}AsO_{2}H),

The organic compound arsenobetaine, a betaine, is found in some marine fish and algae as well as in mushrooms in larger concentrations. The average person's intake is about 10-50 μg/day. Values of about 1000 μg are not unusual following consumption of fish or mushrooms. There is however little danger in eating fish because this arsenic compound is nearly non-toxic. Arsenobetaine was first identified in the Western rock lobster.

So-called arsenosugars have been isolated from seaweeds. Arsenic-containing lipids are also known.

The only polyarsenic compound isolated from a natural source is arsenicin A, found in the New Caledonian marine sponge Echinochalina bargibanti.

Organoarsenic compounds may pose significant health hazards, depending on their speciation. For comparison, arsenous acid (As(OH)_{3}) has an LD50 of 34.5 mg/kg (mice) whereas for the betaine (CH_{3})_{3}As^{+}CH_{2}CO_{2}^{−} the LD50 exceeds 10 g/kg.

== Representative compounds ==
Representative organoarsenic compounds
Name	Structure	CAS number	Comments
10,10'-oxybis-10H-Phenoxarsine	10,10'-oxybis-10H-Phenoxarsine	58-36-6	obsolete plastic additive
Triphenylarsine	Triphenylarsine	603-32-7	Melts 58-61 °C, occasional ligand in coordination chemistry, reagent in organic synthesis
Phenyldichloroarsine		696-28-6	Obsolete chemical weapon
Roxarsone		121-19-7	llegal (EU, US) animal feed additive - see also nitarsone, arsanilic acid, and carbarsone
Arsenobetaine	Arsenobetaine	64436-13-1	Most common form of arsenic in seafood, low toxicity with a short blood half-life
Arsenicin A	2,4,6-Trioxa-1,3,5,7-tetraarsatricyclo[3.3.1.13,7]decane	925705-41-5	Melts 182–184 °C (360–363 °F), Cytotoxic natural product

== See also ==
- Arsenic biochemistry
- Arsenic poisoning
- Category:Arsenic compounds
