= Hemihydrate =

Solid substance containing one water molecule per two unit cells

In chemistry, a hemihydrate (or semihydrate) is a hydrate whose solid contains one molecule of water of crystallization per two other molecules, or per two unit cells. This is sometimes characterized as a solid that has one "half molecule" of water per unit cell. An example of this is calcium sulfate hemihydrate (CaSO_{4}·0.5H_{2}O or 2CaSO_{4}·H_{2}O), which is the hemihydrate of calcium sulfate (CaSO_{4}).
