= Arsenobetaine =

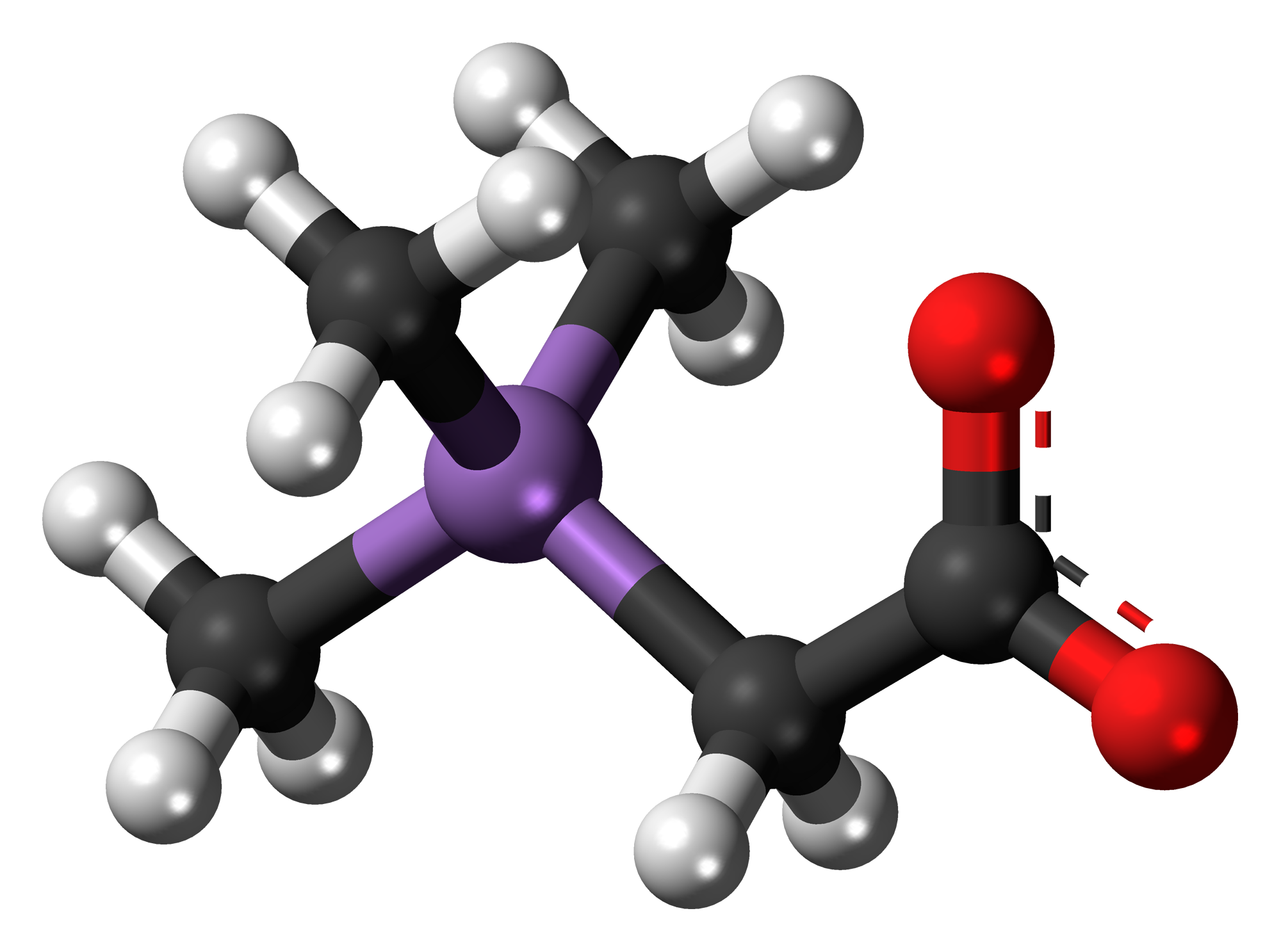

Names
- Preferred IUPAC name (Trimethylarsaniumyl)acetate

Identifiers
CAS Number	64436-13-1
3D model (JSmol)	Interactive image; Interactive image
Beilstein Reference	3933180
ChEBI	CHEBI:82392
ChEMBL	ChEMBL2448348
ChemSpider	43109
ECHA InfoCard	100.162.654
EC Number	634-697-3
KEGG	C19331
MeSH	Arsenobetaine
PubChem CID	47364
RTECS number	CH9750000
UNII	UWC1LS4V3I
CompTox Dashboard (EPA)	DTXSID0052833
- InChI: InChI=1S/C5H11AsO2/c1-6(2,3)4-5(7)8/h4H2,1-3H3 Key: SPTHHTGLGVZZRH-UHFFFAOYSA-N; InChI=1/C5H11AsO2/c1-6(2,3)4-5(7)8/h4H2,1-3H3 Key: SPTHHTGLGVZZRH-UHFFFAOYAQ
- SMILES: C[As+](C)(C)CC(=O)[O-]; C[As+](C)(C)CC([O-])=O

Properties
Chemical formula	C_{5}H_{11}AsO_{2}
Molar mass	177.99/ g.mol^{−1}

Hazards
- GHS labelling
Pictograms	(GHS06: Toxic) (GHS09: Environmental hazard)
Signal word	Danger
Hazard statements	H301, H331, H410
Precautionary statements	P261, P264, P270, P271, P273, P301+P310, P304+P340, P311, P321, P330, P391, P403+P233, P405, P501
- Except where otherwise noted, data are given for materials in their standard state (at 25 °C [77 °F], 100 kPa). verify (what is ?) Infobox references

Arsenobetaine is an organoarsenic compound found primarily in fish and other marine life, as well as some fungi. It is the arsenic analog of trimethylglycine, commonly known as betaine. The biochemistry and biosynthesis of this molecule are similar to those of choline and glycine betaine.

Arsenobetaine is a common substance in marine biological systems and unlike many other organoarsenic compounds, such as trimethylarsine, it is relatively non-toxic. The compound may play a similar role as urea does for nitrogen, as a non-toxic waste compound made in the bodies of animals to dispose of the relevant element.

It has been known since 1920 that marine fish contain organoarsenic compounds, but it was not until 1977 that the chemical structure of arsenobetaine was determined.

Arsenobetaine may be synthesized in the lab from trimethylarsine and ethyl bromoacetate, followed by basic saponification of the resulting ester such as by using a Dowex 2 (HO^{-}) exchange resin column:

Me_{3}As + BrCH_{2}CO_{2}Et → Me_{3}As^{+}CH_{2}CO_{2}Et + Br^{−}

Me_{3}As^{+}CH_{2}CO_{2}Et + HO^{−} → Me_{3}As^{+}CH_{2}CO^{−}_{2} + EtOH

== Safety ==
Whereas arsenous acid (As(OH)_{3}) has an LD_{50} in mice of 34.5 mg/kg, the LD_{50} for the arsenobetaine exceeds 10 g/kg.
