= P-Azobenzenearsonate =

p-Azobenzenearsonate
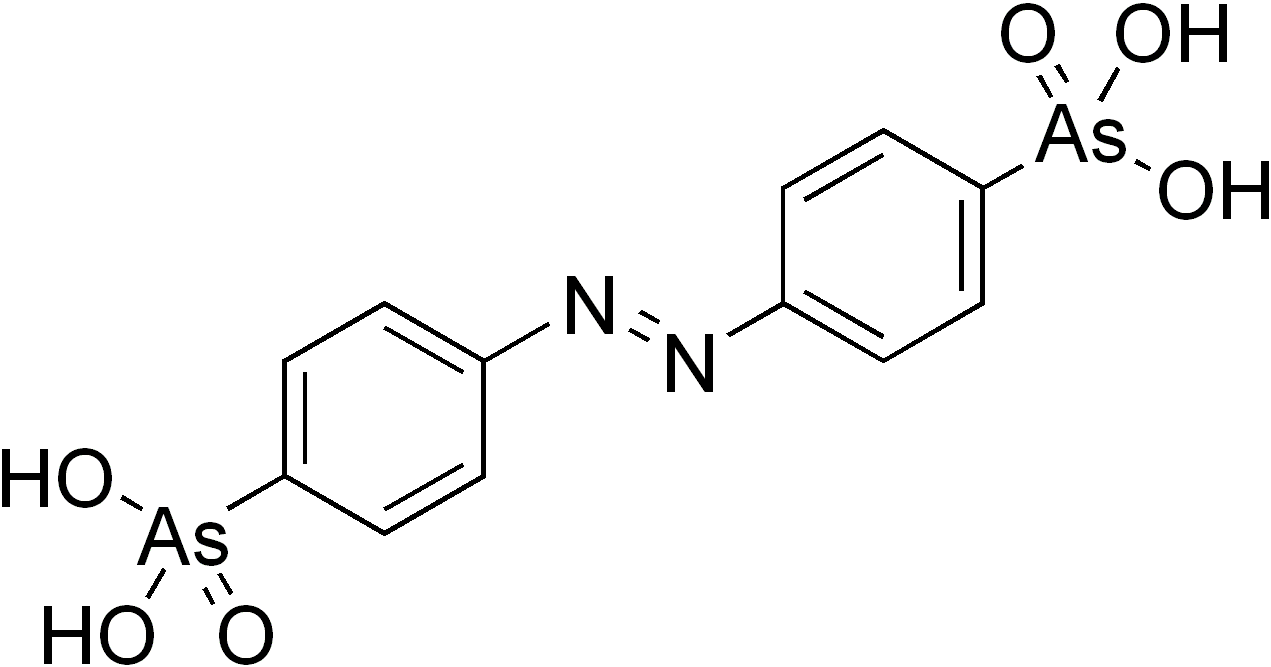
- Structural formula of p-azobenzenearsonate

Names
- Preferred IUPAC name [Diazene-1,2-diyldi-4,1-phenylene]bis(arsonic acid)
- Systematic IUPAC name {4-[2-(4-Arsonophenyl)diazen-1-yl]phenyl}arsonic acid

Identifiers
| CAS Number | 7334-23-8 (E)-Diazen-1-yl |
| 3D model (JSmol) | Interactive image; Interactive image |
| Beilstein Reference | 3161641 |
| ChEBI | CHEBI:53554 |
| ChemSpider | 22205 (E)-Diazen-1-yl |
| MeSH | p-Azobenzenearsonate |
| PubChem CID | 23749 (E)-Diazen-1-yl |
| UNII | AFL9LS9ZBF |
| CompTox Dashboard (EPA) | DTXSID501028210 |
- InChI: InChI=1S/C12H12As2N2O6/c17-13(18,19)9-1-5-11(6-2-9)15-16-12-7-3-10(4-8-12)14(20,21)22/h1-8H,(H2,17,18,19)(H2,20,21,22) Key: ITRMROGJSNWFKO-UHFFFAOYSA-N
- SMILES: O[As](O)(=O)c2ccc(/N=N/c1ccc(cc1)[As](O)(O)=O)cc2; O[As](O)(=O)C1=CC=C(C=C1)N=NC1=CC=C(C=C1)[As](O)(O)=O

Properties
| Chemical formula | C_{12}H_{12}As_{2}N_{2}O_{6} |
| Molar mass | 430.079 g·mol^{−1} |
- Except where otherwise noted, data are given for materials in their standard state (at 25 °C [77 °F], 100 kPa). Infobox references

p-Azobenzenearsonate is an arsenical. It causes antibody formation and delayed hypersensitivity when bound to aromatic amino acids, polypeptides or proteins. It is used as an immunologic research tool.
