= Difetarsone =

Chemical compound

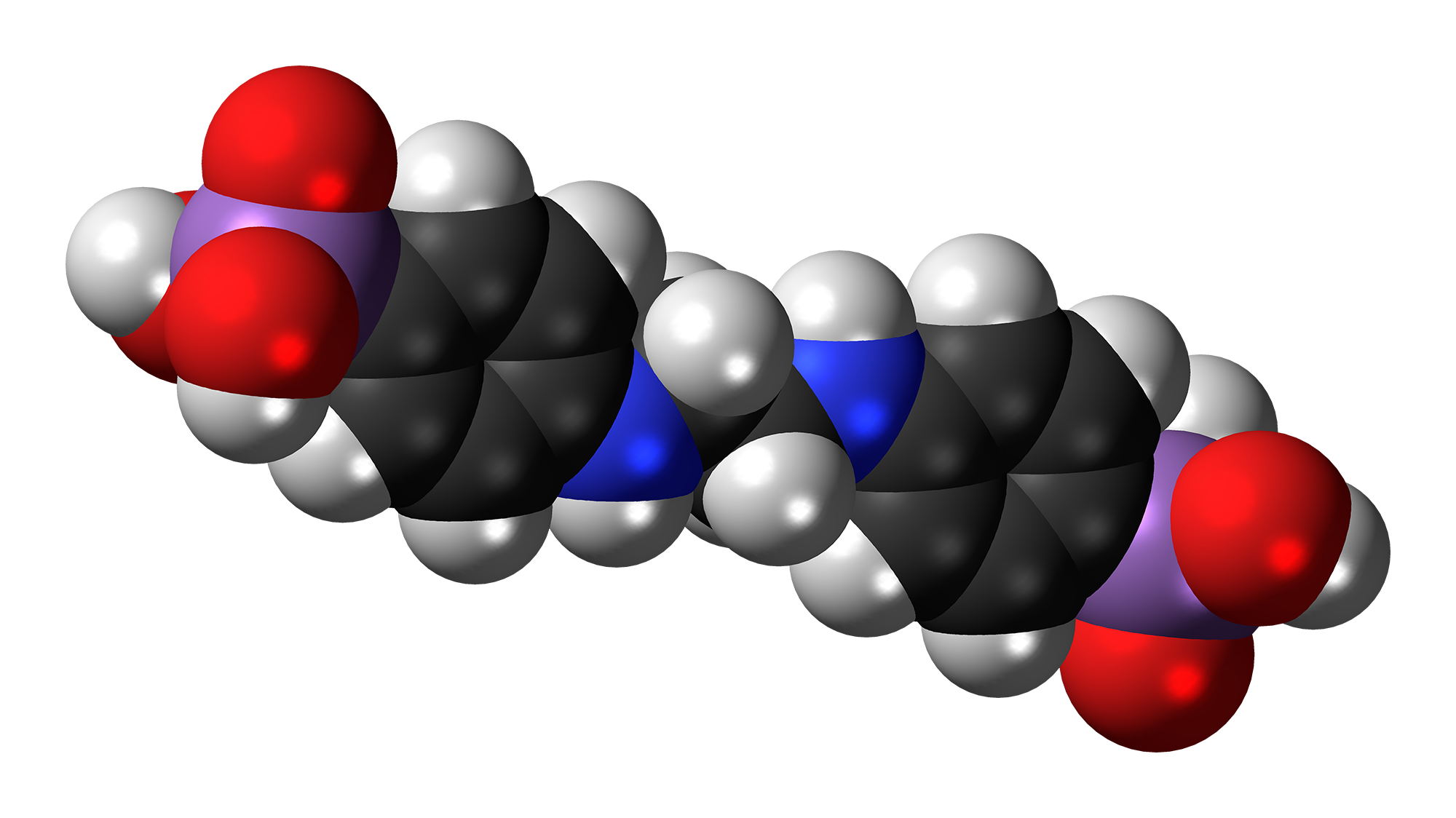

Clinical data
- ATC code: P01AR02 (WHO) QP51AD02 (WHO)

Identifiers
- IUPAC name: [4-[2-[(4-arsonophenyl)amino]ethylamino]phenyl] arsonic acid
- CAS Number: 3639-19-8
- PubChem CID: 68199
- DrugBank: DB13599
- ChemSpider: 61506
- UNII: G4G9J3Q65W
- KEGG: D07357
- CompTox Dashboard (EPA): DTXSID30189913
- ECHA InfoCard: 100.020.788

Chemical and physical data
- Formula: C_{14}H_{18}As_{2}N_{2}O_{6}
- Molar mass: 460.149 g·mol^{−1}

Difetarsone is an antiprotozoal agent. Various studies have shown it to be particularly effective against Trichuris trichiura, commonly known as the whipworm. Prior to the drugs use in the early 1970s, there were few effective treatments for this infection. It has also been used to treat Entamoeba histolytica infections.

Difetarsone often has minor side effects, which include rashes, nausea and vomiting. It has also resulted in angioedema in at least one known case.
