= Fowler's solution =

Chemical compound

Fowler's solution consists of 1% potassium arsenite (KAsO_{2}) in water and was first described and published as a potential treatment for malaria and syphilis in the late 1700s and was once also prescribed as a tonic. Thomas Fowler (1736–1801) of Stafford, England, proposed the solution in 1786 as a substitute for a patent medicine, "tasteless ague drop". It was known at the time as "Liquor Arsenicalis". From 1865, Fowler's solution was a leukemia treatment.

From 1905, inorganic arsenicals like Fowler's solution saw diminished use as attention turned to organic arsenicals, starting with Atoxyl.

As inorganic arsenic compounds are notably toxic and carcinogenic—with side effects such as cirrhosis of the liver, idiopathic portal hypertension, urinary bladder cancer, and skin cancers—Fowler's solution fell from use. In 2001, however, the U.S. Food and Drug Administration (FDA) approved a drug of arsenic trioxide to treat acute promyelocytic leukaemia, and interest in arsenic chemistry has returned.
