= Arsenous acid =

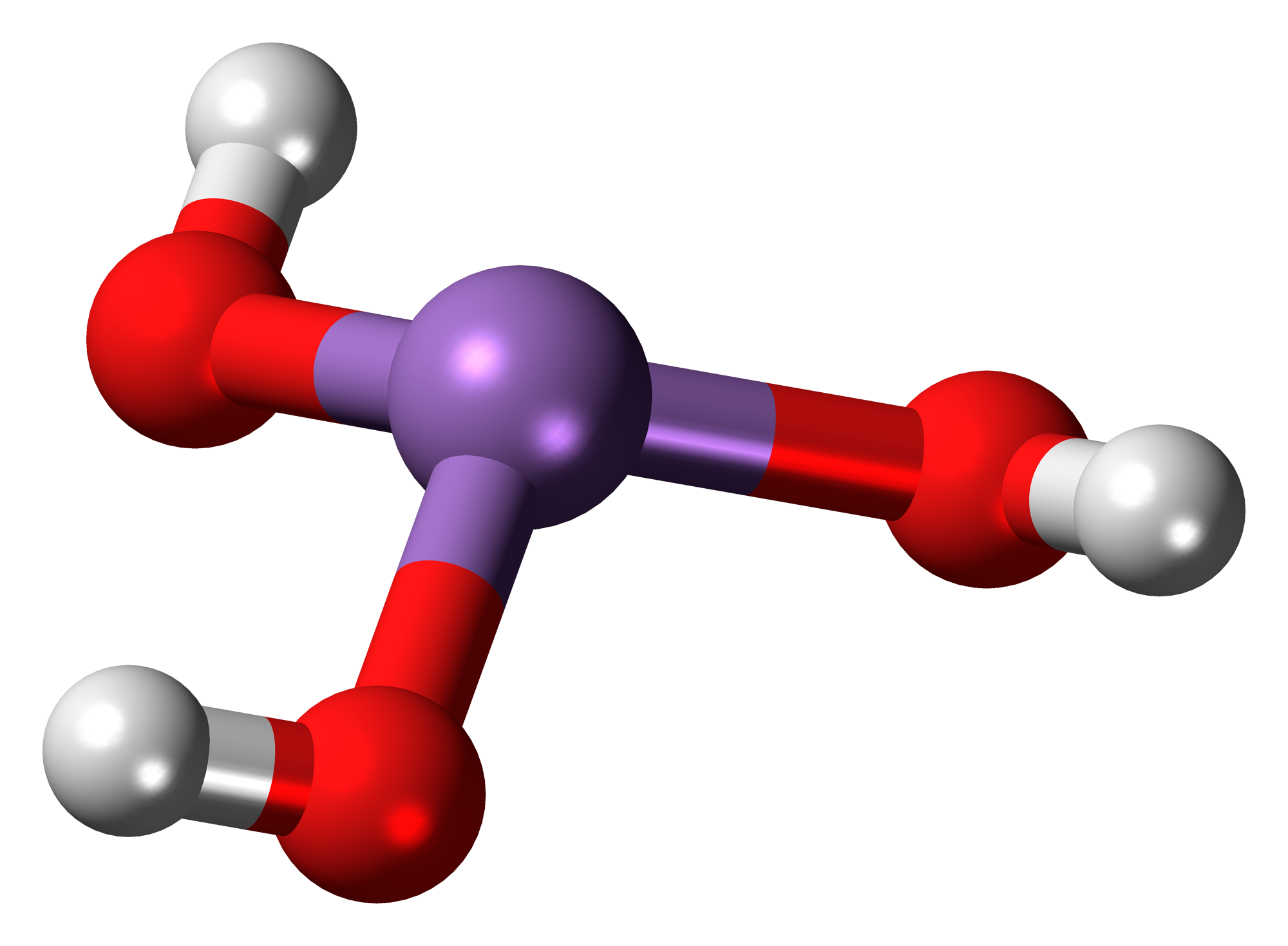

Names
- IUPAC name Arsorous acid
- Other names Arsenious acid Arsenic oxide

Identifiers
CAS Number	13464-58-9
3D model (JSmol)	Interactive image
ChEBI	CHEBI:49900
ChemSpider	530
DrugBank	DB04456
PubChem CID	545
UNII	935XD1L5K2
CompTox Dashboard (EPA)	DTXSID7074828
- InChI: InChI=1S/AsH3O3/c2-1(3)4/h2-4H Key: GCPXMJHSNVMWNM-UHFFFAOYSA-N; InChI=1/AsH3O3/c2-1(3)4/h2-4H Key: GCPXMJHSNVMWNM-UHFFFAOYAA
- SMILES: O[As](O)O

Properties
Chemical formula	H_{3}AsO_{3}
Molar mass	125.94 g/mol
Appearance	Only exists in aqueous solutions
Conjugate base	Arsenite
Magnetic susceptibility (χ)	-51.2·10^{−6} cm^{3}/mol

Hazards
- Occupational safety and health (OHS/OSH)
Main hazards	Toxic, corrosive
- NIOSH (US health exposure limits)
PEL (Permissible)	[1910.1018] TWA 0.010 mg/m^{3}
REL (Recommended)	Ca C 0.002 mg/m^{3} [15-minute]
IDLH (Immediate danger)	Ca [5 mg/m^{3} (as As)]

Related compounds
Related compounds	Arsenic acid
- Except where otherwise noted, data are given for materials in their standard state (at 25 °C [77 °F], 100 kPa). verify (what is ?) Infobox references

Arsenous acid (or arsorous acid) is the inorganic compound with the formula H_{3}AsO_{3}, more descriptively written as As(OH)_{3}. It is an acid known to occur in aqueous solutions. It has not been isolated as a pure material, although this fact does not detract from its significance.

== Properties ==
Phosphorous acid exists as the dihydroxy tautomer in contrast to arsenous acid.

As(OH)_{3} is a pyramidal molecule consisting of three hydroxyl groups bonded to arsenic. The ^{1}H NMR spectrum of arsenous acid solutions consists of a single signal consistent with the molecule's high symmetry. In contrast, the nominally related phosphorous acid H_{3}PO_{3} adopts the structure HPO(OH)_{2}. The structural analogue of arsenous acid (P(OH)_{3}) is a very minor equilibrium component of such solutions. The differing behaviors of the As and P compounds reflect a trend whereby high oxidation states are more stable for lighter members of main group elements than their heavier congeners. One tautomer of arsenous acid would have the formula HAsO(OH)_{2}, called arsonic acid, but it has not been characterized.

Coordination complexes of arsenous acid, i.e., complexes with the linkage M-As(OH)3, have been characterized by X-ray crystallography.

== Synthesis ==
The preparation of As(OH)_{3} involves a slow hydrolysis of arsenic trioxide in water.

== Reactions ==
Addition of base converts arsenous acid to the arsenite ions [AsO(OH)_{2}]^{−}, [AsO_{2}(OH)]^{2−}, and [AsO_{3}]^{3−}. With its first pK_{a} being 9.2, As(OH)_{3} is a weak acid. Reactions attributed to aqueous arsenic trioxide are due to arsenous acid and its conjugate bases.

Like arsenic trioxide, arsenous acid is sometimes amphoteric. For example, it reacts with hydrochloric, hydrobromic, and hydroiodic acids to produce arsenic trichloride, tribromide, and triiodide.

As(OH)_{3} + 3 HX ⇌ AsX_{3} + 3 H_{2}O (X = Cl, Br, I)

Reaction of arsenous acid with methyl iodide gives methylarsonic acid. This historically significant conversion is the Meyer reaction:

As(OH)_{3} + CH_{3}I + NaOH ⇌ CH_{3}AsO(OH)_{2} + NaI + H_{2}O

Alkylation occurs at arsenic, and the oxidation state of arsenic increases from +3 to +5.

== Toxicology ==
Arsenic-containing compounds are highly toxic and carcinogenic. The anhydride form of arsenous acid, arsenic trioxide, is used as a herbicide, pesticide, and rodenticide.
