= Arsanilic acid =

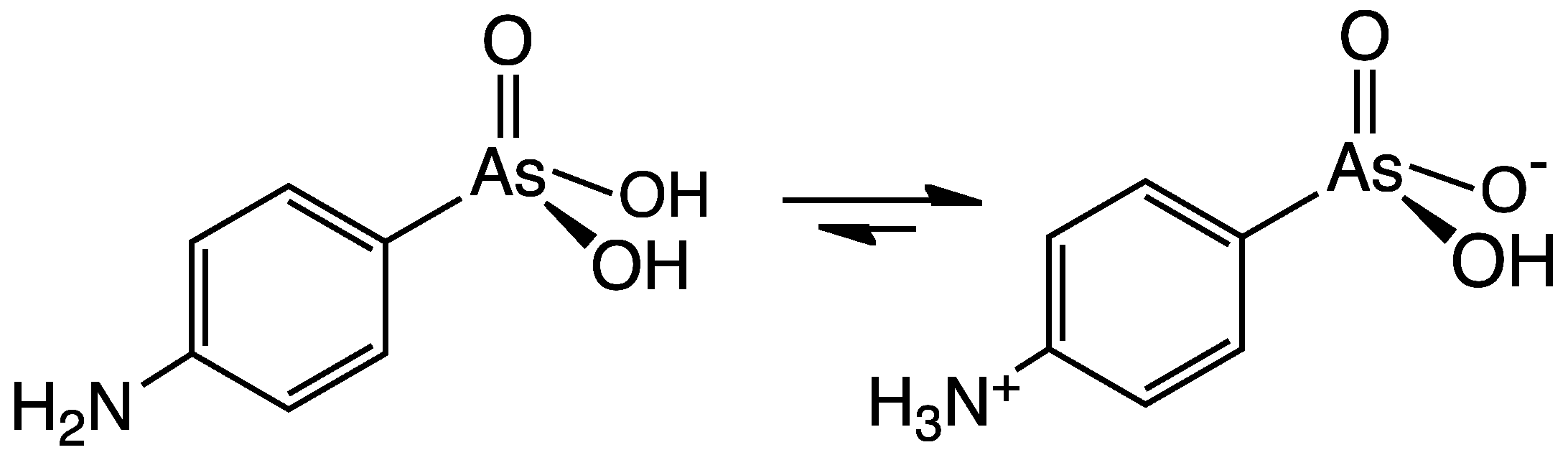
- Chemical structure of arsanilic acid

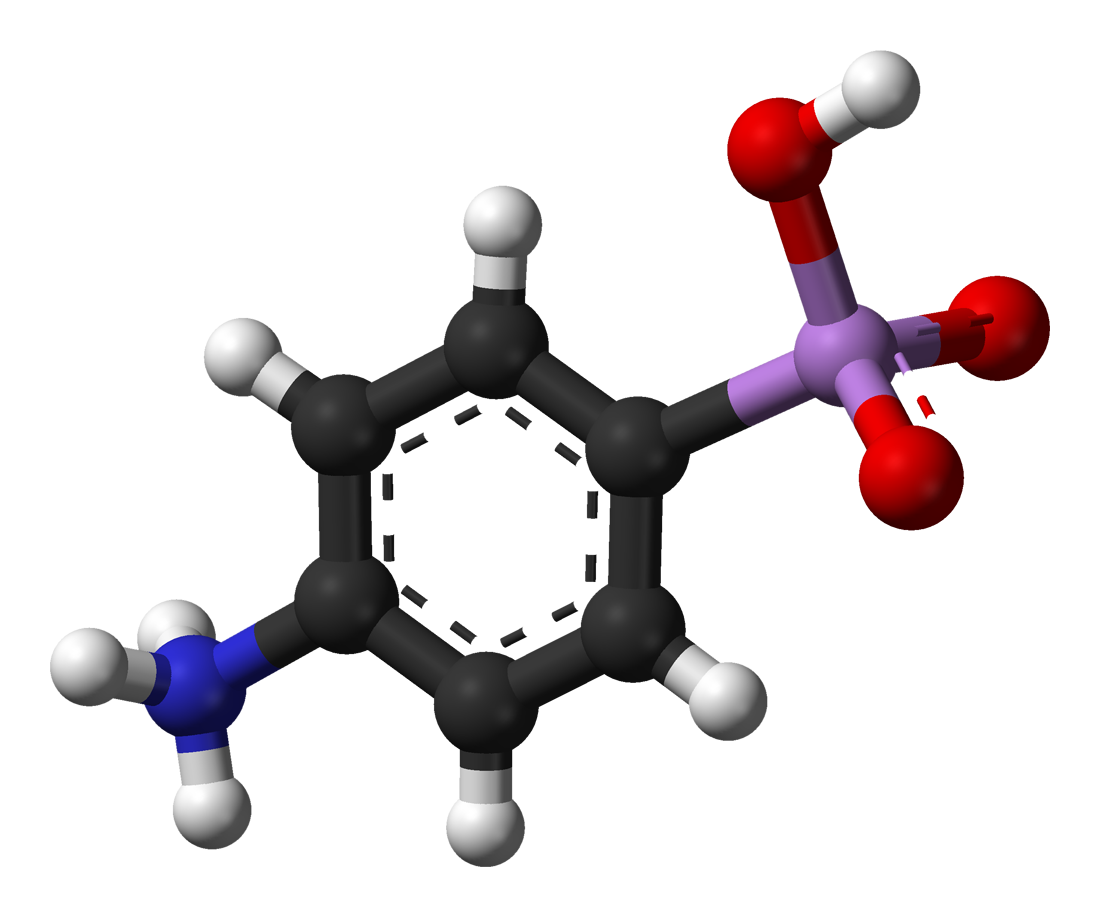
- Ball-and-stick model of the solid-state zwitterionic structure of arsanilic acid

Names
- Preferred IUPAC name (4-Aminophenyl)arsonic acid
- Other names: 4-Aminobenzenearsonic acid; 4-Aminophenylarsonic acid; 4-Arsanilic acid; Atoxyl

Identifiers
CAS Number	98-50-0
3D model (JSmol)	Interactive image; zwitterion: Interactive image
Beilstein Reference	1102334
ChEBI	CHEBI:49477
ChEMBL	ChEMBL351769
ChemSpider	7111
DrugBank	DB03006
ECHA InfoCard	100.002.432
EC Number	202-674-3
Gmelin Reference	406354
PubChem CID	7389
UNII	UDX9AKS7GM
CompTox Dashboard (EPA)	DTXSID8035138
- InChI: InChI=1S/C6H8AsNO3/c8-6-3-1-5(2-4-6)7(9,10)11/h1-4H,8H2,(H2,9,10,11) Key: XKNKHVGWJDPIRJ-UHFFFAOYSA-N; InChI=1/C6H8AsNO3/c8-6-3-1-5(2-4-6)7(9,10)11/h1-4H,8H2,(H2,9,10,11) Key: XKNKHVGWJDPIRJ-UHFFFAOYAQ
- SMILES: O=[As](O)(O)c1ccc(N)cc1; zwitterion: O=[As]([O-])(O)c1ccc([NH3+])cc1

Properties
Chemical formula	C_{6}H_{8}AsNO_{3}
Molar mass	217.054 g/mol
Appearance	white solid
Density	1.957 g/cm^{3}
Melting point	232 °C (450 °F; 505 K)
Solubility in water	modest

Hazards
- Occupational safety and health (OHS/OSH)
Main hazards	Toxic
- GHS labelling
Pictograms	(GHS06: Toxic) (GHS09: Environmental hazard)
Signal word	Danger
Hazard statements	H301, H331, H410
NFPA 704 (fire diamond)	2 0 0

Related compounds
Related compounds	phenylarsonic acid
- Except where otherwise noted, data are given for materials in their standard state (at 25 °C [77 °F], 100 kPa). verify (what is ?) Infobox references

Arsanilic acid, also known as aminophenyl arsenic acid or aminophenyl arsonic acid, is an organoarsenic compound, an amino derivative of phenylarsonic acid whose amine group is in the 4-position. A crystalline powder introduced medically in the late 19th century as Atoxyl, its sodium salt was used by injection in the early 20th century as the first organic arsenical drug, but it was soon found prohibitively toxic for human use.

Arsanilic acid saw long use as a veterinary feed additive promoting growth and to prevent or treat dysentery in poultry and swine. In 2013, its approval by US government as an animal drug was voluntarily withdrawn by its sponsors. Still sometimes used in laboratories, arsanilic acid's legacy is principally through its influence on Paul Ehrlich in launching the antimicrobial chemotherapy approach to treating infectious diseases of humans.

== Chemistry ==
Synthesis was first reported in 1863 by Antoine Béchamp and became the basis of the Bechamp reaction. The process involves the reaction of aniline and arsenic acid via an electrophilic aromatic substitution reaction.

C_{6}H_{5}NH_{2} + H_{3}AsO_{4} → H_{2}O_{3}AsC_{6}H_{4}NH_{2} + H_{2}O

Arsanilic acid occurs as a zwitterion, H_{3}N^{+}C_{6}H_{4}AsO_{3}H^{−}, yet is typically represented with the non-zwitterionic formula H_{2}NC_{6}H_{4}AsO_{3}H_{2}.

== History ==
=== Roots and synthesis ===
Since at least 2000 BC, arsenic and inorganic arsenical compounds were both medicine and poison. In the 19th century, inorganic arsenicals became the preeminent medicines, for instance Fowler's solution, against diverse diseases.

In 1859, in France, while developing aniline dyes, Antoine Béchamp synthesized a chemical that he identified, if incorrectly, as arsenic acid anilide. Also biologist, physician, and pharmacist, Béchamp reported it 40 to 50 times less toxic as a drug than arsenic acid, and named it Atoxyl, the first organic arsenical drug.

=== Medical influence ===
In 1905, in Britain, H W Thomas and A Breinl reported successful treatment of trypanosomiasis in animals by Atoxyl, and recommended high doses, given continuously, for human trypanosomiasis (sleeping sickness). By 1907, more successful and less toxic than inorganic arsenicals, Atoxyl was expected to greatly aid expansion of British colonization of Africa and stem loss of cattle in Africa and India. (So socioeconomically valuable was colonial medicine that in 1922, German company Bayer offered to reveal the formula of Bayer 205—developed in 1917 and showing success on sleeping sickness in British and Belgian Africa—to the British government for return of German colonies lost via World War I.)

Soon, however, Robert Koch found through an Atoxyl trial in German East Africa that some 2% of patients were blinded via atrophy of the optic nerve. In Germany, Paul Ehrlich inferred Béchamp's report of Atoxyl's structure incorrectly, and Ehrlich with his chief organic chemist Alfred Bertheim found its correct structure—aminophenyl arsenic acid or aminophenyl arsonic acid—which suggested possible derivatives. Ehrlich asked Bertheim to synthesize two types of Atoxyl derivatives: arsenoxides and arsenobenzenes.

Ehrlich and Bertheim's 606th arsenobenzene, synthesized in 1907, was arsphenamine, found ineffective against trypanosomes, but found in 1909 by Ehrlich and bacteriologist Sahachiro Hata effective against the microorganism involved in syphilis, a disease roughly equivalent then to today's AIDS. The company Farbwerke Hoechst marketed arsphenamine as the drug Salvarsan, "the arsenic that saves". Its specificity of action fit Ehrlich's silver bullet or magic bullet paradigm of treatment, and Ehrlich won international fame while Salvarsan's success—the first particularly effective syphilis treatment—established the chemotherapy enterprise. In the late 1940s, Salvarsan was replaced in most regions by penicillin, yet organic arsenicals remained in use for trypanosomiasis.

=== Contemporary usage ===
Arsanilic acid gained use as a feed additive for poultry and swine to promote growth and prevent or treat dysentery. For poultry and swine, arsanilic acid was among four arsenical veterinary drugs, along with carbarsone, nitarsone, roxarsone, approved by the U.S. Food and Drug Administration (FDA). In 2013, the FDA denied petitions by the Center for Food Safety and by the Institute for Agriculture and Trade Policy seeking revocation of approvals of the arsenical animal drugs, but the drugs' sponsors voluntarily requested the FDA to withdraw approvals of three, including arsanilic acid, leaving only nitarsone approved. In 2015, the FDA withdrew nitarsone's approval.

Arsanilic acid is still used in the laboratory, for instance in recent modification of nanoparticles.

It is a reagent for the detection of nitrite in urinalysis dipsticks.
