= Thorin (chemistry) =

- Structural formula of ((4E)-4-hydrazin-1-ylidene)-thorin

Names
- Preferred IUPAC name Disodium 3-hydroxy-4-[(2-arsonophenyl)diazenyl]naphthalene-2,7-disulfonate
- Systematic IUPAC name Disodium 4-[2-(2-arsonophenyl)hydrazin-1-ylidene]-3-oxo-3,4-dihydronaphthalene-2,7-disulfonate
- Other names Disodium 4-[2-(2-arsonophenyl)hydrazin-1-ylidene]-3-oxonaphthalene-2,7-disulfonate 2-(3,6-Disulfo-2-hydroxy-1-naphthylazo)benzenearsonic acid disodium salt Thoron Thoronol

Identifiers
CAS Number	3688-92-4 (4E)-4-hydrazin-1-ylidene
3D model (JSmol)	Interactive image; Interactive image
Beilstein Reference	2957648
ChemSpider	5020708 (4E)-4-hydrazin-1-ylidene; 4895471
ECHA InfoCard	100.020.903
EC Number	222-993-1
PubChem CID	77269; 6537679 (4E)-4-hydrazin-1-ylidene
UNII	LFP7CNK4M5
UN number	1557
CompTox Dashboard (EPA)	DTXSID20893911
- InChI: InChI=1S/C16H13AsN2O10S2.2Na/c20-16-14(31(27,28)29)8-9-7-10(30(24,25)26)5-6-11(9)15(16)19-18-13-4-2-1-3-12(13)17(21,22)23;;/h1-8,18H,(H2,21,22,23)(H,24,25,26)(H,27,28,29);;/q;2*+1/p-2 Key: ZQMPNLOZJUWHSA-UHFFFAOYSA-L; Key: DCSRPHQBFSYJNN-GJLVVKPQBS; InChI=1/C16H13AsN2O10S2.2Na/c20-16-14(31(27,28)29)8-9-7-10(30(24,25)26)5-6-11(9)15(16)19-18-13-4-2-1-3-12(13)17(21,22)23;;/h1-8,20H,(H2,21,22,23)(H,24,25,26)(H,27,28,29);;/q;2*+1/p-2/b19-18+;;
- SMILES: [Na+].[Na+].O[As](O)(=O)c3ccccc3/N=N/c1c2ccc(cc2cc(c1O)S([O-])(=O)=O)S([O-])(=O)=O; [Na+].[Na+].O[As](O)(=O)C1=CC=CC=C1NN=C1C(=O)C(=CC2=C1C=CC(=C2)S([O-])(=O)=O)S([O-])(=O)=O

Properties
Chemical formula	C_{16}H_{11}AsN_{2}O_{10}S_{2}
Molar mass	530.31 g·mol^{−1}
Appearance	Orange-yellow crystals
Melting point	300 °C (572 °F; 573 K)

Hazards
- GHS labelling
Pictograms	(GHS06: Toxic) (GHS09: Environmental hazard)
Signal word	Danger
Hazard statements	H301, H331, H410
Precautionary statements	P261, P264, P270, P271, P273, P301+P310, P304+P340, P311, P321, P330, P391, P403+P233, P405, P501
NFPA 704 (fire diamond)	3 0 0
- Except where otherwise noted, data are given for materials in their standard state (at 25 °C [77 °F], 100 kPa). verify (what is ?) Infobox references

Thorin (also called thoron or thoronol) is an organoarsenic compound. It can be used as an indicator in the determination of barium, beryllium, lithium, uranium and thorium compounds. Being a compound of arsenic, it is highly toxic.
