= Methylarsonic acid =

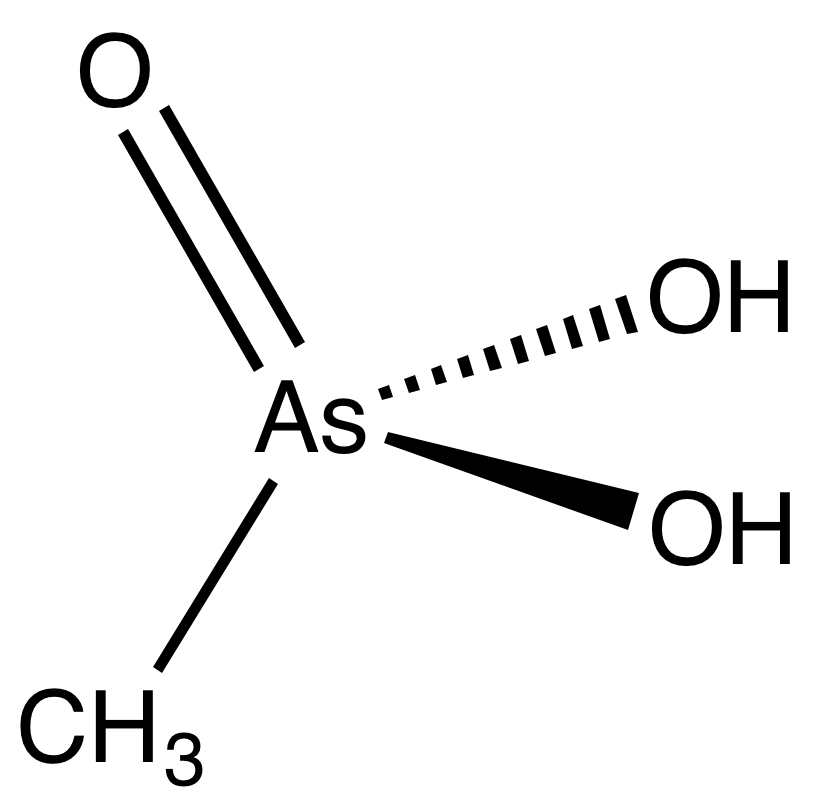

Names
- Preferred IUPAC name Methylarsonic acid
- Other names Methanearsonic acid Monomethylarsonic acid

Identifiers
| CAS Number | 124-58-3 |
| 3D model (JSmol) | Interactive image |
| Beilstein Reference | 4-04-00-03682 |
| ChemSpider | 8604 |
| ECHA InfoCard | 100.004.278 |
| EC Number | 204-705-6 |
| PubChem CID | 8948 |
| RTECS number | PA1575000 |
| UNII | J37VJ5709S |
| UN number | 1557 |
| CompTox Dashboard (EPA) | DTXSID4020903 |
- InChI: InChI=1S/CH5AsO3/c1-2(3,4)5/h1H3,(H2,3,4,5) Key: QYPPRTNMGCREIM-UHFFFAOYSA-N
- SMILES: C[As](=O)(O)O

Properties
| Chemical formula | CH_{5}AsO_{3} |
| Molar mass | 139.970 g·mol^{−1} |
| Appearance | white solid |
| Melting point | 160.5 °C (320.9 °F; 433.6 K) |
- Except where otherwise noted, data are given for materials in their standard state (at 25 °C [77 °F], 100 kPa). Infobox references

Methylarsonic acid is an organoarsenic compound with the formula CH_{3}AsO_{3}H_{2}. It is a colorless, water-soluble solid. Salts of this compound, e.g. disodium methyl arsonate (DSMA), have been widely used as herbicides and fungicides for cotton and rice.

== Reactions ==
At physiological pH, methylarsonic acid exists mainly as the monoanion CH_{3}AsO_{3}H^{−}; the dianion CH_{3}AsO^{2−}_{3} predominates above about pH 9.

== Synthesis and biosynthesis ==
Reaction of sodium arsenite with methyl iodide gives methylarsonic acid. This historically significant conversion is called the Meyer reaction:

NaAsO(OH)_{2} + CH_{3}I → CH_{3}AsO(OH)_{2} + NaI

The then-novel aspect of the reaction was that alkylation occurs at arsenic, leading to oxidation of arsenic from oxidation state +3 to +5.

The biomethylation of inorganic trivalent arsenic is thought to begin with its conversion to methylarsonate, with S-adenosylmethionine as the methyl donor. Methylarsonates are the precursors to cacodylates by reduction (to methylarsonous acid) followed by a second methylation.

== Safety ==
Methylarsonic acid is much less toxic than inorganic arsenic, but its metabolite methylarsonous acid is highly toxic.
