= Carbarsone =

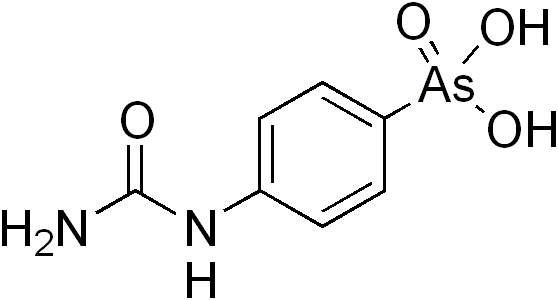

Names
- Preferred IUPAC name [4-(Carbamoylamino)phenyl]arsonic acid
- Other names (4-Ureidophenyl)arsonic acid

Identifiers
CAS Number	121-59-5
3D model (JSmol)	Interactive image; Interactive image
ChEMBL	ChEMBL1331366
ChemSpider	8167
ECHA InfoCard	100.004.077
EC Number	204-484-6
MeSH	Carbarson
PubChem CID	8480
UNII	8PK70TXE1T
CompTox Dashboard (EPA)	DTXSID4020246
- InChI: InChI=1S/C7H9AsN2O4/c9-7(11)10-6-3-1-5(2-4-6)8(12,13)14/h1-4H,(H3,9,10,11)(H2,12,13,14) Key: WWXBHTZSYYGCSG-UHFFFAOYSA-N; InChI=1/C7H9AsN2O4/c9-7(11)10-6-3-1-5(2-4-6)8(12,13)14/h1-4H,(H3,9,10,11)(H2,12,13,14) Key: WWXBHTZSYYGCSG-UHFFFAOYAW
- SMILES: O=C(Nc1ccc(cc1)[As](=O)(O)O)N; NC(=O)NC1=CC=C(C=C1)[As](O)(O)=O

Properties
Chemical formula	C_{7}H_{9}AsN_{2}O_{4}
Molar mass	260.081 g·mol^{−1}

Pharmacology
Routes of administration	Oral
- Except where otherwise noted, data are given for materials in their standard state (at 25 °C [77 °F], 100 kPa). verify (what is ?) Infobox references

Carbarsone is an organoarsenic compound used as an antiprotozoal drug for treatment of amebiasis and other infections. It was available for amebiasis in the United States as late as 1991. Thereafter, it remained available as a turkey feed additive for increasing weight gain and controlling histomoniasis (blackhead disease).

Carbarsone is one of four arsenical animal drugs approved by the U.S. Food and Drug Administration for use in poultry and/or swine, along with nitarsone, arsanilic acid, and roxarsone. In September 2013, the FDA announced that Zoetis and Fleming Laboratories would voluntarily withdraw current roxarsone, arsanilic acid, and carbarsone approvals, leaving only nitarsone approvals in place. In 2015 FDA withdrew the approval of using nitarsone in animal feeds. The ban came into effect at the end of 2015.
