= Nitarsone =

Names
- Preferred IUPAC name (4-Nitrophenyl)arsonic acid
- Other names (p-Nitrophenyl)arsonic acid; 4-Nitrobenzenearsonic acid

Identifiers
CAS Number	98-72-6
3D model (JSmol)	Interactive image
ChemSpider	60190
ECHA InfoCard	100.002.451
PubChem CID	66826
UNII	JP2EN8WORU
CompTox Dashboard (EPA)	DTXSID9045007
- InChI: InChI=1S/C6H6AsNO5/c9-7(10,11)5-1-3-6(4-2-5)8(12)13/h1-4H,(H2,9,10,11) Key: FUUFQLXAIUOWML-UHFFFAOYSA-N; InChI=1/C6H6AsNO5/c9-7(10,11)5-1-3-6(4-2-5)8(12)13/h1-4H,(H2,9,10,11) Key: FUUFQLXAIUOWML-UHFFFAOYAA
- SMILES: O=[N+]([O-])c1ccc(cc1)[As](=O)(O)O

Properties
Chemical formula	C_{6}H_{6}AsNO_{5}
Molar mass	247.038 g·mol^{−1}
Melting point	298–300 °C (568–572 °F; 571–573 K) (decomposes)
- Except where otherwise noted, data are given for materials in their standard state (at 25 °C [77 °F], 100 kPa). Infobox references

Nitarsone is an organoarsenic compound that is used in poultry production as a feed additive to increase weight gain, improve feed efficiency, and prevent histomoniasis (blackhead disease). It is marketed as Histostat by Zoetis.

Nitarsone once was one of four arsenical food-animal drugs—along with roxarsone, arsanilic acid, and carbarsone—approved by the U.S. Food and Drug Administration for use in feeding poultry. However, following the suspension of sales of roxarsone in the United States in 2011, nitarsone was thought to be the only arsenical animal drug actually marketed in the U.S. In September 2013, the FDA announced that Zoetis and Fleming Laboratories agreed to voluntarily withdraw from using roxarsone, arsanilic acid, and carbarsone, which left nitarsone as the only arsenical approved in the U.S. for use in food animals. But in 2015, the FDA also withdrew approval of nitarsone in animal feeds, effective at the end of 2015.
