= Roxarsone =

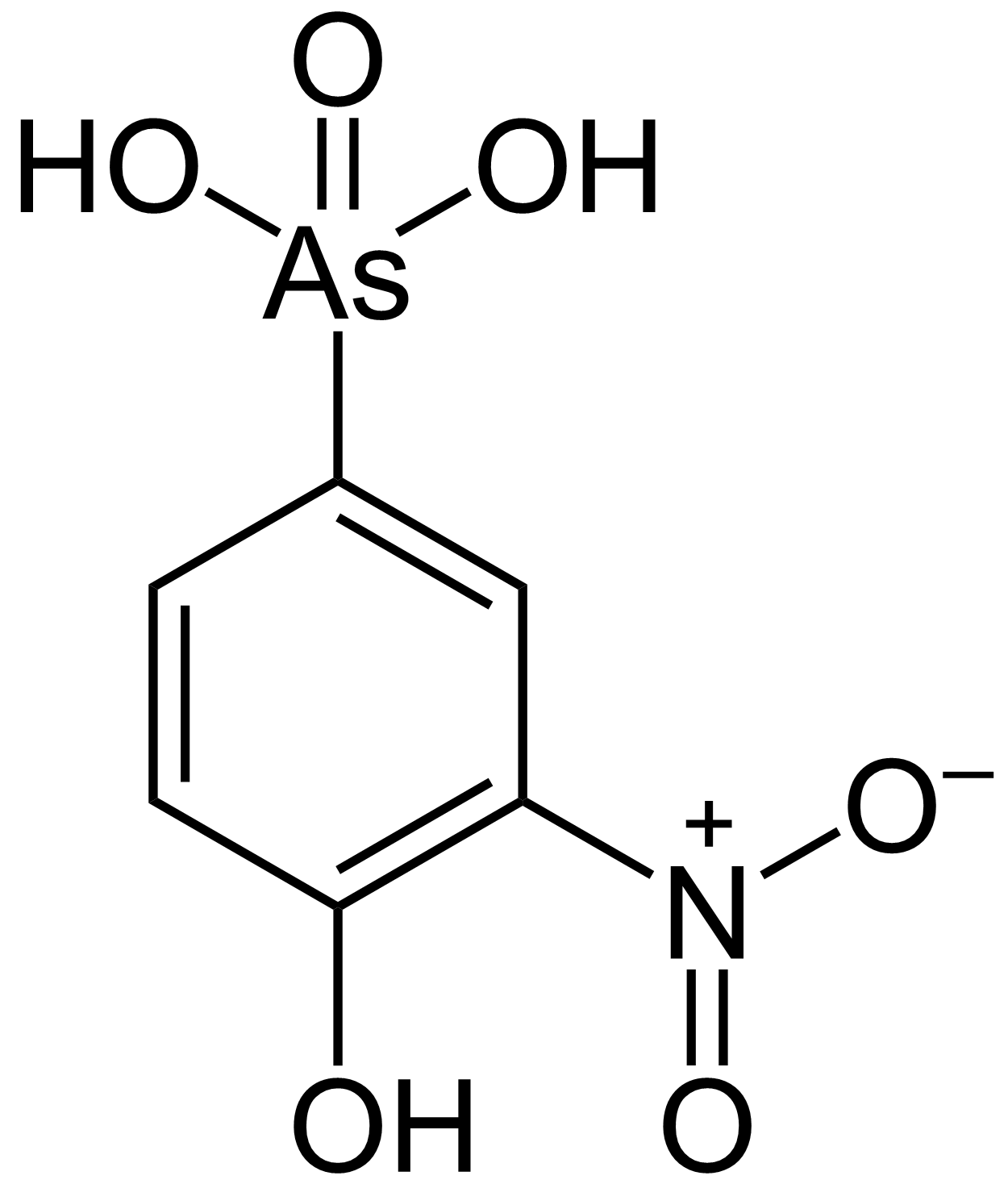

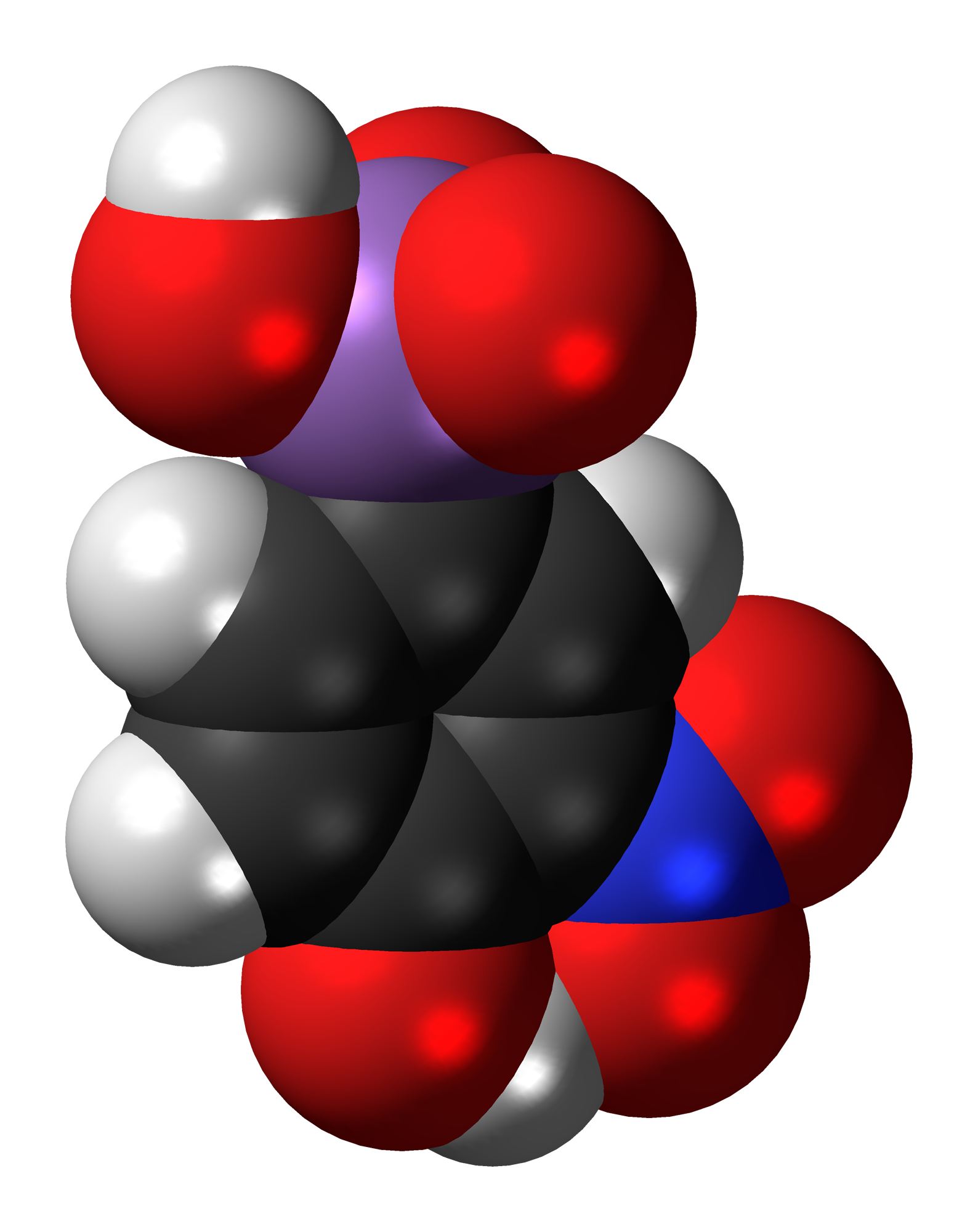

Names
- Preferred IUPAC name (4-Hydroxy-3-nitrophenyl)arsonic acid

Identifiers
CAS Number	121-19-7
3D model (JSmol)	Interactive image; Interactive image
Beilstein Reference	1976533
ChEBI	CHEBI:35817
ChEMBL	ChEMBL1321154
ChemSpider	4925
ECHA InfoCard	100.004.049
EC Number	204-453-7
Gmelin Reference	1221211
KEGG	D05771
MeSH	Roxarsone
PubChem CID	5104
RTECS number	CY5250000
UNII	H5GU9YQL7L
UN number	3465
CompTox Dashboard (EPA)	DTXSID9020956
- InChI: InChI=1S/C6H6AsNO6/c9-6-2-1-4(7(10,11)12)3-5(6)8(13)14/h1-3,9H,(H2,10,11,12) Key: XMVJITFPVVRMHC-UHFFFAOYSA-N; InChI=1/C6H6AsNO6/c9-6-2-1-4(7(10,11)12)3-5(6)8(13)14/h1-3,9H,(H2,10,11,12) Key: XMVJITFPVVRMHC-UHFFFAOYAF
- SMILES: Oc1ccc(cc1[N+](=O)[O-])[As](O)(O)=O; OC1=CC=C(C=C1[N+]([O-])=O)[As](O)(O)=O

Properties
Chemical formula	C_{6}AsNH_{6}O_{6}
Molar mass	263.0365 g mol^{−1}
Melting point	> 300 °C (572 °F; 573 K)

Hazards
- GHS labelling
Pictograms	(GHS06: Toxic) (GHS09: Environmental hazard)
Signal word	Danger
Hazard statements	H301, H331, H410
Precautionary statements	P261, P273, P301+P310, P311, P501
- Except where otherwise noted, data are given for materials in their standard state (at 25 °C [77 °F], 100 kPa). verify (what is ?) Infobox references

Roxarsone is an organoarsenic compound that has been used in poultry production and to a lesser extent in pig production as a feed additive to increase weight gain, for greater feed efficiency, to improve pigmentation, and as a coccidiostat. Until June 2011, it was approved for use in the United States, Canada, Australia, and 12 other countries. It is no longer approved for use in most jurisdictions.

Roxarsone has been banned in the European Union since 1999. Its use in the United States was voluntarily ended by the manufacturers in June 2011, and it has been illegal since 2013. Its use was suspended in Malaysia in June 2011. It was banned in Canada in August 2011. In Australia, its use was discontinued in 2012.

== Production and applications ==
Roxarsone is a derivative of phenylarsonic acid (C_{6}H_{5}As(O)(OH)_{2}). It was first reported in a 1923 British patent that described the nitration and diazotization of arsanilic acid. When blended with calcite powder, it is used in poultry feed premixes in some parts of the world. Where available, it can be purchased in 5%, 20% and 50% concentrations.

Roxarsone was marketed as 3-Nitro by Zoetis, a former subsidiary of Pfizer now a publicly traded company. In 2006, approximately one million kilograms of roxarsone were produced in the U.S.

== Marketing approval in the United States ==
Roxarsone is one of four arsenical animal drugs that had been approved by the U.S. Food and Drug Administration (FDA) for use in poultry and swine, along with nitarsone, arsanilic acid, and carbarsone. In September 2013, the FDA announced that Zoetis and Fleming Laboratories would voluntarily withdraw current roxarsone, arsanilic acid, and carbarsone approvals, leaving only nitarsone approvals in place. In 2015, the FDA withdrew the approval of using nitarsone in animal feeds. The ban came into effect at the end of 2015.

== Controversy ==
Roxarsone has attracted attention as a source of arsenic contamination of poultry and other foods. In June 2011, the manufacturers suspended sales of roxarsone in the U.S. and Canada in response to a study by the Food and Drug Administration (FDA) that found that roxarsone use was associated with elevated levels of inorganic arsenic in chicken livers. An FDA press release stated that the findings raised "concerns of a very low but completely avoidable exposure to a carcinogen."

A 2013 market basket study conducted in the United States linked the use of roxarsone and other arsenical feed additives to increased levels of inorganic arsenic in chicken breast meat. The study was performed on chickens raised prior to the voluntary withdrawal of roxarsone from the market by its manufacturer. Breast meat from chickens exposed to arsenical feed additives contained inorganic arsenic at the level of about two parts per billion. Breast meat from chickens raised in farms with a policy not to use arsenical feed additives contained inorganic arsenic at the level of 0.7 parts per billion. Organic chickens are not exposed to arsenical feed additives and contained about half a part per billion.

Federal standards at the time permitted concentrations of 500 parts per billion of total arsenic, but were established before 1963 and did not differentiate between organic arsenic and its highly toxic inorganic variety. In February 2011 the FDA's Center for Veterinary Medicine recommended inorganic arsenic in chicken not exceed 1 part per billion, then revised the statement to remove language suggesting a safe concentration, noting: "any new animal drug that contributes to the overall inorganic arsenic burden is of potential concern."
