= Arsenic acid =

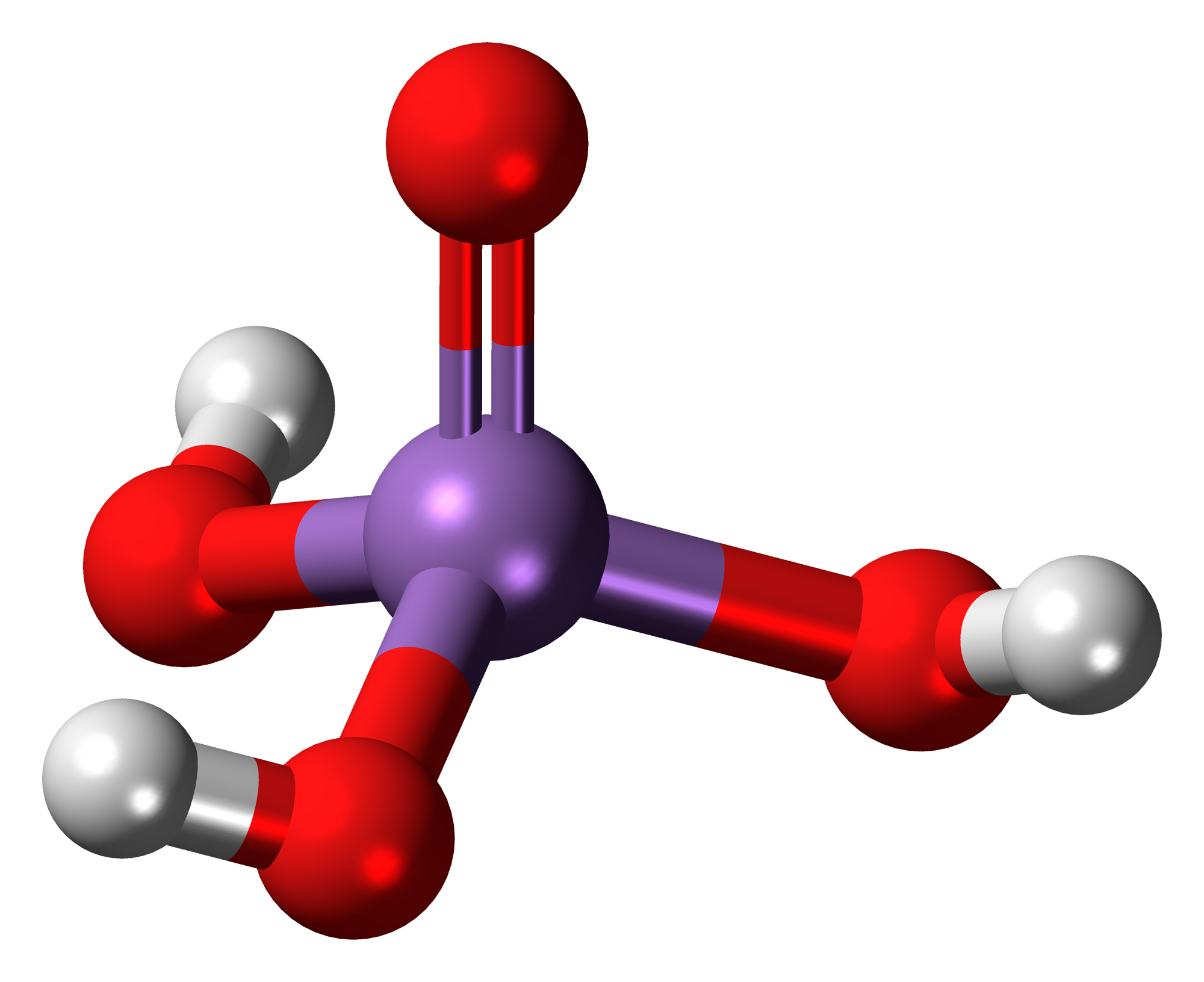

Names
- IUPAC name Arsoric acid
- Other names: Desiccant L-10; Orthoarsenic acid; Trihydrogen arsenate; Zotox

Identifiers
| CAS Number | 7778-39-4 |
| 3D model (JSmol) | Interactive image |
| ChEBI | CHEBI:18231 |
| ChEMBL | ChEMBL2374288 |
| ChemSpider | 229 |
| ECHA InfoCard | 100.029.001 |
| EC Number | 231-901-9 |
| KEGG | C01478 |
| PubChem CID | 234 |
| RTECS number | CG0700000 |
| UNII | N7CIZ75ZPN |
| UN number | 1553, 1554 |
| CompTox Dashboard (EPA) | DTXSID1034341 |
- InChI: InChI=1S/AsH3O4/c2-1(3,4)5/h(H3,2,3,4,5) Key: DJHGAFSJWGLOIV-UHFFFAOYSA-N; InChI=1/AsH3O4/c2-1(3,4)5/h(H3,2,3,4,5) Key: DJHGAFSJWGLOIV-UHFFFAOYAY
- SMILES: O[As+](O)([O-])O

Properties
| Chemical formula | H_{3}AsO_{4} |
| Molar mass | 141.942 g·mol^{−1} |
| Appearance | White translucent or colorless crystals, hygroscopic |
| Density | 2.5 g/cm^{3} |
| Melting point | 35.5 °C (95.9 °F; 308.6 K) |
| Boiling point | 120 °C (248 °F; 393 K) decomposes |
| Solubility in water | 16.7 g/(100 mL) |
| Solubility | soluble in ethanol |
| Vapor pressure | 55 hPa (50 °C) |
| Acidity (pK_{a}) | pK_{a1} = 2.19 pK_{a2} = 6.94 pK_{a3} = 11.5 |
| Conjugate base | Arsenate |

Structure
| Molecular shape | Tetrahedral at arsenic atom |

Hazards
- Occupational safety and health (OHS/OSH)
| Main hazards | Extremely toxic, carcinogenic, corrosive |
- GHS labelling
| Pictograms | (GHS05: Corrosive) (GHS06: Toxic) (GHS07: Exclamation mark) (GHS08: Health hazard) (GHS09: Environmental hazard) |
| Signal word | Danger |
| Hazard statements | H301, H312, H314, H331, H350, H361, H410 |
| Precautionary statements | P201, P202, P260, P264, P270, P271, P273, P280, P281, P301+P310, P301+P330+P331, P302+P352, P303+P361+P353, P304+P340, P305+P351+P338, P308+P313, P310, P311, P312, P321, P322, P330, P363, P391, P403+P233, P405, P501 |
| NFPA 704 (fire diamond) | 4 0 0 |
| Flash point | Non-flammable |
- Lethal dose or concentration (LD, LC)
| LD_{50} (median dose) | 48 mg/kg (rat, oral) 6 mg/kg (rabbit, oral) |

Related compounds
| Other cations | Sodium arsenate |
| Related compounds | Arsenous acid; Arsenic pentoxide; Phosphoric acid |
- Except where otherwise noted, data are given for materials in their standard state (at 25 °C [77 °F], 100 kPa). verify (what is ?) Infobox references

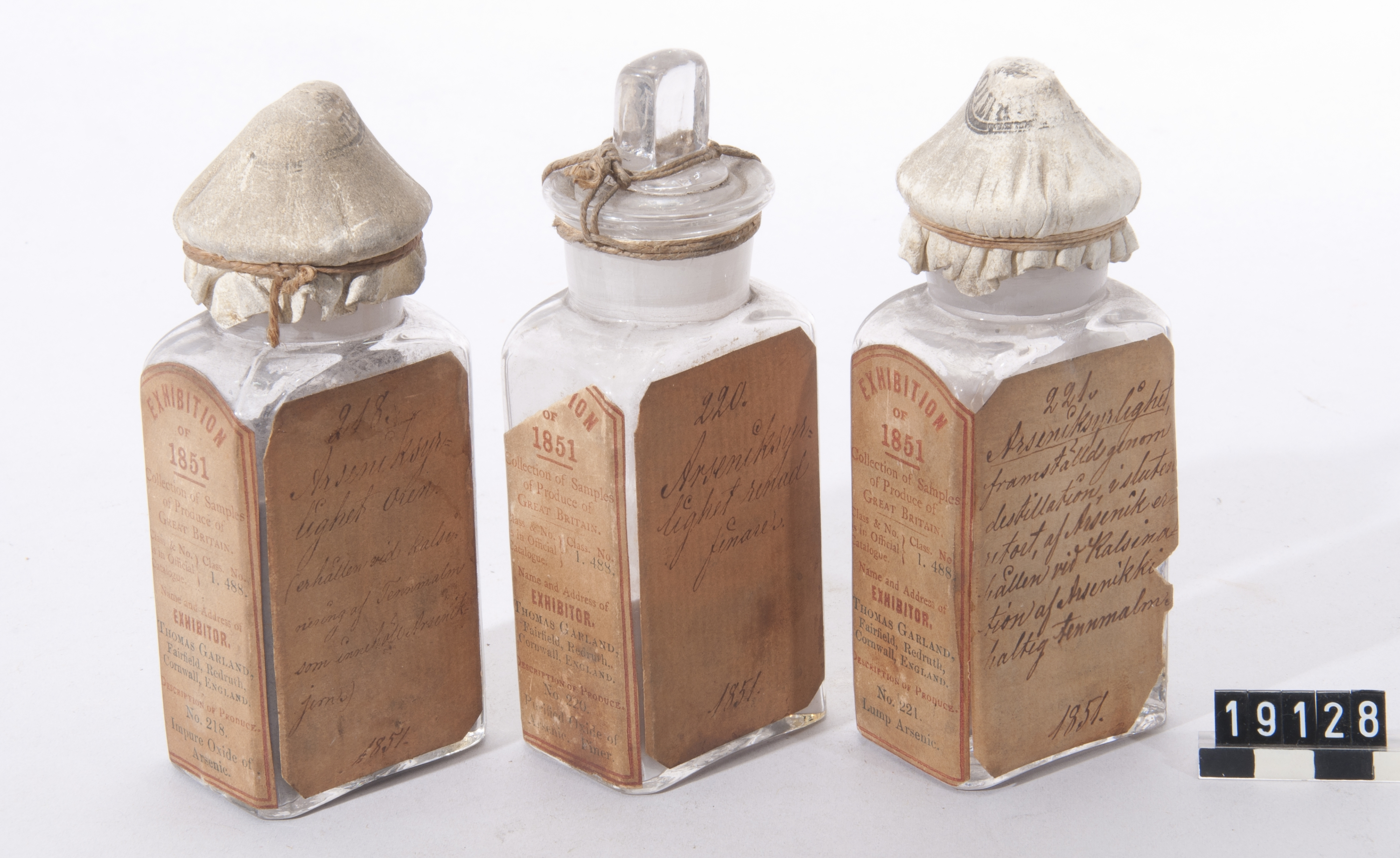
Three bottles of arsenic acid from the Great Exhibition: impure, pure and distilled.

Arsenic acid or arsoric acid is the chemical compound with the formula H_{3}AsO_{4}, more descriptively written as AsO(OH)_{3}. This colorless acid is the arsenic analogue of phosphoric acid. Arsenate and phosphate salts behave very similarly. Arsenic acid as such has not been isolated, but is only found in solution, where it is largely ionized. Its hemihydrate form (2H_{3}AsO_{4}·H_{2}O) does form stable crystals. Crystalline samples dehydrate with condensation at 100 °C.

== Properties ==
It is a tetrahedral species of idealized symmetry C_{3v} with As–O bond lengths ranging from 1.66 to 1.71 Å.

Being a triprotic acid, its acidity is described by three equilibria:

H_{3}AsO_{4} + H_{2}O ⇌ H_{2}AsO^{−}_{4} + [H_{3}O]^{+}, pK_{a1} = 2.19
H_{2}AsO^{−}_{4} + H_{2}O ⇌ HAsO^{2−}_{4} + [H_{3}O]^{+}, pK_{a2} = 6.94
HAsO^{2−}_{4} + H_{2}O ⇌ AsO^{3−}_{4} + [H_{3}O]^{+}, pK_{a3} = 11.5

These pK_{a} values are close to those for phosphoric acid. The highly basic arsenate ion (AsO^{3−}_{4}) is the product of the third ionization. Unlike phosphoric acid, arsenic acid is an oxidizer, as illustrated by its ability to convert iodide to iodine.

== Preparation ==
Arsenic acid is prepared by treating arsenic trioxide with concentrated nitric acid. Dinitrogen trioxide is produced as a by-product.

As_{2}O_{3} + 2 HNO_{3} + 2 H_{2}O → 2 H_{3}AsO_{4} + N_{2}O_{3}

The resulting solution is cooled to give colourless crystals of the hemihydrate H_{3}AsO_{4}·0.5H_{2}O (or 2H_{3}AsO_{4}·H_{2}O), although the dihydrate H_{3}AsO_{4}·2H_{2}O is produced when crystallisation occurs at lower temperatures.

=== Other methods ===
Arsenic acid is slowly formed when arsenic pentoxide is dissolved in water, and when meta- or pyroarsenic acid (H_{4}As_{2}O_{7}) is treated with cold water. Arsenic acid can also be prepared directly from elemental arsenic by moistening it and treating with ozone.

2 As + 3 H_{2}O + 5 O_{3} → 2 H_{3}AsO_{4} + 5 O_{2}

== Applications ==
Commercial applications of arsenic acid are limited by its toxicity. It is a precursor to a variety of pesticides. It has found occasional use as a wood preservative, a broad-spectrum biocide, a finishing agent for glass and metal, and a reagent in the synthesis of some dyestuffs and organic arsenic compounds.

== Safety ==
Arsenic acid is extremely toxic and carcinogenic, like all arsenic compounds. It is also corrosive. The LD_{50} in rabbits is 6 mg/kg (0.006 g/kg).
