= Arsenic =

Arsenic, _{33}As
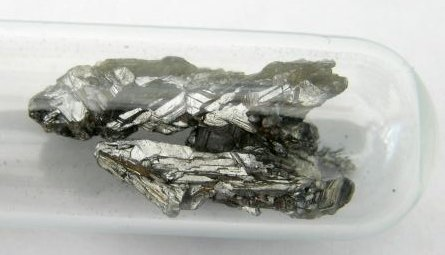

Arsenic
- Pronunciation: /ˈɑːrsənɪk/ (AR-sən-ik); as an adjective: /ɑːrˈsɛnɪk/ (ar-SEN-ik)
- Allotropes: grey (most common), yellow, black (see Allotropes of arsenic)
- Appearance: metallic grey

Standard atomic weight A_{r}°(As)
- 74.921595±0.000006; 74.922±0.001 (abridged)

Arsenic in the periodic table
Hydrogen																															Helium
Lithium	Beryllium																									Boron	Carbon	Nitrogen	Oxygen	Fluorine	Neon
Sodium	Magnesium																									Aluminium	Silicon	Phosphorus	Sulfur	Chlorine	Argon
Potassium	Calcium															Scandium	Titanium	Vanadium	Chromium	Manganese	Iron	Cobalt	Nickel	Copper	Zinc	Gallium	Germanium	Arsenic	Selenium	Bromine	Krypton
Rubidium	Strontium															Yttrium	Zirconium	Niobium	Molybdenum	Technetium	Ruthenium	Rhodium	Palladium	Silver	Cadmium	Indium	Tin	Antimony	Tellurium	Iodine	Xenon
Caesium	Barium	Lanthanum	Cerium	Praseodymium	Neodymium	Promethium	Samarium	Europium	Gadolinium	Terbium	Dysprosium	Holmium	Erbium	Thulium	Ytterbium	Lutetium	Hafnium	Tantalum	Tungsten	Rhenium	Osmium	Iridium	Platinum	Gold	Mercury (element)	Thallium	Lead	Bismuth	Polonium	Astatine	Radon
Francium	Radium	Actinium	Thorium	Protactinium	Uranium	Neptunium	Plutonium	Americium	Curium	Berkelium	Californium	Einsteinium	Fermium	Mendelevium	Nobelium	Lawrencium	Rutherfordium	Dubnium	Seaborgium	Bohrium	Hassium	Meitnerium	Darmstadtium	Roentgenium	Copernicium	Nihonium	Flerovium	Moscovium	Livermorium	Tennessine	Oganesson
P
↑
As
↓
Sb
germanium ← arsenic → selenium
- Atomic number (Z): 33
- Group: group 15 (pnictogens)
- Period: period 4
- Block: p-block
- Electron configuration: [Ar] 3d^{10} 4s^{2} 4p^{3}
- Electrons per shell: 2, 8, 18, 5

Physical properties
- Phase at STP: solid
- Sublimation point: 887 K (615 °C, 1137 °F)
- Density (at 20° C): grey: 5.782 g/cm^{3}
- when liquid (at m.p.): 5.22 g/cm^{3}
- Triple point: 1090 K, 3628 kPa
- Critical point: 1673 K, ? MPa
- Heat of fusion: grey: 24.44 kJ/mol
- Heat of vaporization: 34.76 kJ/mol (?)
- Molar heat capacity: 24.64 J/(mol·K)
- Specific heat capacity: 328.875 J/(kg·K)
Vapor pressure
P (Pa)	1	10	100	1 k	10 k	100 k
at T (K)	553	596	646	706	781	874

Atomic properties
- Oxidation states: common: −3, +3, +5 −2, −1, 0, +1, +2, +4
- Electronegativity: Pauling scale: 2.18
- Ionization energies: 1st: 947.0 kJ/mol; 2nd: 1798 kJ/mol; 3rd: 2735 kJ/mol; (more)
- Atomic radius: empirical: 119 pm
- Covalent radius: 119±4 pm
- Van der Waals radius: 185 pm
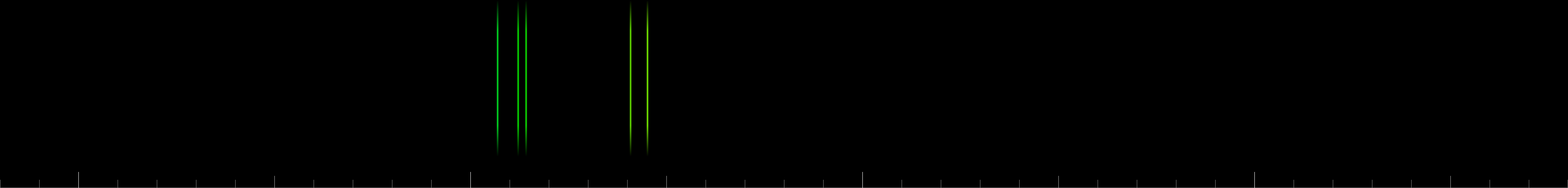
- Spectral lines of arsenic

Other properties
- Natural occurrence: primordial
- Crystal structure: grey: rhombohedral (hR2)
- Lattice constants: a_{r} = 413.15 pm α = 54.133° pm a_{h} = 375.99 pm c_{h} = 1054.58 pm (at 20 °C)
- Thermal expansion: 5.6 µm/(m⋅K) (at r.t.)
- Thermal conductivity: 50.2 W/(m⋅K)
- Electrical resistivity: 333 nΩ⋅m (at 20 °C)
- Magnetic ordering: diamagnetic
- Molar magnetic susceptibility: −5.5×10^{−6} cm^{3}/mol
- Young's modulus: 8 GPa
- Bulk modulus: 22 GPa
- Mohs hardness: 3.5
- Brinell hardness: 1440 MPa
- CAS Number: 7440-38-2

History
- Naming: from Arabic al-zarnīḵ الزرنيخ 'the orpiment'
- Discovery: Arabic alchemists (before AD 815)

Isotopes of arsenic
Main isotopes			Decay	
Isotope	abundance	half-life (t_{1/2})	mode	product
^{73}As	synth	80.30 d	ε	^{73}Ge
^{74}As	synth	17.77 d	β^{+}66%	^{74}Ge
^{74}As	synth	17.77 d	β^{−}34%	^{74}Se
^{75}As	100%	stable		

Arsenic is a chemical element; it has the symbol As and atomic number 33. It is a metalloid and one of the pnictogens, and therefore shares many properties with its group 15 neighbors phosphorus and antimony. Arsenic is notoriously toxic. It occurs naturally in many minerals, usually in combination with sulfur and metals, but also as a pure elemental crystal. It has various allotropes, but only the grey form, which has a metallic appearance, is important to industry.

The primary use of arsenic is in alloys of lead (for example, in car batteries and ammunition). Arsenic is also a common n-type dopant in semiconductor electronic devices, and a component of the III–V compound semiconductor gallium arsenide. Arsenic and its compounds, especially the trioxide, are used in the production of pesticides, treated wood products, herbicides, and insecticides. These applications are declining with the increasing recognition of the persistent toxicity of arsenic and its compounds.

Arsenic containing compounds have been known since ancient times to be poisonous to humans. However, a few species of bacteria are able to use arsenic compounds as respiratory metabolites. Trace quantities of arsenic have been proposed to be an essential dietary element in rats, hamsters, goats, and chickens. Research has not been conducted to determine whether small amounts of arsenic may play a role in human metabolism. However, arsenic poisoning occurs in multicellular life if quantities are larger than needed. Arsenic contamination of groundwater is a problem that affects millions of people across the world.

The United States' Environmental Protection Agency states that all forms of arsenic are a serious risk to human health. The United States Agency for Toxic Substances and Disease Registry ranked arsenic number 1 in its 2001 prioritized list of hazardous substances at Superfund sites. Arsenic is classified as a group 1 carcinogen.

== Characteristics ==
=== Physical characteristics ===
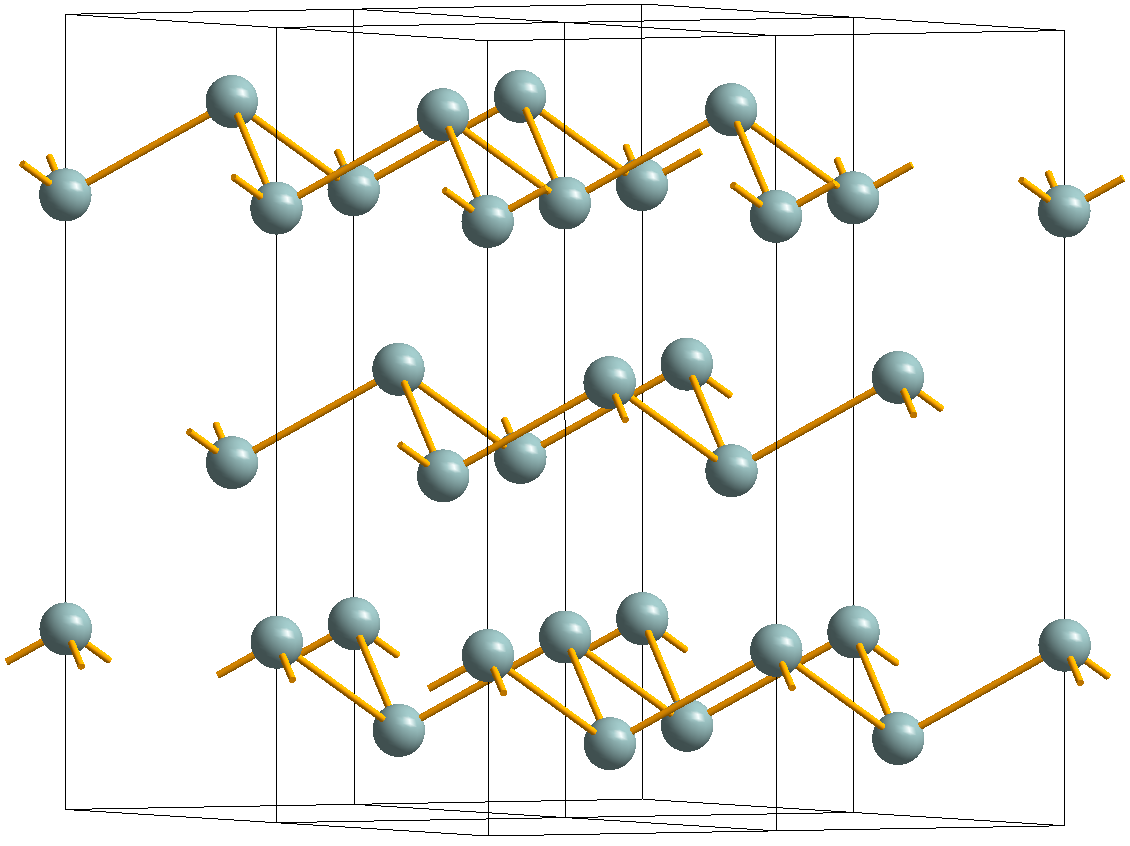
Crystal structure common to Sb, AsSb and grey As

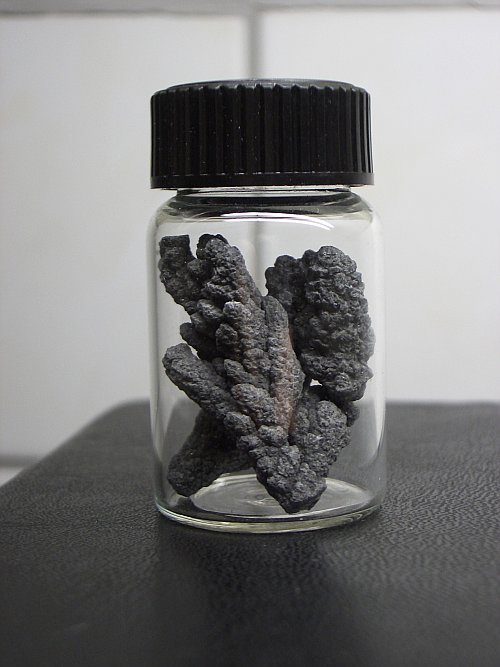
Gray arsenic nodule

The three most common arsenic allotropes are grey, yellow, and black arsenic, with grey being the most common. Grey arsenic (α-As, space group R3̅m No. 166) adopts a double-layered structure consisting of many interlocked, ruffled, six-membered rings. Because of weak bonding between the layers, grey arsenic is brittle and has a relatively low Mohs hardness of 3.5. Nearest and next-nearest neighbors form a distorted octahedral complex, with the three atoms in the same double-layer being slightly closer than the three atoms in the next. This relatively close packing leads to a high density of 5.73 g/cm^{3}. Grey arsenic is a semimetal, but becomes a semiconductor with a bandgap of 1.2–1.4 eV if amorphized. Grey arsenic is also the most stable form. Yellow arsenic is soft and waxy, and somewhat similar to tetraphosphorus (P_{4}). Both have four atoms arranged in a tetrahedral structure in which each atom is bound to each of the other three atoms by a single bond. This unstable allotrope, being molecular, is the most volatile, least dense, and most toxic. Solid yellow arsenic is produced by rapid cooling of arsenic vapor, As_{4}. It is rapidly transformed into grey arsenic by light. The yellow form has a density of 1.97 g/cm^{3}. Black arsenic is similar in structure to black phosphorus. Black arsenic can also be formed by cooling vapor at around 373–493 K (100–220 °C) and by crystallization of amorphous arsenic in the presence of mercury vapors. It is glassy and brittle. Black arsenic is also a poor electrical conductor.

Arsenic sublimes upon heating at atmospheric pressure, converting directly to a gaseous form without an intervening liquid state at 887 K (614 °C). However, at 1,090 K (817 °C) and 2.84 MPa, arsenic melts. The triple point is at 3.63 MPa and 1,090 K (817 °C).

=== Isotopes ===
Arsenic occurs naturally as a single stable isotope, ^{75}As. Synthetic radioisotopes are known from ^{64}As to ^{95}As, as well as at least 11 isomers.

The most stable of these are ^{73}As with a half-life of 80.30 days and ^{74}As with a half-life of 17.77 days, followed by ^{71}As (65.30 hours), ^{77}As (38.79 hours), ^{76}As (26.24 hours), and ^{72}As (26.0 hours). All others have half-lives under 100 minutes and most under one minute. Isotopes lighter than the stable one generally decay by positron emission or electron capture to germanium isotopes, while those heavier beta decay to selenium isotopes. A notable exception is that ^{74}As decays both ways.

=== Chemistry ===
Arsenic has a similar electronegativity and ionization energies to its lighter pnictogen congener phosphorus and therefore readily forms covalent molecules with most of the nonmetals. Though stable in dry air, arsenic forms a golden-bronze tarnish upon exposure to humidity which eventually becomes a black surface layer. When heated in air, arsenic oxidizes to arsenic trioxide; the fumes from this reaction have an odor resembling garlic. This odor can be detected on striking arsenide minerals such as arsenopyrite with a hammer. It burns in oxygen to form arsenic trioxide and arsenic pentoxide, which have the same structure as the more well-known phosphorus compounds, and in fluorine to give arsenic pentafluoride. Arsenic makes arsenic acid with concentrated nitric acid, arsenous acid with dilute nitric acid, and arsenic trioxide with concentrated sulfuric acid; however, it does not react with water, alkalis, or non-oxidising acids. Arsenic reacts with metals to form arsenides, though these are not ionic compounds containing the As^{3−} ion as the formation of such an anion would be highly endothermic and even the group 1 arsenides have properties of intermetallic compounds. Like germanium, selenium, and bromine, which like arsenic succeed the 3d transition series, arsenic is much less stable in the +5 oxidation state than its vertical neighbors phosphorus and antimony, and hence arsenic pentoxide and arsenic acid are potent oxidizers.

== Compounds ==
Compounds of arsenic resemble, in some respects, those of phosphorus, which occupies the same group (column) of the periodic table. The most common oxidation states for arsenic are: −3 in the arsenides, which are alloy-like intermetallic compounds, +3 in the arsenites, and +5 in the arsenates and most organoarsenic compounds. Arsenic also bonds readily to itself as seen in the square As_{4}^{3−} ions in the mineral skutterudite. In the +3 oxidation state, arsenic is typically pyramidal owing to the influence of the lone pair of electrons.

=== Inorganic compounds ===
One of the simplest arsenic compounds is the trihydride, the highly toxic, flammable, pyrophoric arsine (AsH_{3}). This compound is generally regarded as stable, since at room temperature it decomposes only slowly. At temperatures of 523–573 K (250–300 °C) decomposition to arsenic and hydrogen is rapid. Several factors, such as humidity, presence of light and certain catalysts (namely aluminium) facilitate the rate of decomposition. It oxidises readily in air to form arsenic trioxide and water, and analogous reactions take place with sulfur and selenium instead of oxygen.

Arsenic forms colorless, odorless, crystalline oxides As_{2}O_{3} ("white arsenic") and As_{2}O_{5} which are hygroscopic and readily soluble in water to form acidic solutions. Arsenic(V) acid is a weak acid and its salts, known as arsenates, are a major source of arsenic contamination of groundwater in regions with high levels of naturally occurring arsenic minerals. Synthetic arsenates include Scheele's Green (cupric hydrogen arsenate, acidic copper arsenate), calcium arsenate, and lead hydrogen arsenate. These three have been used as agricultural insecticides and poisons.

The protonation steps between the arsenate and arsenic acid are similar to those between phosphate and phosphoric acid. Unlike phosphorous acid, arsenous acid is genuinely tribasic, with the formula As(OH)_{3}.

A broad variety of sulfur compounds of arsenic are known. Orpiment (As_{2}S_{3}) and realgar (As_{4}S_{4}) are somewhat abundant and were formerly used as painting pigments. In As_{4}S_{10}, arsenic has a formal oxidation state of +2 in As_{4}S_{4} which features As-As bonds so that the total covalency of As is still 3. Both orpiment and realgar, as well as As_{4}S_{3}, have selenium analogs; the analogous As_{2}Te_{3} is known as the mineral kalgoorlieite, and the anion As_{2}Te^{−} is known as a ligand in cobalt complexes.

All trihalides of arsenic(III) are well known except the astatide, which is unknown. Arsenic pentafluoride (AsF_{5}) is the only important pentahalide, reflecting the lower stability of the +5 oxidation state; even so, it is a very strong fluorinating and oxidizing agent. (The pentachloride is a kind of yellow solid that is only stable below −50 °C, at which temperature it decomposes to the trichloride, releasing chlorine gas.)

==== Alloys ====
Arsenic is used as the group 5 element in the III-V semiconductors gallium arsenide, indium arsenide, and aluminium arsenide. The valence electron count of GaAs is the same as a pair of Si atoms, but the band structure is completely different which results in distinct bulk properties. Other arsenic alloys include the II-V semiconductor cadmium arsenide.

=== Organoarsenic compounds ===
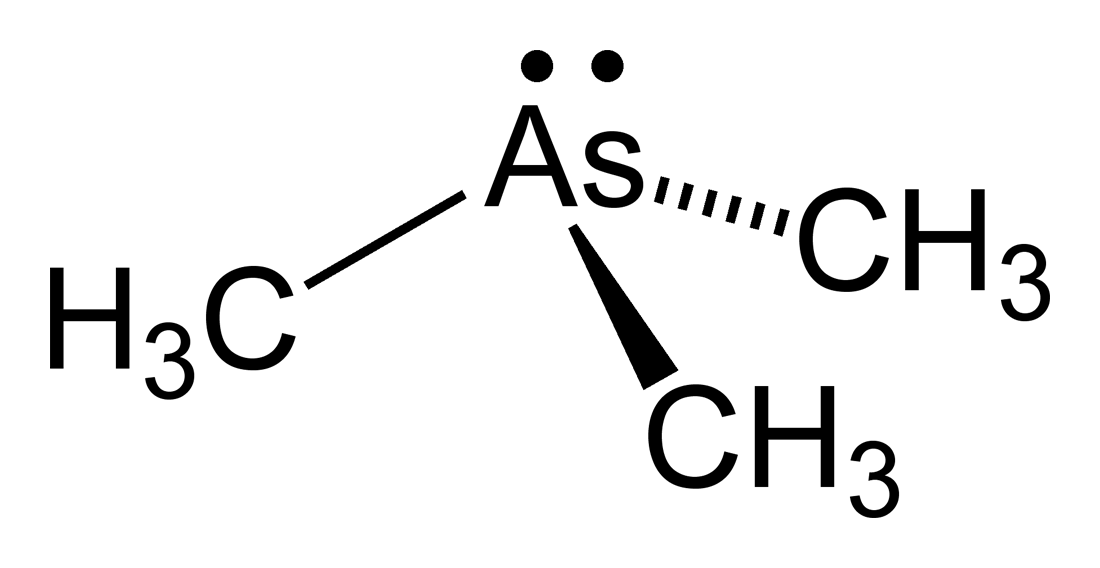
Trimethylarsine

A large variety of organoarsenic compounds are known. Several were developed as chemical warfare agents during World War I, including vesicants such as lewisite and vomiting agents such as adamsite. Cacodylic acid, which is of historic and practical interest, arises from the methylation of arsenic trioxide, a reaction that has no analogy in phosphorus chemistry. Cacodyl was the first organometallic compound known (even though arsenic is not a true metal) and was named from the Greek κακωδία "stink" for its offensive, garlic-like odor; it is very toxic.

== Occurrence and production ==
Arsenic production

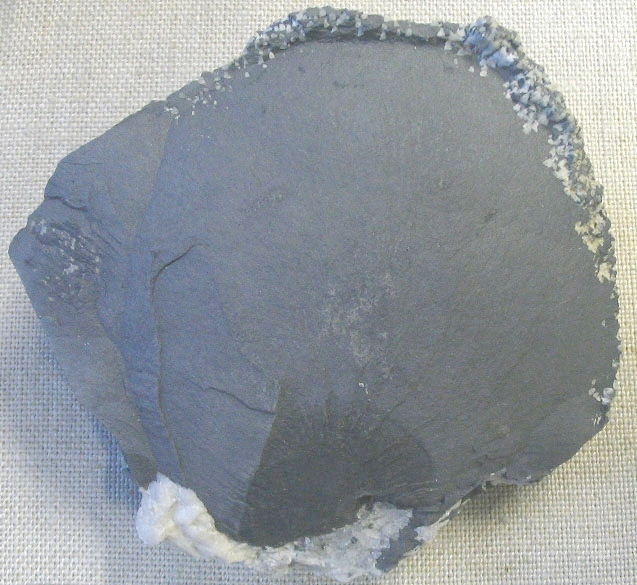
A large sample of native arsenic from Sainte-Marie-aux-Mines, France

Arsenic is the 53rd most abundant element in the Earth's crust, comprising about 1.5 parts per million (0.00015%). Typical background concentrations of arsenic do not exceed 3 ng/m^{3} in the atmosphere; 100 mg/kg in soil; 400 μg/kg in vegetation; 10 μg/L in freshwater and 1.5 μg/L in seawater. Arsenic is the 22nd most abundant element in seawater and ranks 41st in abundance in the universe.

Minerals with the formula MAsS and MAs_{2} (M = Fe, Ni, Co) are the dominant commercial sources of arsenic, together with realgar (an arsenic sulfide mineral) and native (elemental) arsenic. An illustrative mineral is arsenopyrite (FeAsS), which is structurally related to iron pyrite. Many minor As-containing minerals are known. Arsenic also occurs in various organic forms in the environment.

In 2015, Peru and China were the top producer of white arsenic with almost 89 % world share, according to the United States Geological Survey. Most arsenic refinement operations in the US and Europe have closed over environmental concerns. Arsenic is found in the smelter dust from copper, gold, and lead smelters, and is recovered primarily from copper refinement dust. Arsenic is the main impurity found in copper concentrates to enter copper smelting facilities. There has been an increase in arsenic in copper concentrates over the years since copper mining has moved into deep high-impurity ores as shallow, low-arsenic copper deposits have been progressively depleted.

On roasting arsenopyrite in air, arsenic sublimes as arsenic(III) oxide leaving iron oxides, while roasting without air results in the production of gray arsenic. Further purification from sulfur and other chalcogens is achieved by sublimation in vacuum, in a hydrogen atmosphere, or by distillation from molten lead-arsenic mixture.

Rank	Country	2025 As_{2}O_{3} Production
1	Peru	30,000 T
2	China	24,000 T
3	Morocco	5,000 T
4	Belgium	1,000 T
5	Russia	500 T
—	World Total (rounded)	61,000 T

== History ==
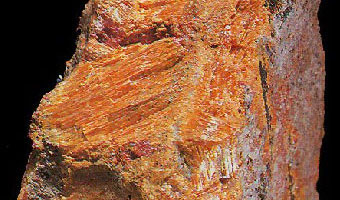
Realgar

Alchemical symbol for arsenic

The word arsenic has its origin in the Syriac word ܙܪܢܝܟܐ zarnika, from Arabic al-zarnīḵ الزرنيخ 'the orpiment', based on Persian zar ("gold") from the word زرنيخ zarnikh, meaning "yellow" (literally "gold-colored") and hence "(yellow) orpiment". It was adopted into Greek (using folk etymology) as arsenikon (ἀρσενικόν) – a neuter form of the Greek adjective arsenikos (ἀρσενικός), meaning "male", "virile".

Latin-speakers adopted the Greek term as arsenicum, which in French ultimately became arsenic, whence the English word "arsenic". Arsenic sulfides (orpiment, realgar) and oxides have been known and used since ancient times. Zosimos (c. 300 AD) describes roasting sandarach (realgar) to obtain cloud of arsenic (arsenic trioxide), which he then reduces to gray arsenic. As the symptoms of arsenic poisoning are not very specific, the substance was frequently used for murder until the advent in the 1830s of the Marsh test, a sensitive chemical test for its presence. (Another less sensitive but more general test is the Reinsch test.) Owing to its use by the ruling class to murder one another and its potency and discreetness, arsenic has been called the "poison of kings" and the "king of poisons". Arsenic became known as "the inheritance powder" due to its use in killing family members in the Renaissance era for a fortune.

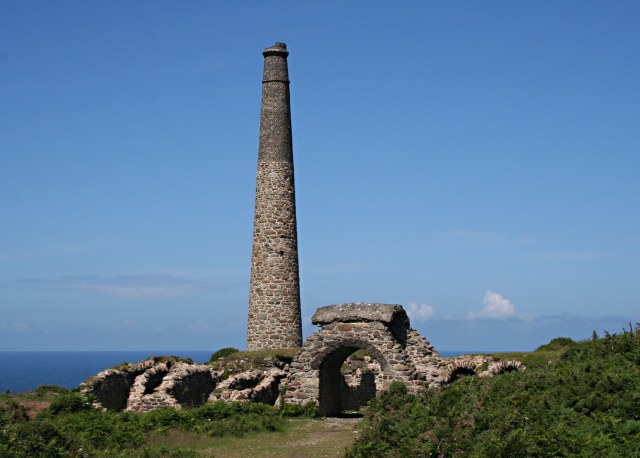
The arsenic labyrinth, part of Botallack Mine, Cornwall

During the Bronze Age, arsenic was melted with copper to make arsenical bronze. Jabir ibn Hayyan described the isolation of arsenic before 815 AD. (Note: "We find in his [ibn Hayyan's] writings [...] preparation of various substances (e.g., basic lead carbonatic, arsenic and antimony from their sulphides).) Albertus Magnus (Albert the Great, 1193–1280) later isolated the element from a compound in 1250, by heating soap together with arsenic trisulfide. In 1649, Johann Schröder published two ways of preparing arsenic. Crystals of elemental (native) arsenic are found in nature, although rarely.

Cadet's fuming liquid (impure cacodyl), often claimed as the first synthetic organometallic compound, was synthesized in 1760 by Louis Claude Cadet de Gassicourt through the reaction of potassium acetate with arsenic trioxide.

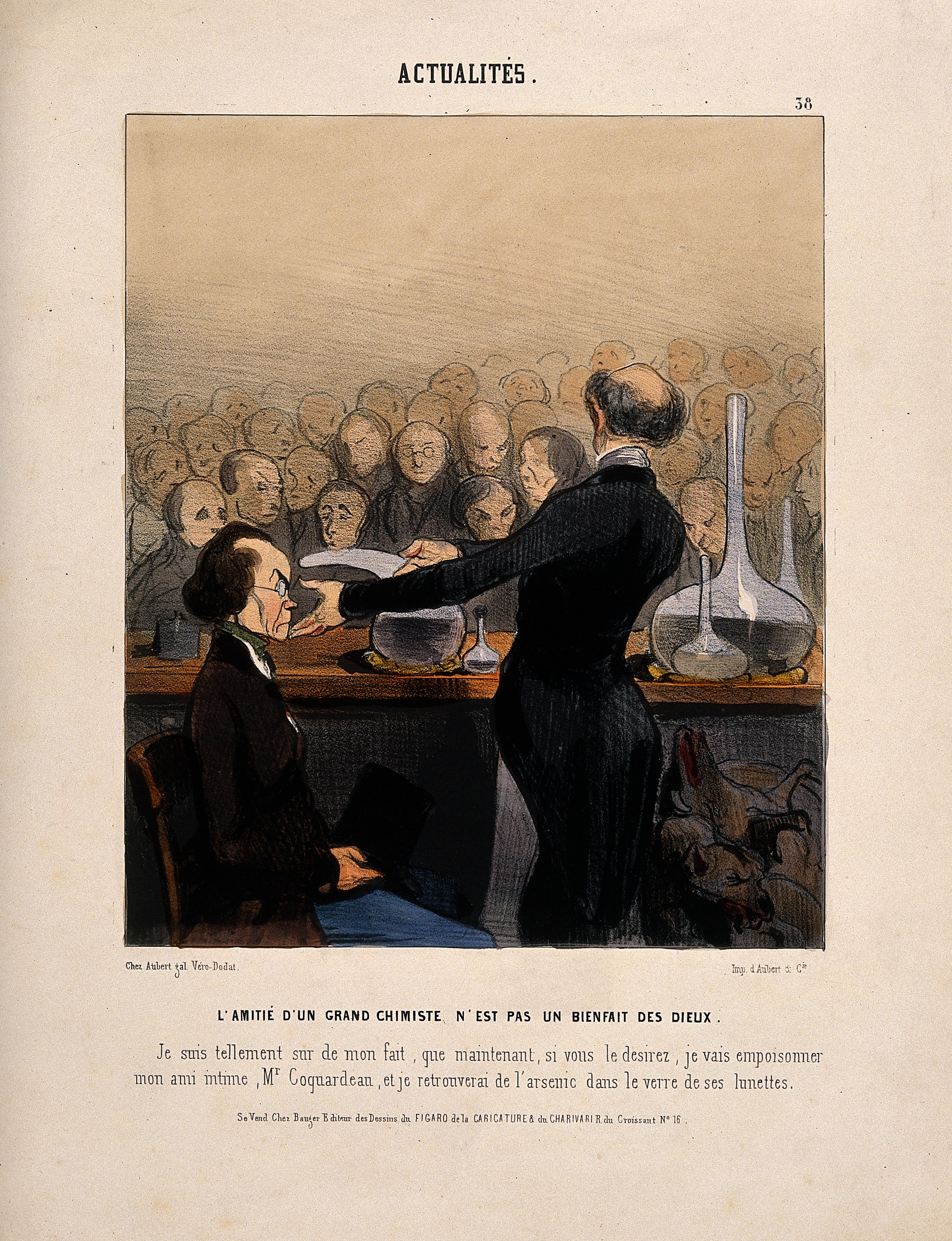
Satirical cartoon by Honoré Daumier of a chemist giving a public demonstration of arsenic, 1841

In the Victorian era, women would eat "arsenic" ("white arsenic" or arsenic trioxide) mixed with vinegar and chalk to improve the complexion of their faces, making their skin paler (to show they did not work in the fields). The accidental use of arsenic in the adulteration of foodstuffs led to the Bradford sweet poisoning in 1858, which resulted in 21 deaths. From the late 18th century wallpaper production began to use dyes made from arsenic, (Note: "At first, green papers were coloured with the traditional mineral pigment verdigris or buy mixing blues and yellows of plant origin. But once Scheele's green began to be produced in quantity, it was adopted as an improvement over the old colours and became a common constituent in wallpaper by 1800.") which was thought to increase the pigment's brightness. One account of the illness and 1821 death of Napoleon implicates arsenic poisoning involving wallpaper. (Note: "The wallpaper-as-arsenic-source of poison made the headlines in 1982 [...] when analysis of a sample of wallpaper from the living room in Longwood, Napoleon's residence on Saint Helena, revealed arsenic concentrations of about 0.12 g/m^{2}.")

Two arsenic pigments have been widely used since their discovery – Paris Green in 1814 and Scheele's Green in 1775. After the toxicity of arsenic became widely known, these chemicals were used less often as pigments and more often as insecticides. In the 1860s, an arsenic byproduct of dye production, London Purple, was widely used. This was a solid mixture of arsenic trioxide, aniline, lime, and ferrous oxide, insoluble in water and very toxic by inhalation or ingestion But it was later replaced with Paris Green, another arsenic-based dye. With better understanding of the toxicology mechanism, two other compounds were used starting in the 1890s. Arsenite of lime and arsenate of lead were used widely as insecticides until the discovery of DDT in 1942.

In small doses, soluble arsenic compounds act as stimulants, and were once popular as medicine by people in the mid-18th to 19th centuries; this use was especially prevalent for sport animals such as race horses or work dogs and continued into the 20th century. A 2006 study of the remains of the Australian racehorse Phar Lap determined that its 1932 death was caused by a massive overdose of arsenic. Sydney veterinarian Percy Sykes stated,

In those days, arsenic was quite a common tonic, usually given in the form of a solution (Fowler's Solution) ... It was so common that I'd reckon 90 per cent of the horses had arsenic in their system.

== Applications ==
=== Agricultural ===
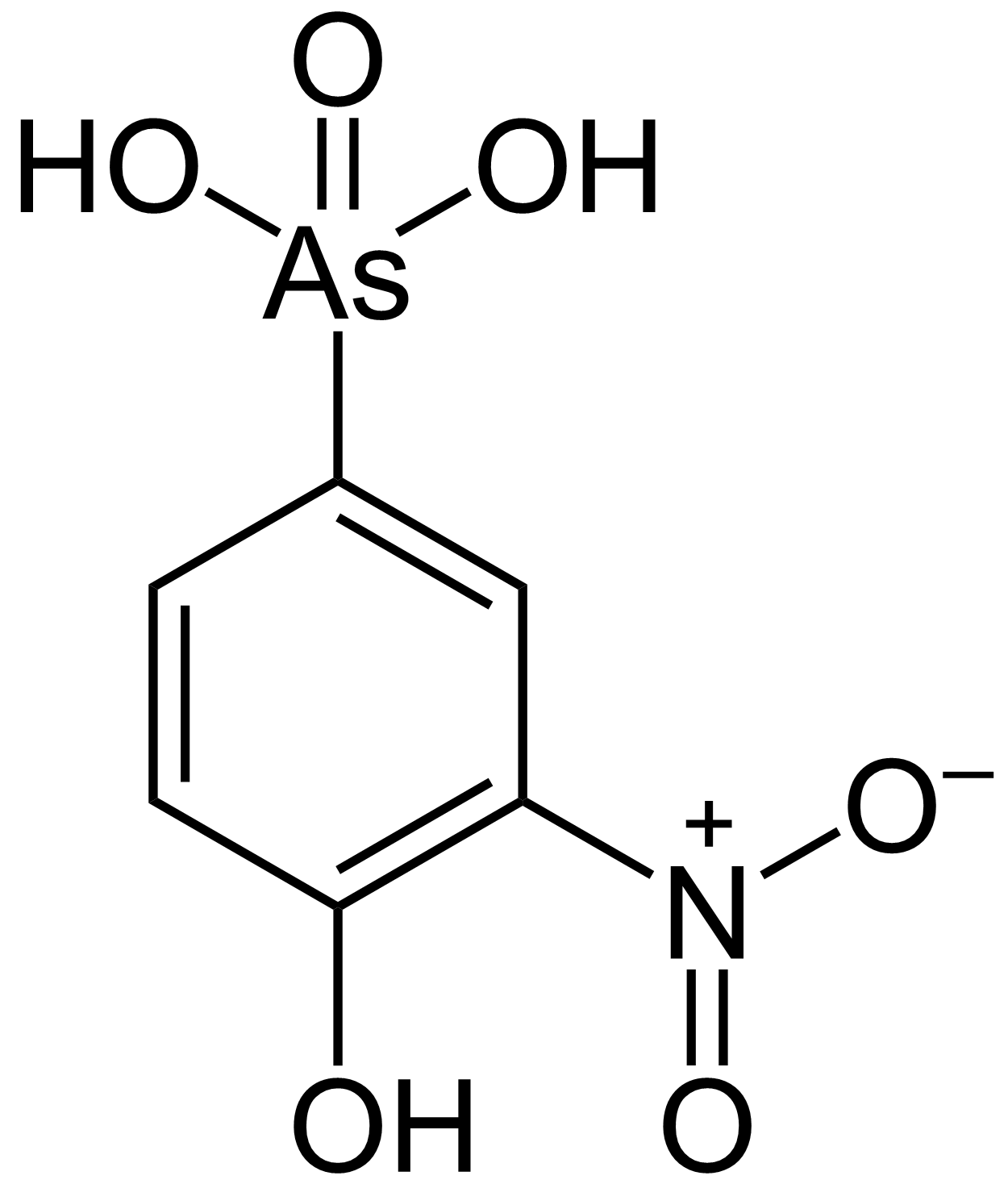
Roxarsone is a controversial arsenic compound used as a feed ingredient for chickens.

The toxicity of arsenic to insects, bacteria, and fungi led to its use as a wood preservative. In the 1930s, a process of treating wood with chromated copper arsenate (also known as CCA or Tanalith) was invented, and for decades, this treatment was the most extensive industrial use of arsenic. An increased appreciation of the toxicity of arsenic led to a ban of CCA in consumer products in 2004, initiated by the European Union and United States. However, CCA remains in heavy use in other countries (such as on Malaysian rubber plantations).

Arsenic was also used in various agricultural insecticides and poisons. For example, lead hydrogen arsenate was a common insecticide on fruit trees, but contact with the compound sometimes resulted in brain damage among those working the sprayers. In the second half of the 20th century, monosodium methyl arsenate (MSMA) and disodium methyl arsenate (DSMA) – less toxic organic forms of arsenic – replaced lead arsenate in agriculture. These organic arsenicals were in turn phased out in the United States by 2013 in all agricultural activities except cotton farming.

The biogeochemistry of arsenic is complex and includes various adsorption and desorption processes. The toxicity of arsenic is connected to its solubility and is affected by pH. Arsenite (AsO_{3}^{3−}) is more soluble than arsenate (AsO_{4}^{3−}) and is more toxic; however, at a lower pH, arsenate becomes more mobile and toxic. It was found that addition of sulfur, phosphorus, and iron oxides to high-arsenite soils greatly reduces arsenic phytotoxicity.

Arsenic is used as a feed additive in poultry and swine production, in particular it was used in the U.S. until 2015 to increase weight gain, improve feed efficiency, and prevent disease. An example is roxarsone, which had been used as a broiler starter by about 70% of U.S. broiler growers. In 2011, Alpharma, a subsidiary of Pfizer Inc., which produces roxarsone, voluntarily suspended sales of the drug in response to studies showing elevated levels of inorganic arsenic, a carcinogen, in treated chickens. A successor to Alpharma, Zoetis, continued to sell nitarsone until 2015, primarily for use in turkeys.

=== Medical use ===
During the 17th, 18th, and 19th centuries, a number of arsenic compounds were used as medicines, including arsphenamine (by Paul Ehrlich) and arsenic trioxide (by Thomas Fowler), for treating diseases such as cancer or psoriasis. Arsphenamine, as well as neosalvarsan, was indicated for syphilis, but has been superseded by modern antibiotics. However, arsenicals such as melarsoprol are still used for the treatment of trypanosomiasis in spite of their severe toxicity, since the disease is almost uniformly fatal if untreated. In 2000 the US Food and Drug Administration approved arsenic trioxide for the treatment of patients with acute promyelocytic leukemia that is resistant to all-trans retinoic acid.

A 2008 paper reports success in locating tumors using arsenic-74 (a positron emitter). This isotope produces clearer PET scan images than the previous radioactive agent, iodine-124, because the body tends to transport iodine to the thyroid gland producing signal noise. Nanoparticles of arsenic have shown ability to kill cancer cells with lesser cytotoxicity than other arsenic formulations.

=== Alloys ===
The main use of arsenic is in alloying with lead. Lead components in car batteries are strengthened by the presence of a very small percentage of arsenic. Dezincification of brass (a copper-zinc alloy) is greatly reduced by the addition of arsenic. "Phosphorus Deoxidized Arsenical Copper" with an arsenic content of 0.3% has an increased corrosion stability in certain environments. Gallium arsenide is an important semiconductor material, used in integrated circuits. Circuits made from GaAs are much faster (but also much more expensive) than those made from silicon. Unlike silicon, GaAs has a direct bandgap, and can be used in laser diodes and LEDs to convert electrical energy directly into light.

=== Military ===
After World War I, the United States built a stockpile of 20,000 tons of weaponized lewisite (ClCH=CHAsCl_{2}), an organoarsenic vesicant (blister agent) and lung irritant. The stockpile was neutralized with bleach and dumped into the Gulf of Mexico in the 1950s. Lewisite, the chemical warfare agent, is known for its acute toxicity to aquatic organisms. However, studies assessing the environmental impact of this disposal in the Gulf are lacking. During the Vietnam War, the United States used Agent Blue, a mixture of sodium cacodylate and its acid form, as one of the rainbow herbicides to deprive North Vietnamese soldiers of foliage cover and rice.

=== Other uses ===
- Copper acetoarsenite was used as a green pigment known under many names, including Paris Green and Emerald Green. It caused numerous arsenic poisonings. Scheele's Green, a copper arsenate, was used in the 19th century as a coloring agent in sweets. Interestingly, some people believe that Napoleon died from the wallpaper on the wall where he was imprisoned. This wallpaper was painted with this green pigment, which will be decomposed by bacteria in a humid environment to produce highly toxic arsine.
- Arsenic is used in bronzing.
- As much as 2% of produced arsenic is used in lead alloys for lead shot and bullets.
- Arsenic is added in small quantities to alpha-brass to make it dezincification-resistant. This grade of brass is used in plumbing fittings and other wet environments.
- Arsenic is also used for taxonomic sample preservation. It was also used in embalming fluids historically.
- Arsenic was used in the taxidermy process up until the 1980s.
- Arsenic was used as an opacifier in ceramics, creating white glazes.
- Until recently, arsenic was used in optical glass. Modern glass manufacturers have ceased using both arsenic and lead.

== Biological role ==
=== Bacteria ===
Some species of bacteria obtain their energy in the absence of oxygen by oxidizing various fuels while reducing arsenate to arsenite. Under oxidative environmental conditions some bacteria use arsenite as fuel, which they oxidize to arsenate. The enzymes involved are known as arsenate reductases (Arr).

In 2008, bacteria were discovered that employ a version of photosynthesis in the absence of oxygen with arsenites as electron donors, producing arsenates (just as ordinary photosynthesis uses water as electron donor, producing molecular oxygen). Researchers conjecture that, over the course of history, these photosynthesizing organisms produced the arsenates that allowed the arsenate-reducing bacteria to thrive. One strain, PHS-1, has been isolated and is related to the gammaproteobacterium Ectothiorhodospira shaposhnikovii. The mechanism is unknown, but an encoded Arr enzyme may function in reverse to its known homologues.

In 2010, researchers reported the discovery of a strain of the bacterium Halomonas (designated GFAJ-1) that was allegedly capable of substituting arsenic for phosphorus in its biomolecules, including DNA, when grown in an arsenic-rich, phosphate-limited environment. This claim, published in Science, suggested that arsenic could potentially serve as a building block of life in place of phosphorus, challenging long-standing assumptions about biochemical requirements for life on Earth.

The claim was met with widespread skepticism. Subsequent studies provided evidence contradicting the initial findings. One follow-up study published in Science in 2011 demonstrated that GFAJ-1 still requires phosphate to grow and does not incorporate arsenate into its DNA in any biologically significant way. Another independent investigation in 2012 used more sensitive techniques to purify and analyze the DNA of GFAJ-1 and found no detectable arsenate incorporated into the DNA backbone. The authors concluded that the original observations were likely due to experimental contamination or insufficient purification methods. Together, these studies reaffirmed phosphorus as an essential element for all known forms of life. In 2025, the journal Science formally retracted the original paper, citing a lack of sufficient experimental support for its key conclusions, though the authors continued to stand by their data.

=== Potential role in animals ===
Arsenic may be an essential trace mineral in birds, involved in the synthesis of methionine metabolites. However, the role of arsenic in bird nutrition is disputed, as other authors state that arsenic is toxic in small amounts.

Some evidence indicates that arsenic is an essential trace mineral in mammals.

Experimental studies in rodents and livestock have shown that arsenic deprivation can lead to impaired growth, reduced reproductive performance, and abnormal glucose metabolism, suggesting it may play a role in essential metabolic processes. Arsenic has been proposed to participate in methylation reactions, possibly influencing gene regulation and detoxification pathways. However, because the threshold between beneficial and toxic exposure is extremely narrow, arsenic is not currently classified as an essential element for humans, and its physiological role in higher animals remains uncertain.

=== Heredity ===
Arsenic has been linked to epigenetic changes, heritable changes in gene expression that occur without changes in DNA sequence. These include DNA methylation, histone modification, and RNA interference. Toxic levels of arsenic cause significant DNA hypermethylation of tumor suppressor genes p16 and p53, thus increasing risk of carcinogenesis. These epigenetic events have been studied in vitro using human kidney cells and in vivo using rat liver cells and peripheral blood leukocytes in humans. Inductively coupled plasma mass spectrometry (ICP-MS) is used to detect precise levels of intracellular arsenic and other arsenic bases involved in epigenetic modification of DNA. Studies investigating arsenic as an epigenetic factor can be used to develop precise biomarkers of exposure and susceptibility.

The Chinese brake fern (Pteris vittata) hyperaccumulates arsenic from the soil into its leaves and has a proposed use in phytoremediation.

=== Biomethylation ===
Arsenobetaine

Inorganic arsenic and its compounds, upon entering the food chain, are progressively metabolized through a process of methylation. For example, the mold Scopulariopsis brevicaulis produces trimethylarsine if inorganic arsenic is present. The organic compound arsenobetaine is found in some marine foods such as fish and algae, and also in mushrooms in larger concentrations. The average person's intake is about 10–50 μg/day. Values about 1000 μg are not unusual following consumption of fish or mushrooms, but there is little danger in eating fish because this arsenic compound is nearly non-toxic.

== Environmental issues ==
=== Exposure ===
Naturally occurring sources of human exposure include volcanic ash, weathering of minerals and ores, and mineralized groundwater. Arsenic is also found in food, water, soil, and air. Arsenic is absorbed by all plants, but is more concentrated in leafy vegetables, rice, apple and grape juice, and seafood. An additional route of exposure is inhalation of atmospheric gases and dusts. During the Victorian era, arsenic was widely used in home decor, especially wallpapers. In Europe, an analysis based on 20,000 soil samples across all 28 countries show that 98% of sampled soils have concentrations less than 20 mg/kg. In addition, the arsenic hotspots are related to both frequent fertilization and close distance to mining activities. Chronic exposure to arsenic, particularly through contaminated drinking water and food, has also been linked to long-term impacts on cognitive function, including reduced verbal IQ and memory.

=== Occurrence in drinking water ===
Extensive arsenic contamination of groundwater has led to widespread arsenic poisoning in Bangladesh and neighboring countries. It is estimated that approximately 57 million people in the Bengal basin are drinking groundwater with arsenic concentrations elevated above the World Health Organization's standard of 10 parts per billion (ppb). However, a study of cancer rates in Taiwan suggested that significant increases in cancer mortality appear only at levels above 150 ppb. The arsenic in the groundwater is of natural origin, and is released from the sediment into the groundwater, caused by the anoxic conditions of the subsurface. This groundwater was used after local and western NGOs and the Bangladeshi government undertook a massive shallow tube well drinking-water program in the late twentieth century. This program was designed to prevent drinking of bacteria-contaminated surface waters, but failed to test for arsenic in the groundwater. Many other countries and districts in Southeast Asia, such as Vietnam and Cambodia, have geological environments that produce groundwater with a high arsenic content. Arsenicosis was reported in Nakhon Si Thammarat, Thailand, in 1987, and the Chao Phraya River probably contains high levels of naturally occurring dissolved arsenic without being a public health problem because much of the public uses bottled water. In Pakistan, more than 60 million people are exposed to arsenic polluted drinking water indicated by a 2017 report in Science. Podgorski's team investigated more than 1200 samples and more than 66% exceeded the WHO contamination limits of 10 micrograms per liter.

Since the 1980s, residents of the Ba Men region of Inner Mongolia, China have been chronically exposed to arsenic through drinking water from contaminated wells. A 2009 research study observed an elevated presence of skin lesions among residents with well water arsenic concentrations between 5 and 10 μg/L, suggesting that arsenic-induced toxicity may occur at relatively low concentrations with chronic exposure. Overall, 20 of China's 34 provinces have high arsenic concentrations in the groundwater supply, potentially exposing 19 million people to hazardous drinking water.

A study by IIT Kharagpur found high levels of Arsenic in groundwater of 20% of India's land, exposing more than 250 million people. States such as Punjab, Bihar, West Bengal, Assam, Haryana, Uttar Pradesh, and Gujarat have highest land area exposed to arsenic.

In the United States, arsenic is most commonly found in the ground waters of the southwest. Parts of New England, Michigan, Wisconsin, Minnesota and the Dakotas are also known to have significant concentrations of arsenic in ground water. Increased levels of skin cancer have been associated with arsenic exposure in Wisconsin, even at levels below the 10 ppb drinking water standard. According to a recent film funded by the US Superfund, millions of private wells have unknown arsenic levels, and in some areas of the US, more than 20% of the wells may contain levels that exceed established limits.

Low-level exposure to arsenic at concentrations of 100 ppb (i.e., above the 10 ppb drinking water standard) compromises the initial immune response to H1N1 or swine flu infection according to NIEHS-supported scientists. The study, conducted in laboratory mice, suggests that people exposed to arsenic in their drinking water may be at increased risk for more serious illness or death from the virus.

Some Canadians are drinking water that contains inorganic arsenic. Private-dug–well waters are most at risk for containing inorganic arsenic. Preliminary well water analysis typically does not test for arsenic. Researchers at the Geological Survey of Canada have modeled relative variation in natural arsenic hazard potential for the province of New Brunswick. This study has important implications for potable water and health concerns relating to inorganic arsenic.

Epidemiological evidence from Chile shows a dose-dependent connection between chronic arsenic exposure and various forms of cancer, in particular when other risk factors, such as cigarette smoking, are present. These effects have been demonstrated at contaminations less than 50 ppb. Arsenic is itself a constituent of tobacco smoke.

Analyzing multiple epidemiological studies on inorganic arsenic exposure suggests a small but measurable increase in risk for bladder cancer at 10 ppb. According to Peter Ravenscroft of the Department of Geography at the University of Cambridge, roughly 80 million people worldwide consume between 10 and 50 ppb arsenic in their drinking water. If they all consumed exactly 10 ppb arsenic in their drinking water, the previously cited multiple epidemiological study analysis would predict an additional 2,000 cases of bladder cancer alone. This represents a clear underestimate of the overall impact, since it does not include lung or skin cancer, and explicitly underestimates the exposure. Those exposed to levels of arsenic above the current WHO standard should weigh the costs and benefits of arsenic remediation.

Early (1973) evaluations of the processes for removing dissolved arsenic from drinking water demonstrated the efficacy of co-precipitation with either iron or aluminium oxides. In particular, iron as a coagulant was found to remove arsenic with an efficacy exceeding 90%. Several adsorptive media systems have been approved for use at point-of-service in a study funded by the United States Environmental Protection Agency (US EPA) and the National Science Foundation (NSF). A team of European and Indian scientists and engineers have set up six arsenic treatment plants in West Bengal based on in-situ remediation method (SAR Technology). This technology does not use any chemicals and arsenic is left in an insoluble form (+5 state) in the subterranean zone by recharging aerated water into the aquifer and developing an oxidation zone that supports arsenic oxidizing micro-organisms. This process does not produce any waste stream or sludge and is relatively cheap.

Another effective and inexpensive method to avoid arsenic contamination is to sink wells 500 feet or deeper to reach purer waters. A recent 2011 study funded by the US National Institute of Environmental Health Sciences' Superfund Research Program shows that deep sediments can remove arsenic and take it out of circulation. In this process, called adsorption, arsenic sticks to the surfaces of deep sediment particles and is naturally removed from the ground water.

Magnetic separations of arsenic at very low magnetic field gradients with high-surface-area and monodisperse magnetite (Fe_{3}O_{4}) nanocrystals have been demonstrated in point-of-use water purification. Using the high specific surface area of Fe_{3}O_{4} nanocrystals, the mass of waste associated with arsenic removal from water has been dramatically reduced.

Epidemiological studies have suggested a correlation between chronic consumption of drinking water contaminated with arsenic and the incidence of all leading causes of mortality. The literature indicates that arsenic exposure is causative in the pathogenesis of diabetes.

Chaff-based filters have recently been shown to reduce the arsenic content of water to 3 μg/L. This may find applications in areas where the potable water is extracted from underground aquifers.

==== San Pedro de Atacama ====
For several centuries, the people of San Pedro de Atacama in Chile have been drinking water that is contaminated with arsenic, and some evidence suggests they have developed some immunity. Genetic studies indicate that certain populations in this region have undergone natural selection for gene variants that enhance arsenic metabolism and detoxification. This adaptation is considered one of the few documented cases of human evolution in response to chronic environmental arsenic exposure.

==== Hazard maps for contaminated groundwater ====
Around one-third of the world's population drinks water from groundwater resources. Of this, about 10 percent, approximately 300 million people, obtains water from groundwater resources that are contaminated with unhealthy levels of arsenic or fluoride. These trace elements derive mainly from minerals and ions in the ground.

=== Redox transformation of arsenic in natural waters ===
Arsenic is unique among the trace metalloids and oxyanion-forming trace metals (e.g. As, Se, Sb, Mo, V, Cr, U, Re). It is sensitive to mobilization at pH values typical of natural waters (pH 6.5–8.5) under both oxidizing and reducing conditions. Arsenic can occur in the environment in several oxidation states (−3, 0, +3 and +5), but in natural waters it is mostly found in inorganic forms as oxyanions of trivalent arsenite [As(III)] or pentavalent arsenate [As(V)]. Organic forms of arsenic are produced by biological activity, mostly in surface waters, but are rarely quantitatively important. Organic arsenic compounds may, however, occur where waters are significantly impacted by industrial pollution.

Arsenic may be solubilized by various processes. When pH is high, arsenic may be released from surface binding sites that lose their positive charge. When water level drops and sulfide minerals are exposed to air, arsenic trapped in sulfide minerals can be released into water. When organic carbon is present in water, bacteria are fed by directly reducing As(V) to As(III) or by reducing the element at the binding site, releasing inorganic arsenic.

The aquatic transformations of arsenic are affected by pH, reduction-oxidation potential, organic matter concentration and the concentrations and forms of other elements, especially iron and manganese. The main factors are pH and the redox potential. Generally, the main forms of arsenic under oxic conditions are H_{3}AsO_{4}, H_{2}AsO_{4}^{−}, HAsO_{4}^{2−}, and AsO_{4}^{3−} at pH 2, 2–7, 7–11 and 11, respectively. Under reducing conditions, H_{3}AsO_{4} is predominant at pH 2–9.

Oxidation and reduction affects the migration of arsenic in subsurface environments. Arsenite is the most stable soluble form of arsenic in reducing environments and arsenate, which is less mobile than arsenite, is dominant in oxidizing environments at neutral pH. Therefore, arsenic may be more mobile under reducing conditions. The reducing environment is also rich in organic matter which may enhance the solubility of arsenic compounds. As a result, the adsorption of arsenic is reduced and dissolved arsenic accumulates in groundwater. That is why the arsenic content is higher in reducing environments than in oxidizing environments.

The presence of sulfur is another factor that affects the transformation of arsenic in natural water. Arsenic can precipitate when metal sulfides form. In this way, arsenic is removed from the water and its mobility decreases. When oxygen is present, bacteria oxidize reduced sulfur to generate energy, potentially releasing bound arsenic.

Redox reactions involving Fe also appear to be essential factors in the fate of arsenic in aquatic systems. The reduction of iron oxyhydroxides plays a key role in the release of arsenic to water. So arsenic can be enriched in water with elevated Fe concentrations. Under oxidizing conditions, arsenic can be mobilized from pyrite or iron oxides especially at elevated pH. Under reducing conditions, arsenic can be mobilized by reductive desorption or dissolution when associated with iron oxides. The reductive desorption occurs under two circumstances. One is when arsenate is reduced to arsenite which adsorbs to iron oxides less strongly. The other results from a change in the charge on the mineral surface which leads to the desorption of bound arsenic.

Some species of bacteria catalyze redox transformations of arsenic. Dissimilatory arsenate-respiring prokaryotes (DARP) speed up the reduction of As(V) to As(III). DARP use As(V) as the electron acceptor of anaerobic respiration and obtain energy to survive. Other organic and inorganic substances can be oxidized in this process. Chemoautotrophic arsenite oxidizers (CAO) and heterotrophic arsenite oxidizers (HAO) convert As(III) into As(V). CAO combine the oxidation of As(III) with the reduction of oxygen or nitrate. They use obtained energy to fix produce organic carbon from CO_{2}. HAO cannot obtain energy from As(III) oxidation. This process may be an arsenic detoxification mechanism for the bacteria.

Equilibrium thermodynamic calculations predict that As(V) concentrations should be greater than As(III) concentrations in all but strongly reducing conditions, i.e. where sulfate reduction is occurring. However, abiotic redox reactions of arsenic are slow. Oxidation of As(III) by dissolved O_{2} is a particularly slow reaction. For example, Johnson and Pilson (1975) gave half-lives for the oxygenation of As(III) in seawater ranging from several months to a year. In other studies, As(V)/As(III) ratios were stable over periods of days or weeks during water sampling when no particular care was taken to prevent oxidation, again suggesting relatively slow oxidation rates. Cherry found from experimental studies that the As(V)/As(III) ratios were stable in anoxic solutions for up to 3 weeks but that gradual changes occurred over longer timescales. Sterile water samples have been observed to be less susceptible to speciation changes than non-sterile samples. Oremland found that the reduction of As(V) to As(III) in Mono Lake was rapidly catalyzed by bacteria with rate constants ranging from 0.02 to 0.3-day^{−1}.

=== Wood preservation in the US ===
As of 2002, US-based industries consumed 19,600 metric tons of arsenic. Ninety percent of this was used for treatment of wood with chromated copper arsenate (CCA). In 2007, 50% of the 5,280 metric tons of consumption was still used for this purpose. In the United States, the voluntary phasing-out of arsenic in production of consumer products and residential and general consumer construction products began on 31 December 2003, and alternative chemicals are now used, such as Alkaline Copper Quaternary, borates, copper azole, cyproconazole, and propiconazole.

Although discontinued, this application is also one of the most concerning to the general public. The vast majority of older pressure-treated wood was treated with CCA. CCA lumber is still in widespread use in many countries, and was heavily used during the latter half of the 20th century as a structural and outdoor building material. Although the use of CCA lumber was banned in many areas after studies showed that arsenic could leach out of the wood into the surrounding soil (from playground equipment, for instance), a risk is also presented by the burning of older CCA timber. The direct or indirect ingestion of wood ash from burnt CCA lumber has caused fatalities in animals and serious poisonings in humans; the lethal human dose is approximately 20 grams of ash. Scrap CCA lumber from construction and demolition sites may be inadvertently used in commercial and domestic fires. Protocols for safe disposal of CCA lumber are not consistent throughout the world. Widespread landfill disposal of such timber raises some concern, but other studies have shown no arsenic contamination in the groundwater.

=== Mapping of industrial releases in the US ===
One tool that maps the location (and other information) of arsenic releases in the United States is TOXMAP. TOXMAP is a Geographic Information System (GIS) from the Division of Specialized Information Services of the United States National Library of Medicine (NLM) funded by the US Federal Government. With marked-up maps of the United States, TOXMAP enables users to visually explore data from the United States Environmental Protection Agency's (EPA) Toxics Release Inventory and Superfund Basic Research Programs. TOXMAP's chemical and environmental health information is taken from NLM's Toxicology Data Network (TOXNET), PubMed, and from other authoritative sources.

=== Bioremediation ===
Physical, chemical, and biological methods have been used to remediate arsenic contaminated water. Bioremediation is said to be cost-effective and environmentally friendly. Bioremediation of ground water contaminated with arsenic aims to convert arsenite, the toxic form of arsenic to humans, to arsenate. Arsenate (+5 oxidation state) is the dominant form of arsenic in surface water, while arsenite (+3 oxidation state) is the dominant form in hypoxic to anoxic environments. Arsenite is more soluble and mobile than arsenate. Many species of bacteria can transform arsenite to arsenate in anoxic conditions by using arsenite as an electron donor. This is a useful method in ground water remediation. Another bioremediation strategy is to use plants that accumulate arsenic in their tissues via phytoremediation but the disposal of contaminated plant material needs to be considered.

Bioremediation requires careful evaluation and design in accordance with existing conditions. Some sites may require the addition of an electron acceptor while others require microbe supplementation (bioaugmentation). Regardless of the method used, only constant monitoring can prevent future contamination.

=== Arsenic removal ===
Coagulation and flocculation are closely related processes common in arsenate removal from water. Due to the net negative charge carried by arsenate ions, they settle slowly or not at all due to charge repulsion. In coagulation, a positively charged coagulent such as iron and aluminum (commonly used salts: FeCl_{3}, Fe_{2}(SO_{4})_{3}, Al_{2}(SO_{4})_{3}) neutralize the negatively charged arsenate, enable it to settle. Flocculation follows where a flocculant bridges smaller particles and allows the aggregate to precipitate out from water. However, such methods may not be efficient on arsenite as As(III) exists in uncharged arsenious acid, H_{3}AsO_{3}, at near-neutral pH.

The major drawbacks of coagulation and flocculation are the costly disposal of arsenate-concentrated sludge, and possible secondary contamination of environment. Moreover, coagulents such as iron may produce ion contamination that exceeds safety levels.

== Toxicity and precautions ==
Arsenic
Hazards
- GHS labelling
Pictograms	(GHS05: Corrosive) (GHS06: Toxic) (GHS08: Health hazard) (GHS09: Environmental hazard)
Signal word	Danger
Hazard statements	H301+H331, H315, H318, H350, H410
Precautionary statements	P273, P280, P301+P310, P302+P352, P304+P340+P311, P305+P351+P338
NFPA 704 (fire diamond)	3 2 0

Arsenic and many of its compounds (arsine, for instance) are potent poisons.

=== Classification ===
Elemental arsenic and arsenic sulfate and trioxide compounds are classified as "toxic" and "dangerous for the environment" in the European Union under directive 67/548/EEC. The International Agency for Research on Cancer (IARC) recognizes arsenic and inorganic arsenic compounds as group 1 carcinogens, and the EU lists arsenic trioxide, arsenic pentoxide, and arsenate salts as category 1 carcinogens.

Arsenic is known to cause arsenicosis when present in drinking water, "the most common species being arsenate [HAsO_{4}^{2−}; As(V)] and arsenite [H_{3}AsO_{3}; As(III)]".

=== Legal limits, food, and drink ===
In the United States since 2006, the maximum concentration in drinking water allowed by the Environmental Protection Agency (EPA) is 10 ppb and the FDA set the same standard in 2005 for bottled water. The Department of Environmental Protection for New Jersey set a drinking water limit of 5 ppb in 2006. The IDLH (immediately dangerous to life and health) value for arsenic metal and inorganic arsenic compounds is 5 mg/m^{3} (5 ppb). The Occupational Safety and Health Administration has set the permissible exposure limit (PEL) to a time-weighted average (TWA) of 0.01 mg/m^{3} (0.01 ppb), and the National Institute for Occupational Safety and Health (NIOSH) has set the recommended exposure limit (REL) to a 15-minute constant exposure of 0.002 mg/m^{3} (0.002 ppb). The PEL for organic arsenic compounds is a TWA of 0.5 mg/m^{3}. (0.5 ppb).

In 2008, based on its ongoing testing of a wide variety of American foods for toxic chemicals, the U.S. Food and Drug Administration set the "level of concern" for inorganic arsenic in apple and pear juices at 23 ppb, based on non-carcinogenic effects, and began blocking importation of products in excess of this level; it also required recalls for non-conforming domestic products. In 2011, the national Dr. Oz television show broadcast a program highlighting tests performed by an independent lab hired by the producers. Though the methodology was disputed (it did not distinguish between organic and inorganic arsenic) the tests showed levels of arsenic up to 36 ppb. In response, the FDA tested the worst brand from the Dr. Oz show and found much lower levels. Ongoing testing found 95% of the apple juice samples were below the level of concern. Later testing by Consumer Reports showed inorganic arsenic at levels slightly above 10 ppb, and the organization urged parents to reduce consumption. In July 2013, on consideration of consumption by children, chronic exposure, and carcinogenic effect, the FDA established an "action level" of 10 ppb for apple juice, the same as the drinking water standard.

Concern about arsenic in rice in Bangladesh was raised in 2002, but at the time only Australia had a legal limit for food (one milligram per kilogram, or 1000 ppb). Concern was raised about people who were eating U.S. rice exceeding WHO standards for personal arsenic intake in 2005. In 2011, the People's Republic of China set a food standard of 150 ppb for arsenic.

In the United States in 2012, testing by separate groups of researchers at the Children's Environmental Health and Disease Prevention Research Center at Dartmouth College (early in the year, focusing on urinary levels in children) and Consumer Reports (in November) found levels of arsenic in rice that resulted in calls for the FDA to set limits. The FDA released some testing results in September 2012, and as of July 2013, is still collecting data in support of a new potential regulation. It has not recommended any changes in consumer behavior.

Consumer Reports recommended:

1. That the EPA and FDA eliminate arsenic-containing fertilizer, drugs, and pesticides in food production;
2. That the FDA establish a legal limit for food;
3. That industry change production practices to lower arsenic levels, especially in food for children; and
4. That consumers test home water supplies, eat a varied diet, and cook rice with excess water, then draining it off (reducing inorganic arsenic by about one third along with a slight reduction in vitamin content).
5. Evidence-based public health advocates also recommend that, given the lack of regulation or labeling for arsenic in the U.S., children should eat no more than 1.5 servings per week of rice and should not drink rice milk as part of their daily diet before age 5. They also offer recommendations for adults and infants on how to limit arsenic exposure from rice, drinking water, and fruit juice.

A 2014 World Health Organization advisory conference was scheduled to consider limits of 200–300 ppb for rice.

==== Reducing arsenic content in rice ====
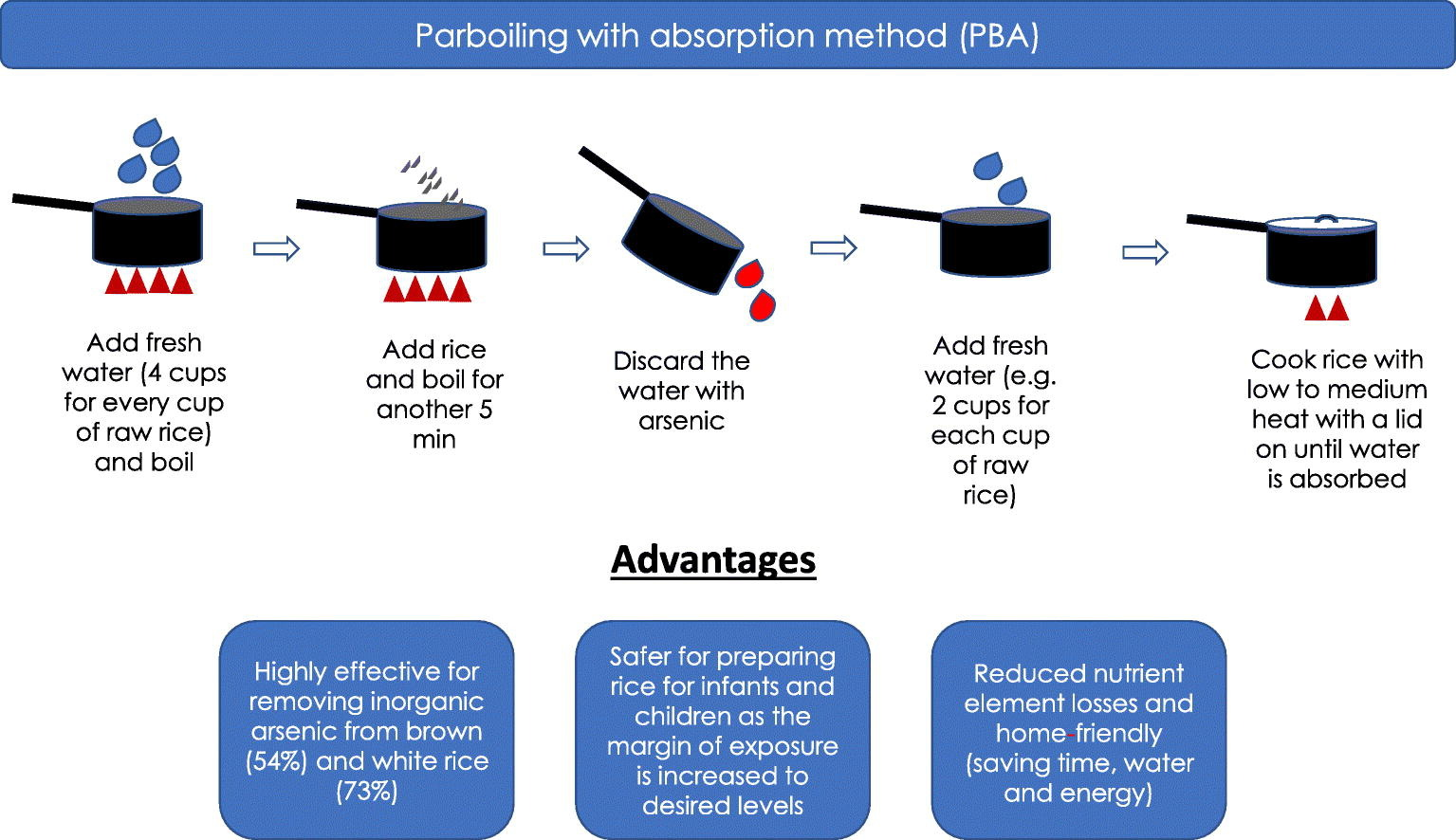
An improved rice cooking approach to maximise arsenic removal while preserving nutrient elements

In 2020, scientists assessed multiple preparation procedures of rice for their capacity to reduce arsenic content and preserve nutrients, recommending a procedure involving parboiling and water-absorption.

=== Occupational exposure limits ===
Country	Limit
Argentina	Confirmed human carcinogen
Australia	TWA 0.05 mg/m^{3} – Carcinogen
Belgium	TWA 0.1 mg/m^{3} – Carcinogen
Bulgaria	Confirmed human carcinogen
Canada	TWA 0.01 mg/m^{3}
Colombia	Confirmed human carcinogen
Denmark	TWA 0.01 mg/m^{3}
Finland	Carcinogen
Egypt	TWA 0.2 mg/m^{3}
Hungary	Ceiling concentration 0.01 mg/m^{3} – Skin, carcinogen
India	TWA 0.2 mg/m^{3}
Japan	Group 1 carcinogen
Jordan	Confirmed human carcinogen
Mexico	TWA 0.2 mg/m^{3}
New Zealand	TWA 0.05 mg/m^{3} – Carcinogen
Norway	TWA 0.02 mg/m^{3}
Philippines	TWA 0.5 mg/m^{3}
Poland	TWA 0.01 mg/m^{3}
Singapore	Confirmed human carcinogen
South Korea	TWA 0.01 mg/m^{3}
Sweden	TWA 0.01 mg/m^{3}
Thailand	TWA 0.5 mg/m^{3}
Turkey	TWA 0.5 mg/m^{3}
United Kingdom	TWA 0.1 mg/m^{3}
United States	TWA 0.01 mg/m^{3}
Vietnam	Confirmed human carcinogen

=== Ecotoxicity ===
Arsenic is bioaccumulative in many organisms, marine species in particular, but it does not appear to biomagnify significantly in food webs. In polluted areas, plant growth may be affected by root uptake of arsenate, which is a phosphate analog and therefore readily transported in plant tissues and cells. In polluted areas, uptake of the more toxic arsenite ion (found more particularly in reducing conditions) is likely in poorly drained soils.

=== Toxicity in animals ===
Compound	Animal	LD_{50}	Route
Arsenic	Rat	763 mg/kg	oral
Arsenic	Mouse	145 mg/kg	oral
Calcium arsenate	Rat	20 mg/kg	oral
Calcium arsenate	Mouse	794 mg/kg	oral
Calcium arsenate	Rabbit	50 mg/kg	oral
Calcium arsenate	Dog	38 mg/kg	oral
Lead arsenate	Rabbit	75 mg/kg	oral

Compound	Animal	LD_{50}	Route
Arsenic trioxide (As(III))	Mouse	26 mg/kg	oral
Arsenite (As(III))	Mouse	8 mg/kg	im
Arsenate (As(V))	Mouse	21 mg/kg	im
MMA (As(III))	Hamster	2 mg/kg	ip
MMA (As(V))	Mouse	916 mg/kg	oral
DMA (As(V))	Mouse	648 mg/kg	oral
im = injected intramuscularly ip = administered intraperitoneally

=== Biological mechanism ===
Arsenic's toxicity comes from the affinity of arsenic(III) oxides for thiols. Thiols, in the form of cysteine residues and cofactors such as lipoic acid and coenzyme A, are situated at the active sites of many important enzymes.

Arsenic disrupts ATP production through several mechanisms. At the level of the citric acid cycle, arsenic inhibits lipoic acid, which is a cofactor for pyruvate dehydrogenase. By competing with phosphate, arsenate uncouples oxidative phosphorylation, thus inhibiting energy-linked reduction of NAD+, mitochondrial respiration and ATP synthesis. Hydrogen peroxide production is also increased, which, it is speculated, has potential to form reactive oxygen species and oxidative stress. These metabolic interferences lead to death from multi-system organ failure. The organ failure is presumed to be from necrotic cell death, not apoptosis, since energy reserves have been too depleted for apoptosis to occur.

=== Exposure risks and remediation ===
Occupational exposure and arsenic poisoning may occur in people working in industries involving the use of inorganic arsenic and its compounds, such as wood preservation, glass production, nonferrous metal alloys, and electronic semiconductor manufacturing. Inorganic arsenic is also found in coke oven emissions associated with the smelter industry.

The conversion between As(III) and As(V) is a large factor in arsenic environmental contamination. According to Croal, Gralnick, Malasarn and Newman, "[the] understanding [of] what stimulates As(III) oxidation and/or limits As(V) reduction is relevant for bioremediation of contaminated sites (Croal). The study of chemolithoautotrophic As(III) oxidizers and the heterotrophic As(V) reducers can help the understanding of the oxidation and/or reduction of arsenic.

=== Treatment ===
Treatment of chronic arsenic poisoning is possible. British anti-lewisite (dimercaprol) is prescribed in doses of 5 mg/kg up to 300 mg every 4 hours for the first day, then every 6 hours for the second day, and finally every 8 hours for 8 additional days. However the USA's Agency for Toxic Substances and Disease Registry (ATSDR) states that the long-term effects of arsenic exposure cannot be predicted. Blood, urine, hair, and nails may be tested for arsenic; however, these tests cannot foresee possible health outcomes from the exposure. Long-term exposure and consequent excretion through urine has been linked to bladder and kidney cancer in addition to cancer of the liver, prostate, skin, lungs, and nasal cavity.

== See also ==
- Aqua Tofana
- Arsenic and Old Lace
- Grainger challenge
- Hypothetical types of biochemistry

== Bibliography ==
- Emsley J (2011). "Arsenic". Nature's Building Blocks: An A–Z Guide to the Elements. Oxford, UK: Oxford University Press. pp. 47–55. ISBN 978-0-19-960563-7.
- Greenwood NN, Earnshaw A (1997). Chemistry of the Elements (2nd ed.). Butterworth-Heinemann. doi:10.1016/C2009-0-30414-6. ISBN 978-0-08-037941-8.
- Rieuwerts J (2015). The Elements of Environmental Pollution. London: Routledge, Taylor & Francis Group/Earthscan. ISBN 978-0-415-85920-2.
