= Conifer release =

Forest management term

Conifer release is a term used in forest management circles to denote selective silvicide and herbicide use, in order to promote conifers at the expense of alternate species. An Oregon State University Extension Service specialist wrote in 2014 that:

On sites recently reforested after a timber harvest, competing plants grow quickly. Competition for essential growth elements—sunlight, moisture, and nutrients—often depresses the vigor and survival of the desired crop trees. Competition comes from grasses, broadleaf weeds (called forbs), shrubs, or less valuable tree species.

== History ==
Weyerhauser used Glyphosate as early as 1979 for its conifer release programme.

Scientists noted in 1997 that the below- and near-ground microclimates were affected by conifer release treatments.

Scientists at the Lakehead University used Vision (a trade-mark of Monsanto) in 1998 to suppress Vaccinium blueberry production and hence to promote conifer release in a jack pine plantation.

== List of herbicides ==
A partial list of common pesticides employed as early as 1981 for conifer release is found below.

- Amitrole
- Aminocarb (Matacil)
- Atrazine
- Dalapon
- Dicamba
- 2,4-D
- Fosamine ammonium
- Glyphosate (Vision)
- Hexazinone
- Mexacarbate (Zectran)
- MSMA
- Picloram
- Simazine
- Triclopyr
