= Old Lace =

Old Lace may refer to:

- Old Lace (color), a very pale yellowish orange like the color of an old lace tablecloth
- Old Lace (comics), a fictional dinosaur
- "Old Lace" (song), a song from 1933 by Isham Jones and Charles Newman

== See also ==
- Arsenic and Old Lace (disambiguation)
