= MSMA =

MSMA may stand for:

- Magnetic shape-memory alloy, a type of smart material
- Monosodium methyl arsonate, an arsenic-based herbicide
