= Kalgoorlieite =

Telluride mineral

General
- Category: Telluride mineral
- Formula: As_{2}Te_{3}
- IMA symbol: Kgl
- Strunz classification: 2
- Crystal system: Monoclinic
- Crystal class: Prismatic (2/m) (same H-M symbol)
- Space group: C2/m
- Unit cell: a = 14.3573(9) Å b = 14.3573(9) Å c = 14.3573(9) Å β = 95.107(5)°

Identification

Kalgoorlieite (IMA2015-119) is a mineral from Kalgoorlie, Western Australia.

Kalgoorlieite is the fourth oxygen-free arsenic-tellurium mineral after benleonardite, debattistiite, and törnroosite.

It was discovered in 2015 by a Curtin University academic Dr Kirsten Rempel while she was checking samples in the Kalgoorlie School of Mines Museum, and declared a new mineral in 2016, after verification and classification.
