= Silvicide =

Type of chemical used to kill brush and trees

As herbicides are pesticides used to kill unwanted plants, silvicides are special pesticides (cacodylic acid or MSMA, for instance) used to kill brush and trees. They can wipe out entire forests or specific, unwanted forest species.

== See also ==
- Bioherbicide
- Deforestation
- List of environmental health hazards
- Soil contamination
- Surface runoff
