= Lead hydrogen arsenate =

Names
- Other names Lead (II) monohydrogen arsenate

Identifiers
CAS Number	7784-40-9
3D model (JSmol)	Interactive image
ChEBI	CHEBI:81881
ChemSpider	22976
ECHA InfoCard	100.029.149
EC Number	232-064-2
PubChem CID	24572
UNII	A9AI2R9EWN
UN number	1617
CompTox Dashboard (EPA)	DTXSID4042092
- InChI: InChI=1S/AsH3O4.Pb/c2-1(3,4)5;/h(H3,2,3,4,5);/q;+2/p-2 Key: UWRBYRMOUPAKLM-UHFFFAOYSA-L
- SMILES: O[As](=O)([O-])[O-].[Pb+2]

Properties
Chemical formula	PbHAsO_{4}
Molar mass	347.1 g·mol^{−1}
Appearance	white solid
Density	5.943 g/cm^{3}
Melting point	Decomposes at 280°C
Solubility in water	Insoluble in water; soluble in nitric acid and alkalies

Hazards
- GHS labelling
Pictograms	(GHS06: Toxic) (GHS08: Health hazard) (GHS09: Environmental hazard)
Signal word	Danger
Hazard statements	H301, H331, H350, H360Df, H373, H410
Precautionary statements	P201, P202, P260, P264, P270, P271, P273, P281, P301+P310, P304+P340, P308+P313, P311, P314, P321, P330, P391, P403+P233, P405, P501
- Except where otherwise noted, data are given for materials in their standard state (at 25 °C [77 °F], 100 kPa). Infobox references

Lead hydrogen arsenate, also called lead arsenate, acid lead arsenate or LA, chemical formula PbHAsO_{4}, is an inorganic insecticide formerly used to control pests including Lymantria dispar, known as the spongy moth, the potato beetle and rats.

Lead arsenate was the most extensively used arsenical insecticide. Two principal formulations of lead arsenate were marketed: basic lead arsenate (Pb_{5}OH(AsO_{4})_{3}, CASN: 1327-31-7) and acid lead arsenate (PbHAsO_{4}).

It is now banned for use as a pesticide in countries such as the US and UK as it is considered too toxic and persistent.

== Production and structure ==
It is usually produced using the following reaction, which leads to formation of the desired product as a solid precipitate:

Pb(NO_{3})_{2} + H_{3}AsO_{4} → PbHAsO_{4} +2 HNO_{3}

It has the same structure as the hydrogen phosphate PbHPO_{4}. Like lead sulfate PbSO_{4}, these salts are poorly soluble.

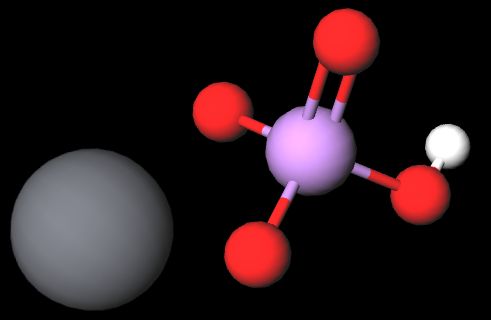
Space-filling model of an acidic lead hydrogen arsenate molecule.

== Uses ==
As an insecticide, it was introduced in 1898 used against the gypsy moth in Massachusetts. It represented a less soluble and less toxic alternative to then-used Paris Green, which is about 10x more toxic. It also adhered better to the surface of the plants, further enhancing and prolonging its insecticidal effect.

Lead arsenate was widely used in Australia, Canada, New Zealand, US, England, France, North Africa, and many other areas, principally against the codling moth and snow-white linden moth. It was used mainly on apples, but also on other fruit trees, garden crops, turfgrasses, and against mosquitoes. In combination with ammonium sulfate, it was used in southern California as a winter treatment on lawns to kill crab grass seed.

The search for a substitute was commenced in 1919, when it was found that its residues remain in the products despite washing their surfaces. Alternatives were found to be less effective or more toxic to plants and animals, until 1947 when DDT was found. US EPA banned use of lead arsenate on food crops in 1988.

== Safety ==
LD50 is 1050 mg/kg (rat, oral).

Morel mushrooms growing in old apple orchards that had been treated with lead arsenate may accumulate levels of toxic lead and arsenic that are unhealthy for human consumption.

Lead arsenate was used as an insecticide in deciduous fruit trees from 1892 until around 1947 in Washington. Peryea et al. studied the distribution of Pb and As in these soils, concluding that these levels were above maximum tolerance levels. This indicates that these levels could be of environmental concern and potentially could be contaminating the groundwater in the area.

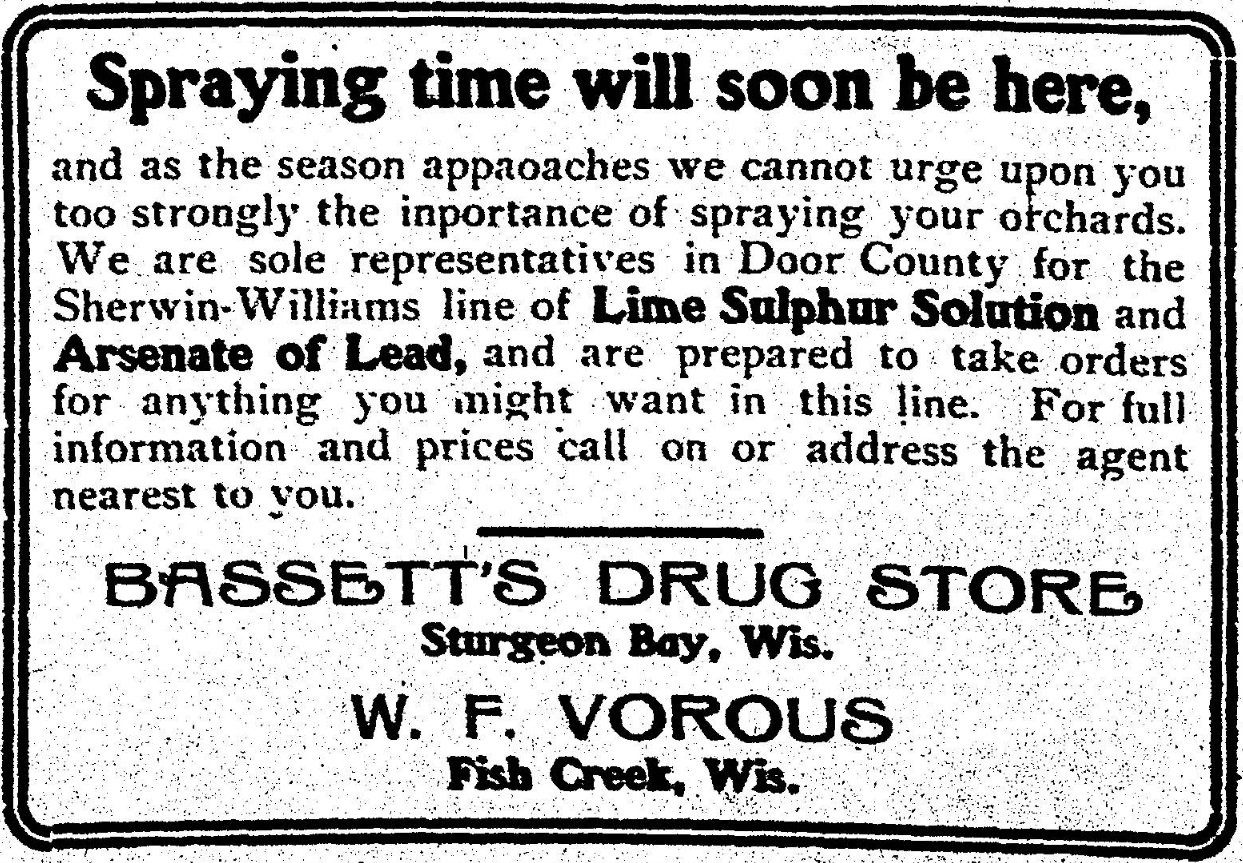
Ad for Sherwin-Williams pesticides from the 1911 Door County Democrat. Today, about 3.9% of the land in the county is classified as "impaired" by the local government due to persistent contamination of the soil and groundwater.

== See also ==
- Calcium arsenate
