= Pollution in Door County, Wisconsin =

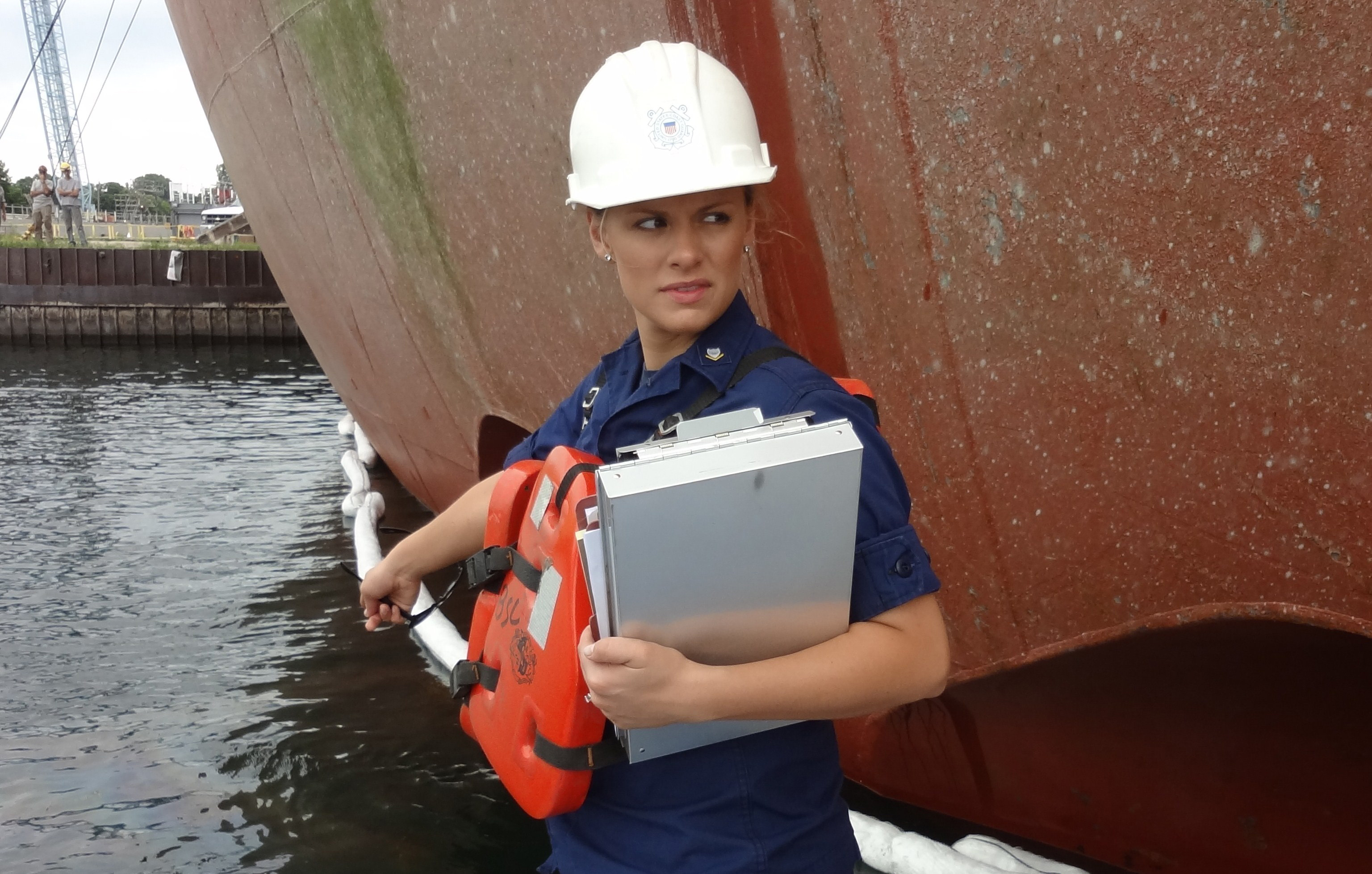
A marine safety technician responds to a reported oil sheen in the ship canal, July 30, 2013. Out of 193 spills of hazardous materials into county waterways from 1971–2015, 84% of them occurred in the Sturgeon Bay area. Most of the spills in the Sturgeon Bay area occurred at ship building and repair businesses. Oil slicks may also come from passing freighters or uncertain sources.

Pollution in Door County, Wisconsin relates to the degree of pollution in the air, water, and land in Door County, Wisconsin. Pollution is defined as the addition of any substance (solid, liquid, or gas) or any form of energy (such as heat, sound, or radioactivity) to the environment at a faster rate than it can be dispersed, diluted, decomposed, recycled, or stored in some harmless form.

== Air ==
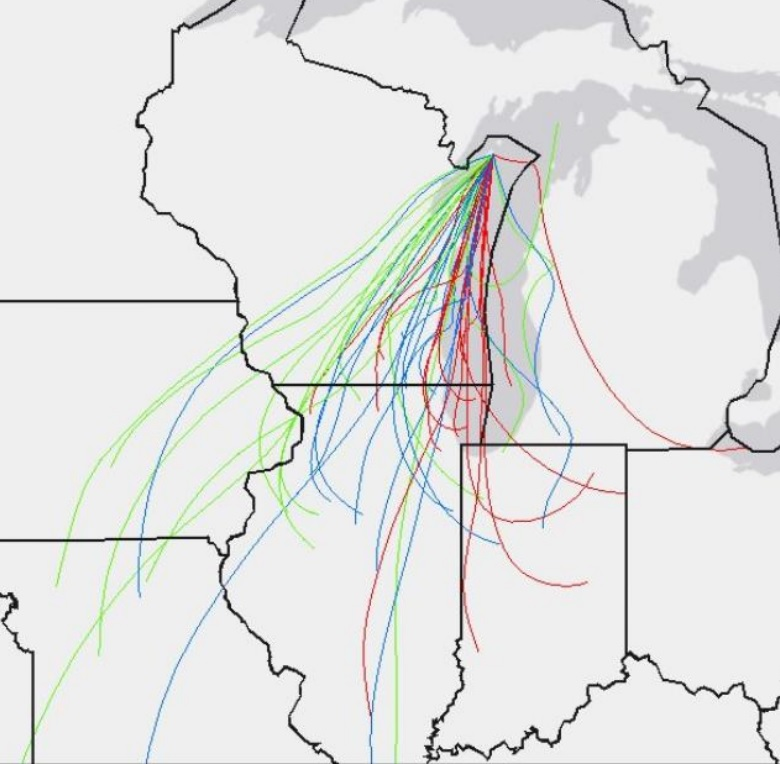
2016 HYSPLIT map

Most air pollution reaching the monitor at Newport State Park comes from outside the county. This map shows how the air travels to the pollution monitor in Newport State Park. Because the monitor is near the shore, only the red lines (which show the lower air currents) meaningfully depict the path of ozone to the monitor. As shown on the map, these lower currents carry polluted air from major urban areas. But further inland, the air from higher up mixes more, so all color lines are significant when tracing the path of air pollution further inland. These higher currents (shown in green and blue) blow in from cleaner, mostly rural areas.

Nitrous oxide concentrations measured by airplane over county waters are not significantly different than those measured closer to the Chicago area.

In 2020, a traffic counter near the Bay View Bridge recorded an average of 12,500 daily vehicles. Pollution modeling predicts the presence of locally generated air pollution associated with vehicular traffic in the city of Sturgeon Bay.

In 2022, the Environmental Protection Agency decided that the northern part of the county met its standard for ozone.

== Wells, soils, and surface waters ==
=== 19th century ===
Water-borne diseases were historically significant in the county. The Belgian migration to the county largely ceased after word of the 1856 cholera epidemic in Door County reached Europe. From 1859 to 1880, more than ten percent of all recorded deaths in the county were caused by dysentery or diarrhea. Death from dysentery or diarrhea was more common in the summer due food and water contamination.

=== Aquifers and springs background ===
==== Aquifers ====
Door County has three types of aquifers. The newest is in a relatively shallow layer of sand and gravel, but tends not to provide enough water except in the southeastern part of the county. Further down are layers of dolomite bedrock that are recharged by water percolating from the layer of sand and gravel. Past the dolomite is a layer of shale that typically does not contain water, although potentially it is a source of oil. Past the shale is a layer of sandstone that is also host to a bedrock aquifer. Only a few wells tap this deepest and oldest aquifer. Due to the tilt of the layers and erosion, there are areas of the county missing certain layers. A study of three city wells serving Sturgeon Bay found that water from the surface fell anywhere from 13 to 115 feet per day from the surface down to the dolomite aquifer. When the snow melted in the spring, the water coming up from one well changed 9 days later to reflect the character of the new meltwater.

==== Springs ====
Groundwater burbles up from the shallow aquifer through the fractured bedrock, forming fracture springs. It also may seep more slowly through the ground, forming seepage springs. Detailed measurements were taken of one fracture and three seepage springs during a 2014–2017 survey. Although the fracture spring had large variations in output, it still had a greater flow rate than the other 409 springs surveyed. It had one of the highest specific conductance measurements (995 μS/cm) among the springs studied, due to the minerals dissolved in the water. A study of wells, springs, and surface waters in six county wetlands took samples from September 2017 to June 2018. Enterococci were found in all of the surface waters and six of the eight springs, but not either of the two wells. An earlier study comparing spring water and well water from five springs and 47 wells in Sevastopol found that spring water was more turbid than well water and more likely to be contaminated by coliform bacteria. Nitrates, chloride, and specific conductance were not significantly different between the springs and wells.

=== Wells ===
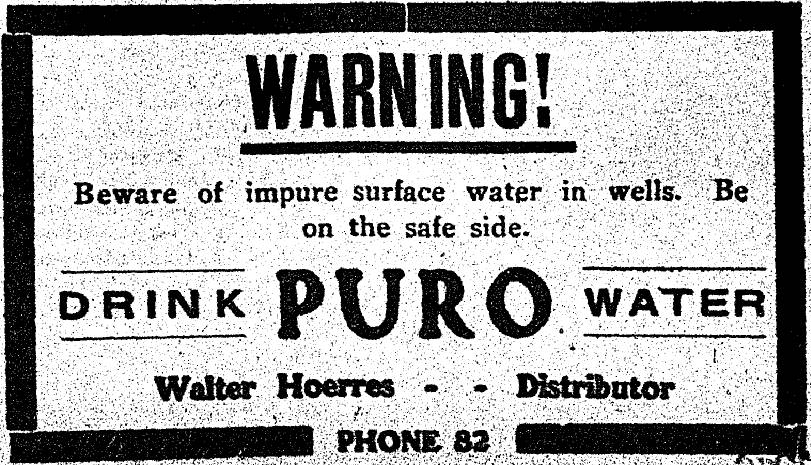
A 1914 ad for bottled water placed in the Door County Democrat

The combination of shallow soils and fractured bedrock makes well water contamination more likely. At any given time, at least one-third of private wells may contain bacteria, and in situations with quickly flowing underground water, wells may test clean one day but contaminated the next. Some household wells turn brown every spring from nearby manure applications. Bacterial contamination of wells is more likely in the summer due to the larger human population. In wells that are contaminated, bacterial concentrations peak during the following rains in the late summer and early fall.

Nearly all soil types in the county which have received a rating for their overall suitability for septic systems are considered to be "very limited" in their utility for septic systems. Out of 292 different combinations of soil associations and types in the county, 124 soil classifications are assigned a "very limited" rating, 4 are assigned a "somewhat limited" rating, and 164 have not been rated. The four which are "somewhat limited" are uncommon in the county. Additionally, certain soil types are especially prone to leeching contaminants into the groundwater. Out of the 74 different total soil types present in the county, 44 types are known to be more susceptible to leaching contaminants into groundwater than typical soils. Out of the 44 more susceptible types, 22 are more susceptible to leaching when the water table is less than 12 inches from the surface, 10 are more susceptible to leaching when the soil is less than 20 inches above the bedrock, and 14 are regarded to be highly permeable soils. Some of the 44 more susceptible soil types have a combination of these characteristics.

In 1968, 44 people on Washington Island were sickened with hepatitis, a food and water-borne disease, and one girl died.

The porous and fractured dolomite bedrock was implicated as a factor in a June 2007 epidemic when 239 patrons and 18 employees of the newly opened Log Den restaurant were sickened by a norovirus. Six were hospitalized. The virus was found to have traveled from a septic field 188 m (617 ft) away to the restaurant's well, contaminating their water. From September to December 2007 a study was conducted in which dyes were placed into the septic system. The dyes traveled through the groundwater at about 2 miles per year, and researchers concluded that viral contaminants could travel "many miles in their life times." For transient non-community public wells such as the one supplying the restaurant, state only regulated for contaminants within a 200-foot radius unless flow studies had previously been done. Modeling research supporting this decision predicted that pathogens would be unlikely to travel more than 155 feet per year.

In September 2014, 16 people fell ill from drinking wellwater after rainwater washed manure went down a sinkhole in Jacksonport.

Short-term rentals are thought to contaminate the groundwater whenever more people stay in a house or cottage than the septic system was designed to handle.

=== Soils and groundwater ===
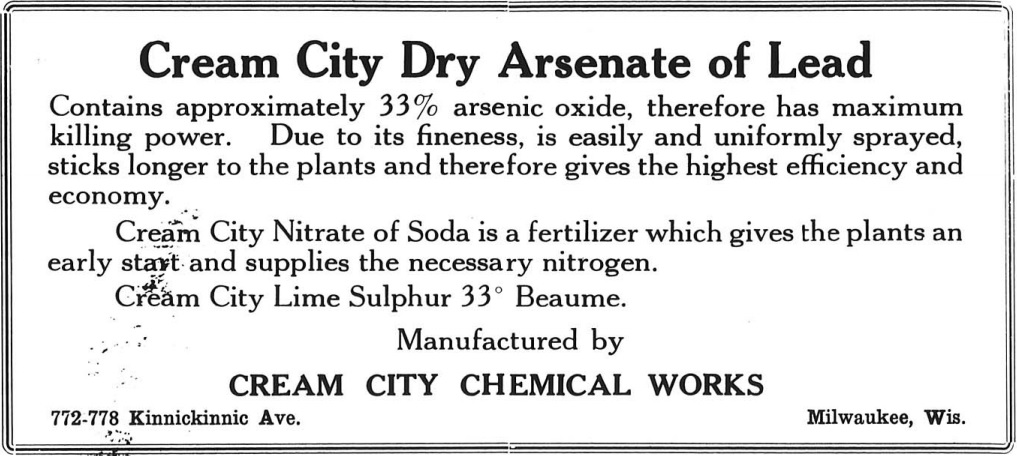
A 1919 ad touting the "maximum killing power" of a particular arsenate of lead pesticide. Also in 1919 it was found that arsenic residues remained on produce after washing. The pesticide began to be at least partially replaced by DDT beginning in 1946 and was later banned for use on food crops in 1988.

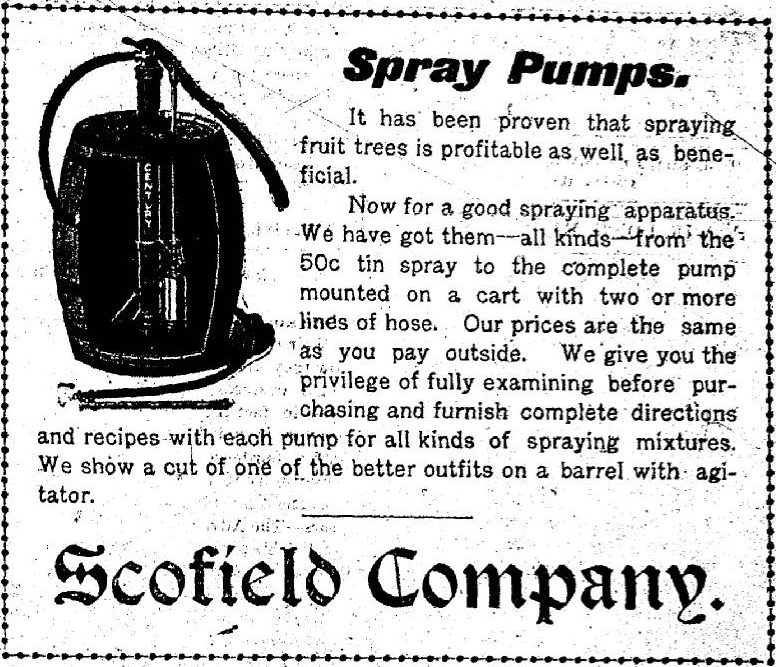
An ad for sprayers placed in the Door County Advocate, 1904

The Wisconsin Department of Natural Resources reports 137 leaking underground storage tank sites, 385 spill locations, and 104 other areas involving contamination, such as of soils and groundwater, including 24 cases which polluted one or more neighboring properties and 82 open cases such as cherry orchards left with arsenic and lead-contaminated soils from pesticide use during the 1960s and earlier. Additionally, two landowners voluntarily cooperated with the DNR, limiting their future liability.

At the peak of fruit production in the 1940s–1950s there were about 12,000 acres of orchards, about 3.9% of the 482 square miles of land in the county. Mines, prior landfills, and former orchard sites are considered impaired lands and specially marked on an electronic county map. A different electronic map shows the locations of private wells polluted with lead, arsenic, copper, and other contaminants down to the section level. A 2020 study sampling 237 private wells found one with a concentration higher than the federal standard. Certain areas appeared to have higher concentrations of arsenic than others.

=== Creeks and Ahnapee River ===
A 2017 study looking at the impacts of nutrient pollution on microbes used DNA analysis to detect human pathogens in May Creek, Keyes Creek, and Sugar Creek during the months of May, September, and October. Aeromonas sobria was detected in May, September, and October, while Pseudomonas alcaligenes was only detected in September. Both species of bacteria are chemoheterotrophs which feed on organic material in the water.

In 2016–2017, water was tested for pharmaceutical chemicals, with samples coming from May Creek, Keyes Creek, and Sugar Creek, and also from the Ahnapee River at the intersection with County Trunk H. The tests found caffeine and acetaminophen in the Ahnapee River, and also the psychiatric drugs fluoxetine and carbamazepine and the antimicrobial triclocarban. Caffeine and carbamazepine were both found in May Creek. Caffeine was found in Keyes Creek and carbamazepine was found in Sugar Creek.

=== In Green Bay ===
A counterclockwise circulation of water along the surface of Green Bay is thought to carry cleaner water south along the western shore of the bay, and nutrient-rich water from the Fox River north along the eastern shore of the bay. The circulation is thought to begin south of the mouth of the Oconto River on the west side. It changes direction at Pensaukee, north of Long Tail Point and continues northward to Sturgeon Bay. The position of Long Tail Point marks the east-west division between the two masses of water.

=== Turbidity ===
It appears that turbidity in Green Bay is higher than in the past, and that at least some of it is due to human impacts. The passage of large ships causes turbulence in the water to an extent comparable to dredging. Additionally, carp in the bay are known to uproot vegetation which could otherwise filter sediments suspended in the water. When storms stir up water in the bay, microorganisms feed more rapidly on the nutrients. This temporarily depletes oxygen levels.

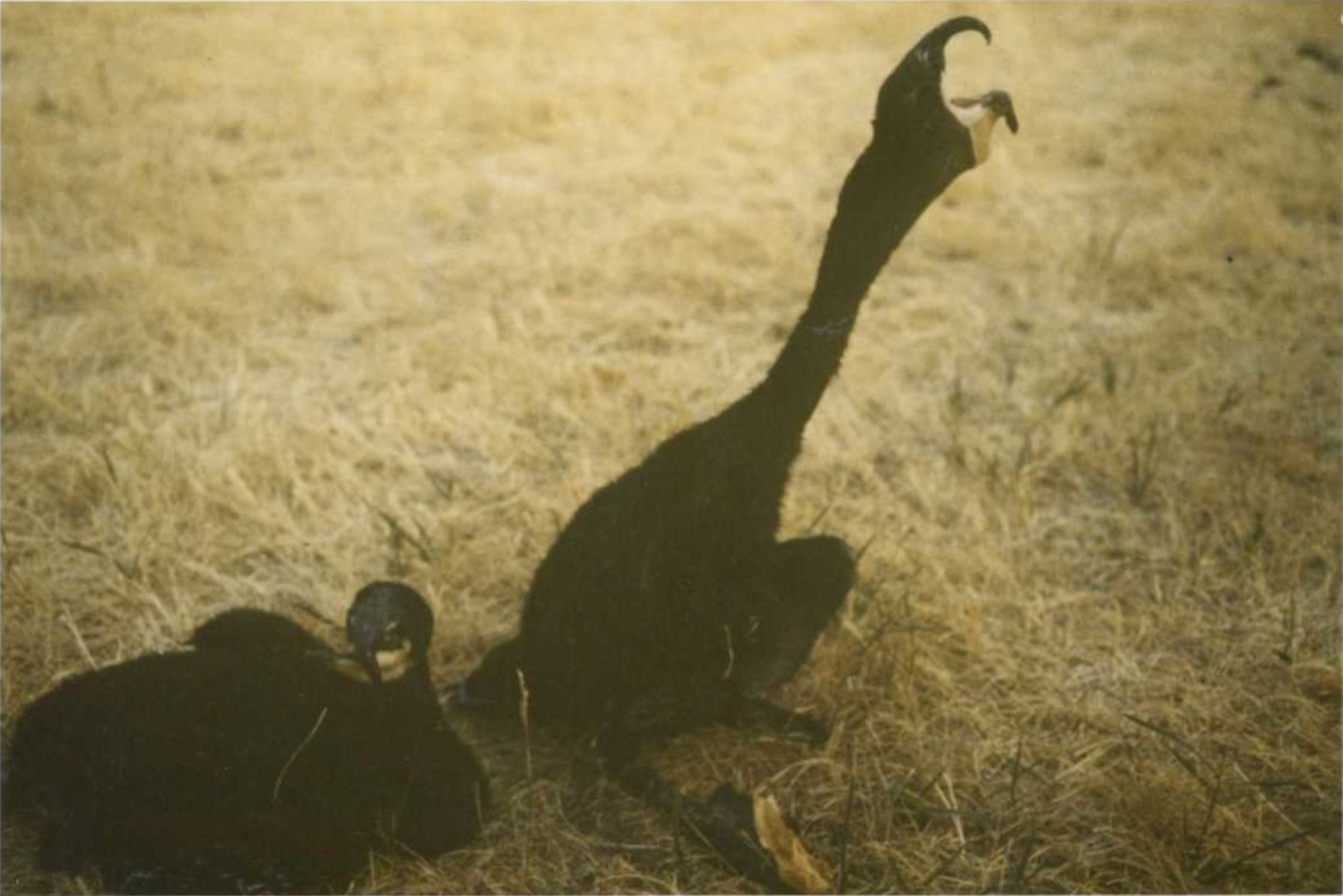
Cormorant chicks with deformed beaks on Spider Island, 1988. Some chicks had beaks which beaks curved over each other, and others had upper and lower beaks that were different sizes from each other. The deformities are thought to be from PCBs bioaccumulating in the cormorants.

=== Bioaccumulation ===
PCBs from Green Bay have been deposited into the county as windborne dust and off of contaminated waters. The state lists 6.85 miles of the Ahnapee River in Door County as an impaired waterway due to PCB pollution, a designation extending past the county line.

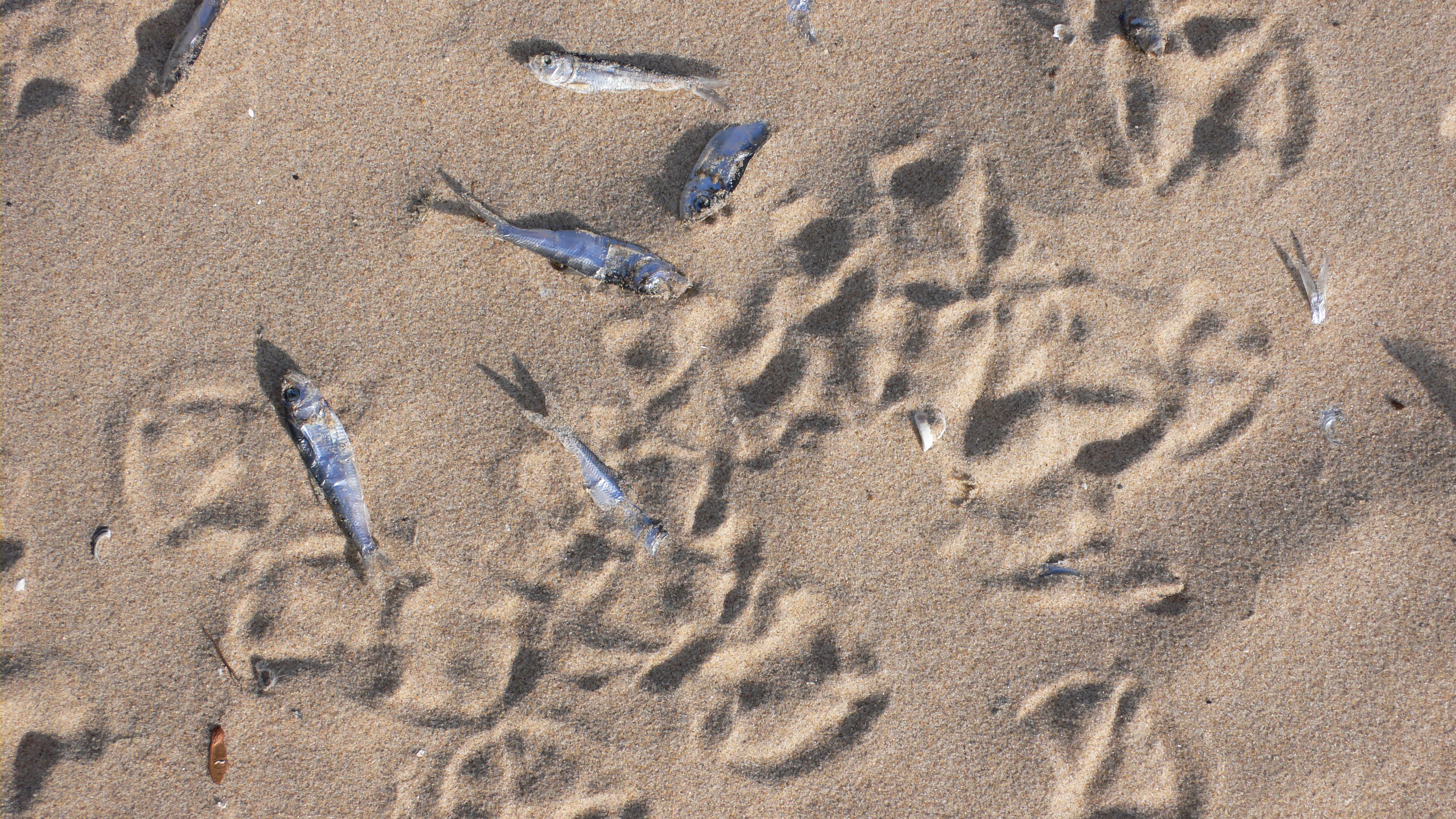
Waterfowl footprints and dead alewives at Whitefish Dunes State Park in 2006. A 2004 study of 10 county beaches counted by far the most birds and bird droppings at Whitefish Dunes, yet it still had the third smallest mean E. coli concentration.

=== Beach contamination ===
32 beaches are routinely monitored for water quality advisories. Before the state beach monitoring program, an outbreak at Nicolet Beach in Peninsula State Park sickened 68 or 69 people in July 2002. A two-year study of selected Door County beaches concluded that neither the abundance of bird droppings nor bird populations reliably predicted E. coli contamination, (Note: Bird counts at 10 beaches in the summer of 2004 (first year of this study) found that Whitefish Dunes had the most birds, followed by Portage Park, Ellison Bay, Egg Harbor, and Bailey's Harbor. Random grid sampling of avian waste found that the beach at Whitefish Dunes had the greatest number of droppings, followed by Portage Park in second place and Bailey's Harbor in third, with Ellison Bay and Sister Bay tying as the beaches with the fourth most droppings. Meanwhile, the five beaches with the highest average E. coli concentrations were at Sunset Park, Otumba, Ellison Bay, Fish Creek, and Egg Harbor.) although rainfall was associated with elevated E. coli levels in six out of eight beaches studied. After a rain, E. coli counts may increase up to three times the normal amount and persist at a higher concentration for up to 12 hours. This could be due to increased stormwater drainage, including possible agricultural waste runoff. From 2011–2015, a beach improvement program worked to reduce runoff.

Mats of Cladophora algae provide homes for Salmonella bacteria.

=== Agricultural nonpoint source pollution ===
In 2017, farmers spent $2,825,000 on agricultural chemicals, in addition to $5,295,000 on fertilizer, lime, and soil conditioners; as a result agricultural practices are a potential source of nonpoint-source pollution.

== See also ==
- Avgas (with tetraethyl lead)
- Sherwin-Williams § New Jersey pollution lawsuit; the company agreed to pay about $14 million to clean up lead arsenate contamination and other pollutants.
- File:Sherwin-Williams brand Lime Sulphur and Arsenate of Lead advertisement 1911 Door County Democrat.jpg
- Door County, Wisconsin § Air
- Pollution in the United States
- PCBs in the United States
- Water pollution in the United States
- Regulation of ship pollution in the United States
- United States environmental law
