= Calcium arsenate =

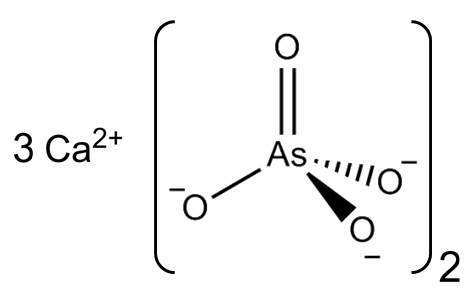
- Calcium arsenate

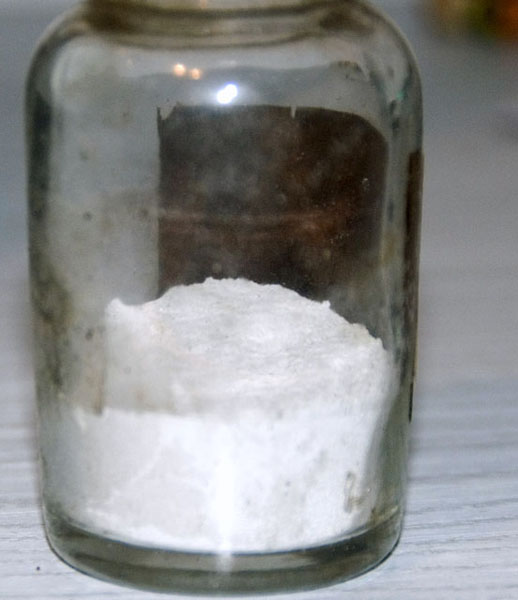
- Calcium arsenate

Names
- IUPAC name Calcium arsorate
- Other names Calcium orthoarsenate Cucumber dust Tricalcium arsenate Tricalcium ortho-arsenate

Identifiers
CAS Number	7778-44-1
3D model (JSmol)	Interactive image
ChemSpider	22909
ECHA InfoCard	100.029.003
EC Number	233-287-8
KEGG	C18647
PubChem CID	24501
RTECS number	CG0830000
UNII	95OX15I8ZU
CompTox Dashboard (EPA)	DTXSID6058182
- InChI: InChI=1S/2AsH3O4.3Ca/c2*2-1(3,4)5;;;/h2*(H3,2,3,4,5);;;/q;;3*+2/p-6 Key: RMBBSOLAGVEUSI-UHFFFAOYSA-H; InChI=1/2AsH3O4.3Ca/c2*2-1(3,4)5;;;/h2*(H3,2,3,4,5);;;/q;;3*+2/p-6 Key: RMBBSOLAGVEUSI-CYFPFDDLAC
- SMILES: [O-][As](=O)([O-])[O-].[O-][As](=O)([O-])[O-].[Ca+2].[Ca+2].[Ca+2]

Properties
Chemical formula	Ca_{3}(AsO_{4})_{2}
Molar mass	398.072 g/mol
Appearance	white powder
Odor	odorless
Density	3.62 g/cm^{3}, solid
Melting point	1,455 °C (2,651 °F; 1,728 K) (decomposes)
Solubility in water	0.013 g/100 mL (25 °C)
Solubility in Organic solvents	insoluble
Solubility in acids	soluble

Hazards
- Occupational safety and health (OHS/OSH)
Main hazards	carcinogen
NFPA 704 (fire diamond)	4 0 0
Flash point	noncombustible
- Lethal dose or concentration (LD, LC)
LD_{50} (median dose)	20 mg/kg (rat, oral); 82 mg/kg (rat, oral); 74 mg/kg (mouse, oral); 50 mg/kg (rabbit, oral); 38 mg/kg (dog, oral)
- NIOSH (US health exposure limits)
PEL (Permissible)	TWA 0.010 mg/m^{3}
REL (Recommended)	Ca C 0.002 mg/m^{3} [15-minute]
IDLH (Immediate danger)	5 mg/m^{3} (as As)
- Except where otherwise noted, data are given for materials in their standard state (at 25 °C [77 °F], 100 kPa). verify (what is ?) Infobox references

Calcium arsenate is the inorganic compound with the formula Ca_{3}(AsO_{4})_{2}. A colourless salt, it was originally used as a pesticide and as a germicide. It is highly soluble in water, in contrast to lead arsenate, which makes it more toxic. Two minerals are hydrates of calcium arsenate: rauenthalite Ca_{3}(AsO_{4})_{2}·10H_{2}O and phaunouxite Ca_{3}(AsO_{4})_{2}·11H_{2}O. A related mineral is ferrarisite (Ca_{5}H_{2}(AsO_{4})_{4}·9H_{2}O.

== Preparation ==
Calcium arsenate is commonly prepared from disodium hydrogen arsenate and calcium chloride:

2 Na_{2}H[AsO_{4}] + 3 CaCl_{2} → 4 NaCl + Ca_{3}[AsO_{4}]_{2} + 2 HCl

In the 1920s, it was made in large vats by mixing calcium oxide and arsenic oxide. In the United States, 1360 metric tons were produced in 1919, 4540 in 1920, and 7270 in 1922. The composition of commercially available calcium arsenate varies from manufacturer to manufacturer. A typical composition is 80-85% of Ca_{3}(AsO_{4})_{2} a basic arsenate probably with a composition of 4CaO.As_{2}O_{5} together with calcium hydroxide and calcium carbonate.

== Use as a herbicide ==
It was once a common herbicide and insecticide. 38,000,000 kilograms were reported to be produced in 1942 alone, mainly for protection of cotton crops. Its high toxicity led the development of DDT.

=== Regulation ===
Calcium arsenate use is now banned in the UK, and its use is strictly regulated in the United States. It is currently the active ingredient in TURF-Cal manufactured by Mallinckrodt, it is one of the few herbicides – used mainly for the control of Poa annua and crabgrass- that hinders earthworm activity. Its label states that it will "reduce and inhibit earthworm activity and survival" and is only recommended against serious earthworm infestations in places such as golf course greens.

== Toxicity and regulation ==
Calcium arsenate is highly toxic, having both carcinogenic and systemic health effects. The Occupational Safety and Health Administration has set a permissible exposure limit at 0.01 mg/m^{3} over an eight-hour time-weighted average, while the National Institute for Occupational Safety and Health recommends a limit five times less (0.002 mg/m^{3}).

It is classified as an extremely hazardous substance in the United States as defined in Section 302 of the U.S. Emergency Planning and Community Right-to-Know Act (42 U.S.C. 11002), and is subject to strict reporting requirements by facilities which produce, store, or use it in significant quantities.

== Other natural occurrences ==
Weilite is the monohydrogenated counterpart, Ca(HAsO_{4}), while švenekite – the dihydrogenated one, Ca(H_{2}AsO_{4})_{2}. Hydrated analogues of weilite are haidingerite (monohydrate) and pharmacolite (dihydrate), with the latter name reflecting arsenic-related toxicity. Examples of more complex, hydrated Ca arsenates with some anions hydrogenated, are ferrarisite, guérinite, sainfeldite, vladimirite, and jeankempite.
