= Arsenic and Old Lace =

Arsenic and Old Lace may refer to:

- Arsenic and Old Lace (play), a 1941 play by Joseph Kesselring
  - Arsenic and Old Lace (film), a 1944 film adaptation directed by Frank Capra
  - Arsenic and Old Lace, a 1955 television adaptation for the anthology series The Best of Broadway
  - Arsenic & Old Lace, a 1962 Hallmark Hall of Fame television film
  - Arsenic and Old Lace, a 1969 ABC Movie of the Week remake directed by Robert Scheerer
- Arsenic and Old Lace (cocktail), a cocktail made with gin
- In Marvel Comics' Runaways, the character Gertrude Yorkes dubs herself and her dinosaur "Arsenic" and "Old Lace", respectively
