= Monosodium methyl arsonate =

Arsenic-based herbicide

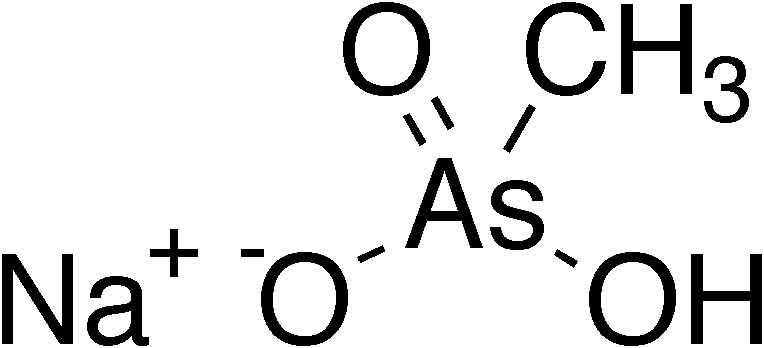

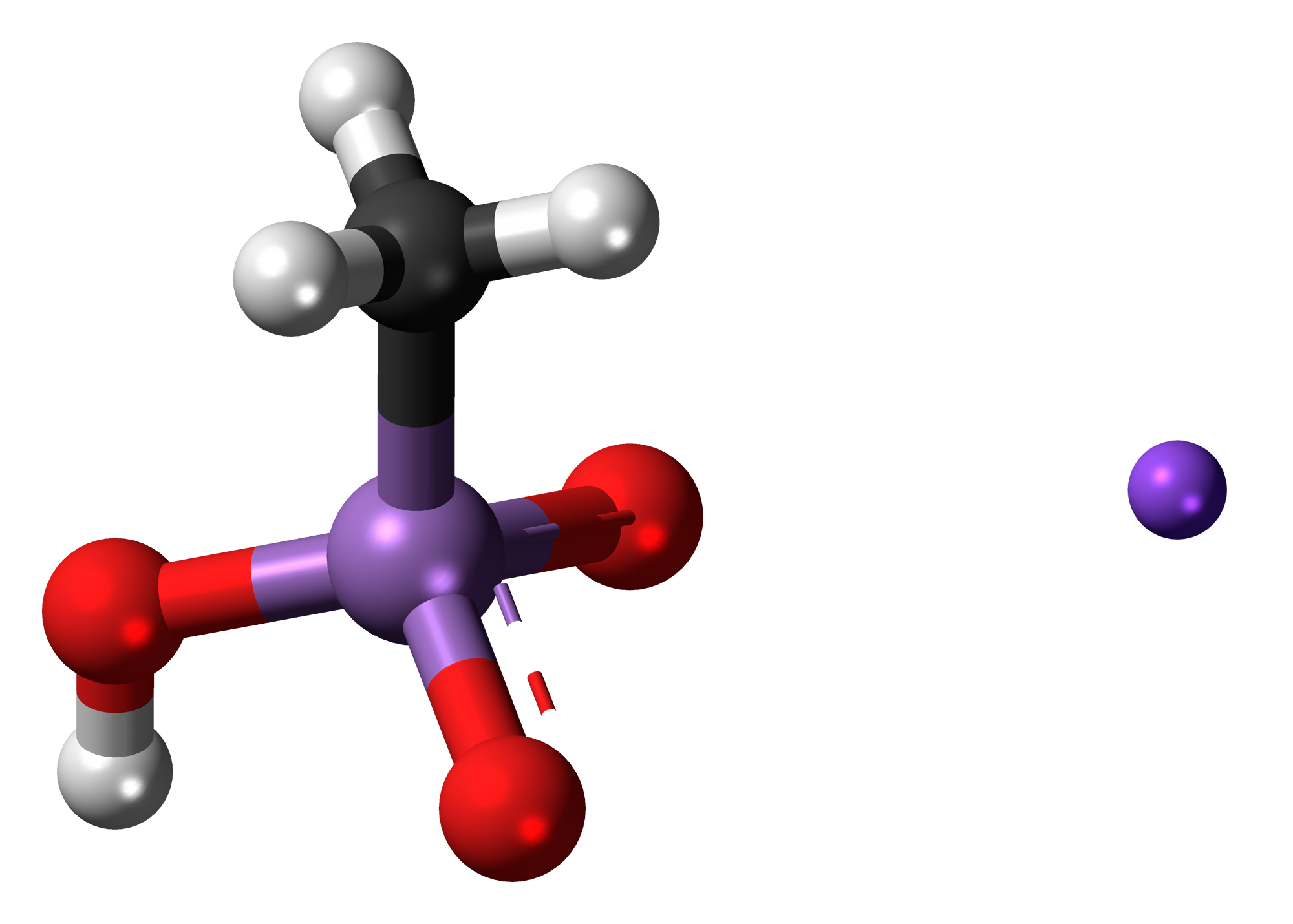

Names
- IUPAC name Sodium hydrogen methylarsonate
- Other names Monosodium methyl arsenate; sodium methylarsonate; monosodium methane arsonate; methyl arsonic acid monosodium salt; EPA Pesticide Chemical Code 013803

Identifiers
CAS Number	2163-80-6
3D model (JSmol)	Interactive image
Abbreviations	MSMA
ChemSpider	15697
ECHA InfoCard	100.016.815
PubChem CID	23664719
UNII	600QCW45IV
CompTox Dashboard (EPA)	DTXSID2025686
- InChI: InChI=1S/CH5AsO3.Na/c1-2(3,4)5;/h1H3,(H2,3,4,5);/q;+1/p-1 Key: JITOKQVGRJSHHA-UHFFFAOYSA-M; InChI=1/CH5AsO3.Na/c1-2(3,4)5;/h1H3,(H2,3,4,5);/q;+1/p-1 Key: JITOKQVGRJSHHA-REWHXWOFAY
- SMILES: C[As](=O)(O)[O-].[Na+]

Properties
Chemical formula	CH_{4}AsNaO_{3}
Molar mass	161.95 g/mol
- Except where otherwise noted, data are given for materials in their standard state (at 25 °C [77 °F], 100 kPa). verify (what is ?) Infobox references

Monosodium methyl arsenate (MSMA) is an arsenic-based herbicide. It is an organo-arsenate; less toxic than the inorganic form of arsenates. However, the EPA states that all forms of arsenic are a serious risk to human health and the United States' Agency for Toxic Substances and Disease Registry ranked arsenic as number 1 in its 2001 Priority List of Hazardous Substances at Superfund sites.

Arsenic is classified as a Group-A carcinogen. The EPA states that:

Arsenate (AsV) is the oxidized form and occurs in well-aerated soils, whereas in chemically-reduced soil environments, arsenite (AsIII) is the prevalent As form. Although arsenite is more toxic than arsenate, arsenate can also have deleterious effects on humans, plants, and microorganisms. Arsenic-contaminated soils pose serious risk to human health. The EPA also states that, while contaminated soil poses a serious risk to health, arsenic frequently mobilizes from soils and other sources, ending up in water where it is even more of a toxicity issue.

Trade names include:

- Target 6 Plus
- Target 6.6
- MSMA 6 Plus
- MSMA 6.6
