= Microbiology of Lyme disease =

Causes of tick-borne disease

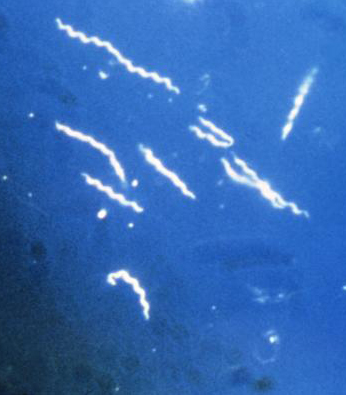
Borrelia burgdorferi one of the causative species of Lyme disease (borreliosis). Magnified 400 times.

Lyme disease, or borreliosis, is caused by spirochetal bacteria from the genus Borrelia, which has 52 known species. Three species (Borrelia garinii, Borrelia afzelii, and Borrelia burgdorferi s.s.) are the main causative agents of the disease in humans, while a number of others have been implicated as possibly pathogenic. Borrelia species in the species complex known to cause Lyme disease are collectively called Borrelia burgdorferi sensu lato (s.l.). The single species Borrelia burgdorferi sensu stricto (s.s.), a member of the complex, is responsible for nearly all cases of Lyme disease in North America.

Borrelia are microaerophilic and slow-growing. The primary reason for late diagnosis of Lyme disease is due to strain diversity. The species differ in clinical symptoms and presentation as well as geographic distribution.

Except for Borrelia recurrentis (which causes louse-borne relapsing fever and is transmitted by the human body louse), all known species are believed to be transmitted by ticks.

== Species and strains ==
Until recently, only three species were thought to cause Lyme disease: B. burgdorferi s.s. (the predominant species in North America, but also present in Europe); B. afzelii; and B. garinii (both predominant in Eurasia).

Thirteen distinct genomic classifications of Lyme disease bacteria have been identified worldwide. These include but are not limited to B. burgdorferi s.s., B. afzelii, B. garinii, B. valaisana, B. lusitaniae, B. andersoni (25015, DN127, CA55, 25015, HK501), B. miyamotoi, and B. japonica. Many of these genomic groups are country- or continent- specific. For example, without migration, B. japonica is only prevalent in the Eastern hemisphere.

The genomic variations have direct implications on the clinical symptoms of tick-borne Lyme disease. For example, the tick-borne Lyme disease caused by B. burgdorferi s.s. may manifest with arthritis-like symptoms. In contrast, B. garinii's tick-borne Lyme disease may cause an infection in the central nervous system.

=== Emerging genospecies ===
- B. valaisiana was identified as a genomic species from Strain VS116, and named B. valaisiana in 1997. It was later detected by polymerase chain reaction (PCR) in human cerebral spinal fluid (CSF) in Greece. B. valaisiana has been isolated throughout Europe, as well as East Asia.

Newly discovered genospecies have also been found to cause disease in humans:

- B. lusitaniae in Europe (especially Portugal), North Africa, and Asia.
- B. bissettii in the United States of America (USA or US) and Europe.
- B. spielmanii in Europe.

Additional B. burgdorferi s.l. genospecies suspected of causing illness, but not confirmed by culture, include B. japonica, B. tanukii, and B. turdae (Japan); B. sinica (China); and B. andersonii (US). Some of these species are carried by ticks not currently recognized as carriers of Lyme disease.

The B. miyamotoi spirochete, related to the relapsing fever group of spirochetes, is also suspected of causing illness in Japan. Spirochetes similar to B. miyamotoi have recently been found in both Ixodes ricinus ticks in Sweden and I. scapularis ticks in the US.

== Taxonomy ==
As of 2021, the B. burgdorferi s.l. species complex is known to include the following species:

- B. afzelii
- B. americana
- B. andersonii (proposed)
- B. bavariensis
- B. bissettiae
- B. burgdorferi s.s.
- B. californiensis
- B. carolinensis
- B. chilensis (proposed)
- B. finlandensis (proposed)
- B. garinii
- B. japonica
- B. kurtenbachii
- B. lanei
- B. lusitaniae
- B. maritima
- B. mayonii
- B. sinica
- B. spielmanii
- B. tanukii
- B. turdi
- B. valaisiana
- B. yangtzensis

As these species are mainly differentiated by genetics, they are usually referred to as genospecies.

== Epidemiology ==
Lyme disease is most endemic in the Northern Hemisphere temperate regions of the US, but sporadic cases have been described in other areas of the world. Lyme disease became a nationally notifiable condition according to the CDC in 1991.

The number of reported cases of borreliosis have been increasing, as are endemic regions in North America. Of cases reported to the US Centers for Disease Control and Prevention (CDC), the rate of Lyme disease infection is 7.9 cases for every 100,000 persons. In the 10 states where Lyme disease is most common, the average was 31.6 cases per 100,000 persons for 2005. Although Lyme disease has now been reported in 49 of 50 states in the US (all but Hawaii), about 99% of all reported cases are confined to just five geographic areas (New England, Mid-Atlantic, East-North Central, South Atlantic, and West North-Central). Recently, 89,000+ cases have been reported to the CDC via routine national surveillance in 2023. Beyond national surveillance, other methods suggest 476,000 treated and diagnosed with Lyme disease every year.

In Europe, cases of B. burgdorferi s.l.-infected ticks are found predominantly in Norway, Netherlands, Germany, France, Italy, Slovenia, and Poland, but have been isolated in almost every country on the continent. Lyme disease statistics for Europe can be found at Eurosurveillance website.

B. burgdorferi s.l.-infested ticks are being found more frequently in Japan, as well as in northwest China and far Eastern Russia. Borrelia has been isolated in Mongolia as well.

In South America, tick-borne disease recognition and occurrence is rising. Ticks carrying B. burgdorferi s.l., as well as canine and human tick-borne diseases, have been reported widely in Brazil, but the subspecies of Borrelia has not yet been defined. The first reported case of Lyme disease in Brazil was made in 1993 in São Paulo. B. burgdorferi s. s. antigens in patients have been identified in Colombia and in Bolivia. B. burgdorferi has been reported in the Bay Islands of Honduras.

In Northern Africa, B. burgdorferi s.s. has been identified in Morocco, Algeria, Egypt, and Tunisia.

In Western and sub-Saharan Africa, tick-borne relapsing fever has been recognized for over a century, since it was first isolated by the British physicians Joseph Everett Dutton and John Lancelot Todd in 1905. The manifestation of Borrelia as Lyme disease in this region is presently unknown, but evidence indicates that the disease may occur in humans in sub-Saharan Africa. The abundance of hosts and tick vectors would favor the occurrence of the infection in Africa. In East Africa, two cases of Lyme disease have been reported in Kenya.

In Australia, no definitive evidence exists for the existence of B. burgdorferi or for any other tick-borne spirochete that may be responsible for a local syndrome being reported as Lyme disease. Cases of neuroborreliosis have been documented in Australia, but are often ascribed to travel to other continents. The existence of Lyme disease in Australia is controversial.

== Lifecycle ==
The lifecycle of B. burgdorferi is complex, requiring ticks and species that are competent reservoirs, often small rodents. Mice are the primary reservoir for the bacteria.

Hard ticks have a variety of life histories with respect to optimizing their chance of contact with an appropriate host to ensure survival. The life stages of soft ticks are not readily distinguishable. The first stage to hatch from the egg, a six-legged larva, takes a blood meal from a host, and molts to the first nymphal stage. Unlike hard ticks, many soft ticks go through multiple nymphal stages, gradually increasing in size until the final molt to the adult stage.

The lifecycle of the black-legged tick, commonly called the deer tick (Ixodes scapularis) comprises four life stages: the egg, larva, nymph, and adult.

Whereas B. burgdorferi is mostly associated with deer ticks and the white-footed mouse, B. afzelli is most frequently detected in rodent-feeding vector ticks, and B. garinii and B. valaisiana appear to be associated with birds. Both rodents and birds are competent reservoir hosts for B. burgdorferi s.s.. The resistance of a genospecies of Lyme disease spirochetes to the bacteriolytic activities of the alternative complement system of various host species may determine its reservoir host association.

== Genomic characteristics ==
The genome of B. burgdorferi (strain B31) contains a linear chromosome of 910,725 base pairs and 853 genes. One of the most striking features of B. burgdorferi as compared with other bacteria is its unusual genome, which is far more complex than that of its spirochetal cousin Treponema pallidum, the agent of syphilis. In addition to a linear chromosome, the genome of B. burgdorferi strain B31 includes 21 plasmids (12 linear and 9 circular) – by far the largest number of plasmids found in any known bacterium. Genetic exchange, including plasmid transfers, contributes to the pathogenicity of the organism. Long-term culture of B. burgdorferi results in a loss of some plasmids and changes in expressed protein profiles. Associated with the loss of plasmids is a loss in the ability of the organism to infect laboratory animals, suggesting the plasmids encode key genes involved in virulence.

Chemical analysis of the external membrane of B. burgdorferi revealed the presence of 46% proteins, 51% lipids, and 3% carbohydrates.

== Structure and growth ==
B. burgdorferi is a highly specialized, motile, two-membrane, flat-waved spirochete, ranging from about 9 to 32 micrometers (μm) in length. Because of its double-membrane envelope, it is often mistakenly described as Gram negative, though it stains weakly in Gram stain. The bacterial membranes in at least strains B31, NL303, and N40 of B. burgdorferi do not contain lipopolysaccharide, which is extremely atypical for Gram negative bacteria; instead, the membranes contain glycolipids. However, the membranes in strain B31 have been found to contain a lipopolysaccharide-like component. B. burgdorferi is a microaerophilic organism, requiring little oxygen to survive. Unlike most bacteria, B. burgdorferi does not use iron, hence avoiding the difficulty of acquiring iron during infection. It lives primarily as an extracellular pathogen.

Like other spirochetes, such as Treponema pallidum (the agent of syphilis), B. burgdorferi has an axial filament composed of flagella that run lengthways between its cell wall and outer membrane. This structure allows the spirochete to move efficiently in a corkscrew fashion through viscous media, such as connective tissue.

B. burgdorferi is very slow growing, with a doubling time of 12–18 hours (in contrast to pathogens such as Streptococcus and Staphylococcus, which have a doubling time of 20–30 minutes).

=== Morphological variants ===
B. burgdorferi bacteria occasionally take on roughly spherical or other atypical shapes. These have sometimes been referred to as "cysts" or as "L-forms", but they appear not to be true microbial cysts and the cautious term "round bodies" is now preferred. They have occasionally been observed in tissue samples taken from erythema migrans rashes. In some in vitro experiments, round bodies seemed to be formed in response to adverse conditions, such as a culture medium containing no serum or antimicrobial drugs.

Advocates of the "chronic Lyme disease" theory sometimes propose that the formation of round bodies is a way that B. burgdorferi could survive standard antibiotic treatment protocols. However, a 2014 review found that there was currently no clear evidence for this, and noted that samples from patients diagnosed with chronic Lyme disease following antibiotic treatment usually showed no round bodies (and indeed often no spirochaetes), suggesting that their symptoms might be due to something other than surviving B. burgdorferi bacteria.

== Outer surface proteins ==
The outer membrane of B. burgdorferi is composed of various unique outer surface proteins (Osp) named OspA through OspF. Osp proteins are lipoproteins anchored by N-terminally attached fatty acid molecules to the membrane. They are presumed to play a role in virulence, transmission, or survival in the tick.

OspA, OspB, and OspD are expressed by B. burgdorferi residing in the gut of unfed ticks, suggesting they promote the persistence of the spirochete in ticks between blood meals. During transmission to the mammalian host, when the nymphal tick begins to feed and the spirochetes in the midgut begin to multiply rapidly, most spirochetes cease expressing OspA on their surfaces. Simultaneous with the disappearance of OspA, the spirochete population in the midgut begins to express an OspC and migrates to the salivary gland. Upregulation of OspC begins during the first day of feeding and peaks 48 hours after attachment.

The OspA and OspB genes encode the major outer membrane proteins of B. burgdorferi. The two Osp proteins show a high degree of sequence similarity, indicating a recent duplication event. Virtually all spirochetes in the midgut of an unfed nymph tick express OspA. OspA promotes the attachment of B. burgdorferi to the tick protein TROSPA, present on tick gut epithelial cells. OspB also has an essential role in the adherence of B. burgdorferi to the tick gut. Although OspD, as well as OspA and OspB, has been shown to bind to tick gut extracts in vitro it is not essential for the attachment and colonization of the tick gut, and it is not required for human infections.

OspC is a strong antigen; detection of its presence by the host organism stimulates an immune response. While each individual bacterial cell contains just one copy of the ospC gene, the genetic sequence of ospC among different strains within each of the three major Lyme disease species is highly variable. OspC plays an essential role during the early stage of mammalian infection. In infected ticks feeding on a mammalian host, OspC may also be necessary to allow B. burgdorferi to invade and attach to the salivary gland after leaving the gut, although not all studies agree on such a role for the protein. OspC attaches to the tick salivary protein Salp15, which protects the spirochete from complement and impairs the function of dendritic cells.

OspE and OspF were initially identified in B. burgdorferi strain N40. The ospE and ospF genes are structurally arranged in tandem as one transcriptional unit under the control of a common promoter. Individual strains of B. burgdorferi carry multiple related copies of the ospEF locus, which are now collectively referred to as Erp (OspE/F-like related protein) genes. In B. burgdoreri strains B31 and 297, most of the Erp loci occupy the same position on the multiple copies of the cp32 plasmid present in these strains. Each locus consists of one or two Erp genes. When two genes are present, they are transcribed as one operon, although in some cases, an internal promoter in the first gene may also transcribe the second gene. The presence of multiple Erp proteins was proposed to be important in allowing B. burgdorferi to evade killing by the alternative complement pathway of a broad range of potential animal hosts, as individual Erp proteins exhibited different binding patterns to the complement regulator factor H from different animals. However, the presence of factor H was recently demonstrated to be not necessary to enable B. burgdorferi to infect mice, suggesting that the Erp proteins have an additional function.

=== Antigenic variation and gene expression ===
Like the Borrelia that causes relapsing fever, B. burgdorferi has the ability to vary its surface proteins in response to immune attack. This ability is related to the genomic complexity of B. burgdorferi, and is another way that B. burgdorferi evades the immune system to establish a chronic infection.

== Mechanisms of persistence ==
B. burgdorferi is susceptible to a number of antibiotics in humans. However, untreated B. burgdorferi may persist in humans for months or years. In North America and Europe, Lyme arthritis may persist. In Europe, a persistent skin condition called acrodermatitis chronica atrophicans is also reported.
