= Borrelia coriaceae =

Scientific classification
- Domain: Bacteria
- Kingdom: Pseudomonadati
- Phylum: Spirochaetota
- Class: Spirochaetia
- Order: Spirochaetales
- Family: Borreliaceae
- Genus: Borrelia
- Species: B. coriaceae

Binomial name
- Borrelia coriaceae Johnson et al. 1987

Species of bacterium

Borrelia coriaceae is a species of spirochete bacteria and member of the genus Borrelia. Strains of this species have been isolated from the soft tick Ornithodoros coriaceus and from mule deer.

== Pathogenicity ==
B. coriaceae is a suspected pathogen in cattle, in which it is suspected to cause abortion (specifically, epizootic bovine abortion). The species is also closely related to other Borrelia species known to cause relapsing fever in humans.
