= Borrelia bissettii =

Scientific classification
- Domain: Bacteria
- Kingdom: Pseudomonadati
- Phylum: Spirochaetota
- Class: Spirochaetia
- Order: Spirochaetales
- Family: Borreliaceae
- Genus: Borrelia
- Species: B. bissettiae

Binomial name
- Borrelia bissettiae Gupta 2019

Species of bacterium

Borrelia bissettiae (formerly B. bissettii, before renaming in 2019) is a spirochete bacterium. The type strain is strain DN127. It is pathogenic and causes Lyme borreliosis in the Americas and Eurasia.

== See also ==
- Lyme disease microbiology
