= Borrelia mayonii =

Scientific classification
- Domain: Bacteria
- Kingdom: Pseudomonadati
- Phylum: Spirochaetota
- Class: Spirochaetia
- Order: Spirochaetales
- Family: Borreliaceae
- Genus: Borrelia
- Species: B. mayonii

Binomial name
- Borrelia mayonii Pritt et al. 2016

Tick-borne bacterium

Borrelia mayonii is a Gram-negative, host-associated spirochete that is capable of causing Lyme disease. This organism can infect various vertebrate hosts such as humans via the bite of a black legged tick.

== Phylogenetic information ==
Borrelia mayonii was identified as a sensu lato (broad sense), genospecies (Bbsl) of the known microbe, Borrelia burgdorferi. A genospecies is a cluster of organisms with similar core genes that usually does not undergo genetic recombination with diverged organisms. Two isolates, gene strains, of B. mayonii, named MN14-1420 and MN14-1539, were sequenced, process of arranging a chain of genetic information to match up to a specific organism's genetic code, and compared to the genome or genetic material of Borrelia burgdorferi. With a nucleotide similarity of 93.83% in the linear chromosome compared to other known genospecies, B. mayonii can be considered a new genospecies (Bbsl).

== Discovery ==
Borrelia mayonii is a bacterial genospecies discovered in the Midwestern United States by Pritt and colleagues at the Mayo Clinic in Minnesota during routine polymerase chain reaction (PCR) of the oppA1 gene of B. burgdorferi in 2016. According to Pritt, six samples were atypical and did not resemble any known species. These atypical microorganisms were later named after the Mayo Clinic as a new genospecies. The spirochaete, a flexible and spiral twist bacterium, was also detected in the blood of infected individuals using PCR and microscopy and was cultivated or grown in a modified Barbour-Stoenner-Kelly (BSK) plate, a microbial growth plate consisting of bovine serum albumin and rabbit serum, at 34 °C under oxygen levels lower than that of normal atmospheric conditions, centrifuged at 8000 X g for 10 minutes, isolated using Qiagen DNA kit, and washed using dH_{2}O.

This genospecies has the potential to cause Lyme disease (Lyme borreliosis).

== Genomics ==
The B. mayonii genome is about 1.31 megabase pairs (Mbp) with an average 26.9% GC (guanine and cytosine) content. It has a linear chromosome with an additional 15 plasmids, eight linear and seven circular. The genomes of the two isolates have similar plasmids seen in Borrelia burgdorferi. The MN14-1420 isolate have a vls locus, a specific position on a chromosome, consisting of 24 silent cassettes, a mobile gene that floats around. B. burgdorferi has 15 silent cassettes with a vlsE expression site. The vls locus with the vlsE site, as it is present in strain B. burgdorferi B31, encodes a lipoprotein, a fatty protein, that allows B. burgdorferi to infect various mammalian hosts. B. mayonii may also use this locus as a mechanism of evading host immune system. However, the isolates lack various genomic regions seen in B. burgdorferi such as the region that codes for CspZ (complement inhibitor) and BB_K32 (fibronectin binding protein).

== Metabolism ==
Since this organism is an obligate parasite, its metabolism outside of the host is unclear. However, B. mayonii has genes for purine salvage, a type of nucleotide salvage, and metabolism, but its use of these genes is unknown. According to Integrated Microbial Genomes System, this parasite has genes that allow this organism to synthesize various amino acids such as L-alanine, L-glutamate, glycine, L-asparagine, and L-glutamine.

== Disease ==
Infection by B. mayonii is transferred from the bite of Ixodes scapularis, which is also called black legged tick or deer tick. B. mayonii causes Lyme disease like B. burgdorferi, with the symptoms of fever, headache, rash, neck pain, and arthritis. However, B. mayonii also has additional symptoms differentiating it from B. burgdorferi, such as nausea, vomiting, macular rash, and neurological symptoms. To identify infection with B. mayonii, blood smears, slides with blood samples on them for use with a microscope, may be used. Mayonii spirochetes in blood smears indicate a positive infection for Lyme disease caused by B. mayonii. Additionally, PCR testing may be used. To treat this infection, the current drug of choice is doxycycline, an antibiotic, over a 2- to 4-week course.
