= Borrelia parkeri =

Scientific classification
- Domain: Bacteria
- Kingdom: Pseudomonadati
- Phylum: Spirochaetota
- Class: Spirochaetia
- Order: Spirochaetales
- Family: Borreliaceae
- Genus: Borrelia
- Species: B. parkeri

Binomial name
- Borrelia parkeri (Davis, 1942) Steinhaus, 1946

Species of bacterium

Borrelia parkeri, a species of Borrelia, has been associated with relapsing fever.
