= Borrelia hispanica =

Scientific classification
- Domain: Bacteria
- Kingdom: Pseudomonadati
- Phylum: Spirochaetota
- Class: Spirochaetia
- Order: Spirochaetales
- Family: Borreliaceae
- Genus: Borrelia
- Species: B. hispanica

Binomial name
- Borrelia hispanica Sergent & Foley 1910

Species of bacterium

Borrelia hispanica is a species of spirochete bacterium in the genus Borrelia that causes tick-borne relapsing fever in humans. It is transmitted primarily by soft ticks of the genus Ornithodoros, particularly Ornithodoros erraticus, and is endemic to parts of North America and the Mediterranean region, including Spain and Morocco.

== Morphology ==
Like other members of the genus, B. hispanica is a slender, helically coiled bacterium with periplasmic flagella located between the outer membrane and the peptidoglycan layer. These axial filaments enables corkscrew motility, which facilitates movement through viscous environments such as blood and connective tissue.

Like other Borrelia species, B. hispanica possesses an outer membrane and periplasmic flagella and stains poorly with standard Gram staining. Alternative methods of visualizing the bacterium include dark-field microscopy or Giemsa staining.

== Genomics ==
The genome of B. hispanica is characterized by a linear chromosome and a variable number of linear and circular plasmids. These plasmids encode surface-exposed lipoproteins involved in antigenic variation, a key mechanism underlying relapsing fever.

== Transmission and vector ==
B. hispanica is transmitted to humans by soft ticks of the genus Ornithodoros, most commonly O. erraticus. These ticks inhabit rodent burrows, caves, and cracks in walls or floors of dwellings, particularly in rural areas.

== Epidemiology ==
B. hispanica is an Old World relapsing fever agent found primarily in North Africa and parts of southern Europe. Endemic regions include Morocco, Algeria, and Spain.

== Pathogenesis ==
Relapsing fever borreliae are able to evade host immune responses through antigenic variation of surface lipoproteins. This process, which has been well characterized in species such as Borrelia hermsii, involves sequential expression of different antigenic variants, allowing persistence in the host and resulting in recurrent febrile episodes.

Clinical manifestations include:

- Recurrent fever
- Headache
- Myalgia and arthralgia
- Nausea and vomiting
- Hepatosplenomegaly (in some cases)

== Diagnosis ==
Diagnosis tick-born relapsing fever can be made by detection of spirochetes in peripheral blood during febrile episodes using light microscopy with stained blood smears. Light microscopy alone is unable to visually differentiate between spirochetes due to their similar morphology.

Molecular methods such as polymerase chain reaction (PCR) can provide a more sensitive detection and allow species-level identification, which may be important in areas where multiple relapsing fever borreliae are endemic.

Serologic testing is less commonly used due to the cross-reactivity among Borrelia species.

== Treatment ==
Tick-borne relapsing fever associated with B. hispanica is generally treated with antibiotics such as doxycycline and tetracycline. Alternative antibiotics, such as penicillin or erythromycin, may be used when tetracyclines are contraindicated.

== Prevention ==
Prevention focuses on reducing exposure to infected soft ticks. Measures include improving housing conditions, avoiding tick-infested environments, and controlling rodent reservoirs.
