= Borrelia anserina =

Scientific classification
- Domain: Bacteria
- Kingdom: Pseudomonadati
- Phylum: Spirochaetota
- Class: Spirochaetia
- Order: Spirochaetales
- Family: Borreliaceae
- Genus: Borrelia
- Species: B. anserina

Binomial name
- Borrelia anserina Sakharoff 1891; Bergey et al. 1925

Species of bacterium

Borrelia anserina is a helical spirochete bacterium with dimensions around 8-20/0,2-0,3 μm and with five to eight spirals. Their mobility is very high. B. anserina can be colored with the May Grunwald-Giemsa method.

== Cultivation ==
In microbiological laboratories, B. anserina bacteria can be grown on special protein-enriched media (rich in ovoalbumins or animal tissue (that contains myoglobin)), in anaerobic conditions. They can also be grown in embryonic chicken eggs. The laboratory cultivation of B. anserina is rarely done and constitutes a diagnostic method in bird borreliosis and spirochetosis. B. anserina used to be maintained in embryonic chicken eggs or by serial passages in domestic chickens until in 1986 it was discovered that it could be cultivated in Barbour-Stoenner-Kelly (BSK) medium, which facilitated and made future research more cost-effective.

== Pathogenity ==
B. anserina is a pathogenic agent for poultry (chickens, turkeys, ducks etc.) and causes a disease called borreliosis or spirochetosis. This bacterium is transmitted from bird to bird by ticks from the Argas and Ornitodorus genera. The major symptoms of an infection with B. anserina are: anemia, diarrhea, and severe neurological dysfunctions.
