= Borrelia kurtenbachii =

Scientific classification
- Domain: Bacteria
- Kingdom: Pseudomonadati
- Phylum: Spirochaetota
- Class: Spirochaetia
- Order: Spirochaetales
- Family: Borreliaceae
- Genus: Borrelia
- Species: B. kurtenbachii

Binomial name
- Borrelia kurtenbachii Margos et al. 2011

Species of bacterium

Borrelia kurtenbachii is a spirochete bacterium; it can be pathogenic, being involved in cases of Lyme borreliosis.

== See also ==
- Lyme disease microbiology
