= Borrelia andersonii =

Scientific classification
- Domain: Bacteria
- Kingdom: Pseudomonadati
- Phylum: Spirochaetota
- Class: Spirochaetia
- Order: Spirochaetales
- Family: Borreliaceae
- Genus: Borrelia
- Species: B. andersonii

Binomial name
- Borrelia andersonii Marconi et al. 1995

Species of bacterium

Borrelia andersonii is a spirochete bacterium. It can be pathogenic, being involved in cases of Lyme borreliosis.

== See also ==
- Lyme disease microbiology
