= Borrelia lusitaniae =

Scientific classification
- Domain: Bacteria
- Kingdom: Pseudomonadati
- Phylum: Spirochaetota
- Class: Spirochaetia
- Order: Spirochaetales
- Family: Borreliaceae
- Genus: Borrelia
- Species: B. lusitaniae

Binomial name
- Borrelia lusitaniae Le Fleche et al., 1997

Species of bacterium

Borrelia lusitaniae is a bacterium of the spirochete class of the genus Borrelia, which has a diderm (double-membrane) envelope. It is a part of the Borrelia burgdorferi sensu lato genospecies and is a Gram-negative bacterium. B. lusitaniae is tick-borne; the type strain is PotiB2. It can be pathogenic, being involved in cases of Lyme borreliosis. A species of tick, Ixodes ricinus, is the host of B. lusitaniae. It is thought to have originated from Portugal and has since spread to parts of Europe and North Africa. Lizards of the family Lacertidae are now believed to be important reservoir hosts of this bacterium.

== Origin and distribution ==
While B. lusitaniae is distributed throughout countries in Europe and North Africa, it is the sole species of the Lyme borreliosis group in southern Portugal. Lizards of the family Lacertidae are believed to be important reservoir hosts of B. lusitaniae. They were first isolated in Portugal in 1993. These lizards that include the sand lizard and common wall lizard are known to be highly structured phylogeographically. Migration is very limited between the lizard populations from different localities and it has shed light into the evolution and epidemiology of B. lusitaniae. The pronounced population structure of B. lusitaniae over a short geographic distance (southern Portugal) by housekeeping genes indicates that the migration rates of B. lusitaniae are rather low, because the distribution of Mediterranean lizard populations is highly parapatric.

Different populations of B. lusitaniae are known. Seven strains of B. lusitaniae sp. nov. have been isolated from Ixodes ricinus ticks in Portugal, the Czech Republic, Moldavia, Ukraine, and Belarus. Local populations have diverged through vicariance, because climate change after the last ice age generated ecological barriers between Mafra and Grândola. In more northern or eastern countries, B. lusitaniae has been detected at only a few sites, at which it infects ticks less frequently than it does on the Mediterranean coast, although in Morocco and Tunisia, 96.6-100% of the Borrelia species present were B. lusitaniae.

== In lizards ==
Because lizards are considered important reservoir hosts of B. lusitaniae, their limited dispersal affects the migration rates of B. lusitaniae. This results in the fine-scale geographic structure of this tick-borne bacterium. Although I. ricinus ticks infected with B. lusitaniae may be dispersed rapidly over long distances when feeding on mobile hosts, such as migratory birds, this is unlikely to be an important process in the effective dispersal of B. lusitaniae. Feeding tick larvae apparently do not acquire B. lusitaniae from vertebrate species other than lizards. However, B. lusitaniae-infected nymphs that feed on long-distance migrants give rise to hunting adult ticks that subsequently feed on larger animals, such as deer, which are not reservoir-competent for any of the species of the Lyme borreliosis group of spirochetes. Therefore, only larvae and nymphs that feed on lizards maintain the cycles of B. lusitaniae. So, the migration rates of B. lusitaniae are determined by those of lizards.

== In humans ==
To date, the reservoir of B. lusitaniae has not been fully defined, and little is known about the ecology of this genospecies. It is known to cause experimental disease in mouse models, suggesting that some strains could also be connected with human Lyme borreliosis. The first known isolate of Borrelia was in Portugal. A 46-year-old woman from the Lisbon area presented with skin lesions on her left thigh that had persisted about 10 years. Molecular analysis of the patient isolate allowed the classification of the strain to B. lusitaniae, a genospecies previously thought to be nonpathogenic in humans The woman had a weak serological response, which is present in a high percentage of patients with unspecific and long-lasting skin manifestations. This suggests a clinical pattern for B. lusitaniae different from those for other Borrelia spp. in the Portuguese population compared to date .

== Plasmids ==
The plasmid profiles of B. lusitaniae strains usually range from 19 to 76 kb. In the case of B. lusitaniae, the number of plasmids is quite low and the species lacks all the small plasmids described for the other Borrelia species with medical importance in Lyme borreliosis. Because most of the Borrelia virulence genes are located on plasmids, including genes that encode for OspC, Erps, and CRASP proteins, the low number of these genetic elements in B. lusitaniae strains could be associated with the lower infectivity reported for this species since only two human isolates have been found so far. Furthermore, the number (0.04/100,000 inhabitants) of reported cases in Portugal is not as high as in other European countries despite a high reported infection prevalence of B. lusitaniae in ticks.
