= Borrelia texasensis =

Scientific classification (Candidatus)
- Domain: Bacteria
- Kingdom: Pseudomonadati
- Phylum: Spirochaetota
- Class: Spirochaetia
- Order: Spirochaetales
- Family: Borreliaceae
- Genus: Borrelia
- Species: "Ca. B. texasensis"

Binomial name
- "Candidatus Borrelia texasensis" Lin et al. 2005

Synonyms
- Borreliella texasensis

Species of prokaryote

"Candidatus Borrelia texasensis" is a proposed new species of the spirochaete Borrelia. Ca. B. texasensis was "isolated in March 1998 from an adult male Dermacentor variabilis tick feeding on a coyote from Webb County, Texas." According to the discovering researchers from Georgia Southern University's Institute of Arthropodology and Parasitology, "It differs from other borreliae based on the banding patterns obtained by randomly amplified polymorphic DNA (RAPD) analysis" along with several other variations including morphological changes identified under electron microscope. The researchers were "unable to revive frozen cultures, so cannot meet the requirements of the Bacteriological Code to deposit viable type material at two different culture collections" leading to the use of the candidatus prefix.
