= Borrelia afzelii =

Scientific classification
- Domain: Bacteria
- Kingdom: Pseudomonadati
- Phylum: Spirochaetota
- Class: Spirochaetia
- Order: Spirochaetales
- Family: Borreliaceae
- Genus: Borrelia
- Species: B. afzelii

Binomial name
- Borrelia afzelii Manuela Marin Canica et al., 1994

Species of bacterium

Borrelia afzelii is a species of Borrelia endemic to parts of Eurasia where it is one of the causative agents of Lyme disease. It is transmitted by hard-bodied ticks of the Ixodes genus (Ixodes ricinus in Europe, and Ixodes persulcatus in temperate regions of Asia), infecting various wild mammals in nature.

Among 30 Borrelia known species, it is one of four which are likely to infect humans. Dermatological manifestations are more common in Lyme disease caused by B. afzelii.

It is named after Swedish dermatologist Arvid Afzelius.

== See also ==
- Lyme disease
