= Borrelia valaisiana =

Scientific classification
- Domain: Bacteria
- Kingdom: Pseudomonadati
- Phylum: Spirochaetota
- Class: Spirochaetia
- Order: Spirochaetales
- Family: Borreliaceae
- Genus: Borrelia
- Species: B. valaisiana

Binomial name
- Borrelia valaisiana Wang et al., 1997

Species of bacterium

Borrelia valaisiana is a spirochaete bacterium; strain VS116 is the type strain. It is a potential pathogen.
