= Borrelia garinii =

Scientific classification
- Domain: Bacteria
- Kingdom: Pseudomonadati
- Phylum: Spirochaetota
- Class: Spirochaetia
- Order: Spirochaetales
- Family: Borreliaceae
- Genus: Borrelia
- Species: B. garinii

Binomial name
- Borrelia garinii Baranton et al. 1992

Species of bacterium

Borrelia garinii is a species of spirochete bacterium in the genus Borrelia. It is endemic to parts of Eurasia where it is one of the causative organisms of human Lyme disease. It is transmitted by hard-bodied ticks of the Ixodes genus (Ixodes ricinus in Europe, and Ixodes persulcatus in temperate regions of Asia), infecting various wild woodland mammals.

Neurological complications are more frequent in human Lyme disease caused by this Borrelia species.
