= Borrelia spielmanii =

Scientific classification
- Domain: Bacteria
- Kingdom: Pseudomonadati
- Phylum: Spirochaetota
- Class: Spirochaetia
- Order: Spirochaetales
- Family: Borreliaceae
- Genus: Borrelia
- Species: B. spielmanii

Binomial name
- Borrelia spielmanii Richter et al. 2006

Species of bacterium

Borrelia spielmanii is a spirochete bacterium; it routinely infects Ixodes ricinus, and subsequently humans, causing Lyme disease.
