= Borrelia miyamotoi =

Scientific classification
- Domain: Bacteria
- Kingdom: Pseudomonadati
- Phylum: Spirochaetota (Spirochaetes)
- Class: Spirochaetia
- Order: Spirochaetales
- Family: Borreliaceae
- Genus: Borrelia
- Species: B. miyamotoi

Binomial name
- Borrelia miyamotoi Fukunaga et al. 1995

Species of bacterium

Borrelia miyamotoi is a bacterium of the spirochete phylum in the genus Borrelia. A zoonotic organism, B. miyamotoi can infect humans through the bite of several species of hard-shell Ixodes ticks, the same kind of ticks that spread B. burgdorferi, the causative bacterium of Lyme disease. Ixodes ticks are also the primary vector in the spread of babesiosis and anaplasmosis.

B. miyamotoi causes Borrelia miyamotoi disease (BMD) in humans. BMD is a relapsing fever illness that has been reported across the world, often in the same geographic areas where Lyme disease is endemic. Treatment currently follows that of Lyme disease.

== Microbiology ==
=== History and morphology ===
B. miyamotoi was discovered in 1995 when it was isolated from a population of Ixodes persulcates ticks on the Japanese island of Hokkaido. The organism was named for Kenji Miyamoto, who initially discovered Borrellia spirochetes in Japan. It was first detected in the United States in 2001.

B. miyamotoi is a gram-negative, anaerobic, obligate parasitic bacterium with a spiraling corkscrew shape.

=== Genetics ===
The bacterial genome is physically made up of one linear chromosome, twelve linear plasmids, and two circular plasmids, which encode a total of 1362 genes. Four distinct genotypes of B. miyamotoi have been demonstrated based on examples isolated from Asia, Europe, and North America.

Borrelia species that cause human disease are classified into two genetic clades, the Lyme borreliosis (LB) clade, and the relapsing fever (RF) clade. B. miyamotoi is a member of the relapsing fever (RF) clade. The glpQ gene and its resulting GlpQ protein are conserved in the RF clade of Borrelia, which makes it possible to distinguish them from LB group Borrellia in testing.

=== Transmission ===
Unlike B. burgdorferi, B. miyamotoi exhibits transovarial transmission, whereby the bacterium is passed from an adult tick directly into the eggs of new larvae within the ovaries. This mode of transmission has implications for diagnosis of disease because a very small larva can attach to a human host and go undetected.

=== Virulence factors ===
B. miyamotoi employs antigenic variation and variable membrane proteins (VMPs) that help it to evade the human immune system. It is also known to evade components of the complement cascade, part of innate immune system, which mounts the initial response to an infection.

== Disease ==
=== History ===
Borellia miyamotoi disease (BMD) in humans was first described in Russia in 2011, then subsequently in Japan, China, North America, Western Europe, and Asia.

=== Reservoirs ===
Several variations of mice and voles are known rodent reservoirs for B. miyamotoi, including Apodemus spp., Myodes glareolus, and Peromyscus leucopus. There is also some preliminary evidence for various avian and several large animal reservoirs such as wild boar and deer.

=== Vector ===
The primary vector for B. miyamotoi transmission is the hard-shell Ixodes tick. Specific species of the tick have been identified in different parts of the world.

Ixodes species by region
Region	Species
China, Japan, Russia	Ixodes persulcatus
Japan, Russia	Ixodes pavlovski
Southeast Asia	Ixodes ovatus
United States	Ixodes scapularis
United States (California)	Ixodes pacificus
Western Europe	Ixodes ricinus

=== Clinical presentation ===
BMD presents approximately two weeks after infection with non-specific flu-like symptoms including a relapsing-remitting fever in excess of 40C (104F), malaise, myalgias (muscle pain), arthralgias (joint pain), nausea, vomiting, and headache. Some patients may have elevated liver transaminases, thrombocytopenia, and leukopenia. Cases involving an erythema migrans rash, which is a classic feature of Lyme disease, have been reported, but are believed to likely be the result of co-infection with B. burgdorferi and the development of co-morbid Lyme disease. B. miyamotoi has also demonstrated a slower onset neurological syndrome including meningitis in some immunocompromised patients.

Since ticks in all phases of their life cycle, including very small larvae, can transmit the disease to humans, the bite and tick can easily go undetected. B. miyamotoi also transmits faster than B. burgdorferi, often within 24 hours of tick attachment.

=== Diagnosis ===
Polymerase chain reaction (PCR) tests are available for Borrelia miyamotoi. PCR tests targeting the 16S ribosomal DNA, fla, or p66 genes have been used in specialized labs. PCR for the glpQ gene can be used to rule out Lyme disease since LB clade Borrelia species don't contain it. However, a positive test doesn't necessarily indicate B. miyamotoi infection, because the glpQ gene exists in all RF clade Borrelia species.

An investigational method of detection involving combined serologic testing for IgG and IgM antibodies against both the GlpQ and VMP proteins has recently shown high sensitivity and specificity.

=== Treatment ===
Antibiotics used for Lyme disease are generally recommended for BMD. Though no prospective studies nor formal guidelines have been developed, these antibiotics have been reported to be effective. Doxycycline or ceftriaxone are usually recommended. A possible resistance to amoxicillin was noted in an in vitro study, but the significance for humans is unknown. The Jarisch–Herxheimer reaction has been noted at the start of antibiotic treatment for BMD.
