= Borrelia carolinensis =

Scientific classification
- Domain: Bacteria
- Kingdom: Pseudomonadati
- Phylum: Spirochaetota
- Class: Spirochaetia
- Order: Spirochaetales
- Family: Borreliaceae
- Genus: Borrelia
- Species: B. carolinensis

Binomial name
- Borrelia carolinensis Rudenko et al. 2011

Species of bacterium

Borrelia carolinensis is a spirochete bacterium associated with Lyme disease. The species was first described in the Southeast region of the United States.
