= Borrelia japonica =

Scientific classification
- Domain: Bacteria
- Kingdom: Pseudomonadati
- Phylum: Spirochaetota
- Class: Spirochaetia
- Order: Spirochaetales
- Family: Borreliaceae
- Genus: Borrelia
- Species: B. japonica

Binomial name
- Borrelia japonica Kawabata, Masuzawa & Yanagihara, 1993

Species of bacterium

Borrelia japonica is a spirochete bacterium first isolated from Japanese mammals.
