= Borrelia tanukii =

Scientific classification
- Domain: Bacteria
- Kingdom: Pseudomonadati
- Phylum: Spirochaetota
- Class: Spirochaetia
- Order: Spirochaetales
- Family: Borreliaceae
- Genus: Borrelia
- Species: B. tanukii

Binomial name
- Borrelia tanukii Fukunaga et al., 1996

Species of bacterium

Borrelia tanukii is a spirochete bacterium first isolated from specimens of Ixodes tanuki, hence its name.
