= Borrelia turdi =

Scientific classification
- Domain: Bacteria
- Kingdom: Pseudomonadati
- Phylum: Spirochaetota
- Class: Spirochaetia
- Order: Spirochaetales
- Family: Borreliaceae
- Genus: Borrelia
- Species: B. turdi

Binomial name
- Borrelia turdi Fukunaga et al., 1996

Species of bacterium

Borrelia turdi, formerly known as Borrelia turdae, is a spirochete bacterium first isolated from specimens of Ixodes tanuki. Its name refers to its reservoir, Turdus merula.
