= Borrelia sinica =

Scientific classification
- Domain: Bacteria
- Kingdom: Pseudomonadati
- Phylum: Spirochaetota (Spirochaetes)
- Class: Spirochaetia
- Order: Spirochaetales
- Family: Borreliaceae
- Genus: Borrelia
- Species: B. sinica

Binomial name
- Borrelia sinica Masuzawa et al. 2001

Species of bacterium

Borrelia sinica is a spirochete bacterium. Its cells contain only four periplasmic flagella inserted at each end of the spirochaetes, differing from other Borrelia species. It is associated with Lyme disease. CMN3^{T} is the type strain of this species.
