= Cristispira =

Scientific classification
- Domain: Bacteria
- Kingdom: Pseudomonadati
- Phylum: Spirochaetota
- Class: Spirochaetia
- Order: Spirochaetales
- Family: Borreliaceae
- Genus: Cristispira; Gross 1910

Type species
- "Cristispira pectinis" Gross 1910

Species
- "C. anodontae" (Keysselitz 1906) Gross 1912; "C. balbiani" (Certes 1882) Gross 1910; "C. interrogationis" Gross 1910; C. pectinis Gross 1910; "C. pinnae" Gonder 1908) Gross 1910

Genus of bacteria

Cristispira is a genus of bacteria of the spirochaete phylum. They are known as large spirochetes. They are characterized by the host species in which they reside. They are known as harmless parasites of freshwater and marine molluscs and gastropods. They have an unusually large number of periplasmic flagella.

== Morphology ==
They are differentiated from other spirochetes by the presence of a crestlike structure called the crista. Their cell bodies are flexible. The cell diameter is 28 to 120 micrometers. They are actively motile.

== See also ==
- List of bacterial orders
- List of bacteria genera
