= Arvid Afzelius =

Swedish dermatologist

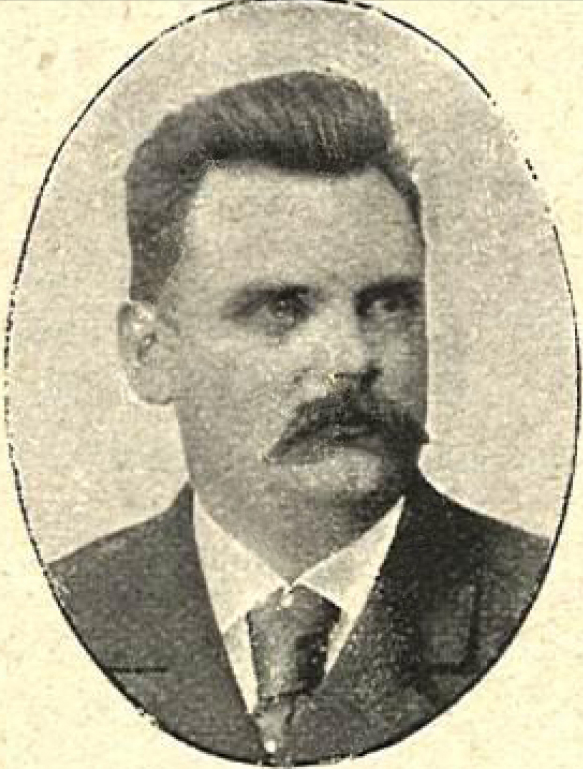
- Born: 1857
- Died: 1923 (aged 65–66)
- Medical career
- Profession: Dermatologist

Arvid Afzelius (Swedish pronunciation: [ˈǎrːvɪd afˈsěːlɪɵs]) (1857–1923) was a Swedish dermatologist.

As a student at the Karolinska institutet, Afzelius studied under the prominent dermatologist Moritz Kaposi (1837–1902) in Vienna. Kaposi has now become a household name because "his" sarcoma is a common lesion in the acquired immunodeficiency syndrome.

In a 1909 meeting of the Swedish Society of Dermatology, Arvid Afzelius presented research about an expanding, ring like lesion he had observed. Afzelius published his work 12 years later and speculated that the rash came from the bite of an Ixodes tick. This rash, now known as erythema migrans, is an early indication of Lyme disease.

Borrelia afzelii, one of the Borrelia species that is an agent of Lyme disease, is named in his honor.

== Bibliography ==
- Verhandlungen der dermatologischen Gesellschaft zu Stockholm. Archiv für Dermatologie und Syphilis, Berlin, 1910, 101: 104.
- Erythema chronicum migrans. Acta Dermato-Venereologica, Stockholm, 1921, 2: 120–125.
