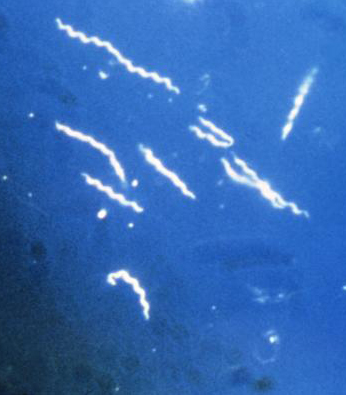
- Borrelia burgdorferi the causative agent of Lyme disease (borreliosis) magnified 400 times

Scientific classification
- Domain: Bacteria
- Kingdom: Pseudomonadati
- Phylum: Spirochaetota
- Class: Spirochaetia
- Order: Spirochaetales
- Family: Borreliaceae
- Genus: Borrelia; Swellengrebel, 1907

Type species
- Borrelia gallinara (Sakharoff 1891) Bergey et al. 1925

Species
- See text

Synonyms
- Borreliella Adeolu & Gupta 2015; "Cacospira" Enderlein 1917; Spironema Bergy et al. 1923 non Vuillemin 1905 non Klebs 1892 non Léger & Hesse 1922 non Rafinesque 1838 non Hochst. 1842 non Lindley 1840 non Meek 1864; "Spiroschaudinnia" Sambon 1907

= Borrelia =

Genus of bacteria

Borrelia is a genus of bacteria of the spirochete phylum. Several species cause Lyme disease, also called Lyme borreliosis, a zoonotic, vector-borne disease transmitted by ticks. Other species of Borrelia cause relapsing fever, and are transmitted by ticks or lice, depending on the species of bacteria.

The genus is named after French biologist Amédée Borrel (1867–1936), who first documented the distinction between a species of Borrelia anserina and the other known type of spirochete at the time, Treponema pallidum. This bacterium must be viewed using dark-field microscopy, which make the cells appear white against a dark background. Borrelia species are grown in Barbour-Stoenner-Kelly medium.

Of 52 known species of Borrelia, 20 are members of the Lyme disease group (with an additional 3 proposed), 29 belong to the relapsing fever group, and two are members of a genetically distinct third group typically found in reptiles. A proposal has been made to split the Lyme disease group based on genetic diversity and move them to their own genus, Borelliella, but this change is not widely accepted. This bacterium uses hard and soft ticks and lice as vectors. Testing for the presence of the bacteria in a human includes two-tiered serological testing, including immunoassays and immunoblotting.

A few Borrelia species as "Candidatus Borrelia mahuryensis" harbor intermediate genetic features between Lyme disease and relapsing fever Borrelia.

== Biology ==
Borrelia species are members of the family Spirochaetaceae, so present the characteristic spirochete (spiral) shape. Most species are obligate anaerobes, although some are aerotolerant. Borrelia species have an outer membrane that contains a substance similar to lipopolysaccharides, an inner membrane, and a layer of peptidoglycan in a periplasmic space, which classifies them as Gram-negative. However, this result is not easily visualized using Gram staining. They are typically 20–30 μm long and 0.2–0.3 μm wide.

Spirochetes move using axial filaments called endoflagella in their periplasmic space. The filaments rotate in this space, between the outer membrane and the peptidoglycan layer, propelling the bacterium forward in a corkscrew-like motion. The outer membrane of Borrelia species contains outer surface proteins (Osp) that play a role in their virulence.

== Phylogeny ==
The taxonomy is based on the List of Prokaryotic names with Standing in Nomenclature (LPSN) and National Center for Biotechnology Information (NCBI):

16S rRNA based LTP_10_2024

- Borrelia
  - Relapsing fever Borrelia
    - B. turcica
    - - B. coriaceae
      - B. miyamotoi
  - Lyme disease Borrelia
    - - B. yangtzensis
      - - B. valaisiana
        - - B. spielmanii
          - - B. afzelii
            - B. turdi
    - - - B. lanei
        - - B. americana
          - B. mayonii
      - - B. californiensis
        - - - B. bissettii
            - - B. burgdorferi
              - - B. carolinensis Rudenko et al. 2011
                - B. kurtenbachii Margos et al. 2013
          - - - B. lusitaniae Le Fleche et al. 1997
              - B. garinii
                - B. g. garinii Baranton et al. 1992
                - "B. g. bavariensis" (Margos et al. 2013)
            - - B. tanukii Fukunaga et al. 1997
              - - B. maritima
                - - B. japonica Kawabata et al. 1994
                  - B. sinica Masuzawa et al. 2001

120 marker proteins based GTDB 10-RS226

- - Borrelia (Relapsing fever)
    - - "Ca. B. tachyglossi" Loh et al. 2017
      - B. turcica Güner et al. 2004
    - - B. miyamotoi Fukunaga et al. 1995
      - - - B. persica (Dschunkowsky 1913) Steinhaus 1946
          - - B. hispanica (de Buen 1926) Steinhaus 1946
            - B. duttonii (Novy & Knapp 1906) Bergey et al. 1925 [incl. B. crocidurae
              (Léger 1917) Davis 1957; B. recurrentis (Lebert 1874) Bergey et al. 1925]
        - - B. anserina (Sakharoff 1891) Bergey et al. 1925
          - - B. hermsii (Davis 1942) Steinhaus 1946
            - - B. coriaceae Johnson et al. 1987
              - - B. puertoricensis Bermudez et al. 2021
                - - B. parkeri (Davis 1942) Steinhaus 1946
                  - B. turicatae (Brumpt 1933) Steinhaus 1946 [incl. B. parkeri
                    (Davis 1942) Steinhaus 1946; "B. puertoricensis" Bermudez et al. 2021;
                    B. venezuelensis (Brumpt 1921) Brumpt 1922]
  - Borreliella (Lyme disease)
    - "B. chilensis" (Ivanova et al. 2014) Adeolu & Gupta 2014
    - - Borrelia maritima Margos et al. 2020
      - - - - "Borrelia tanukii" (Fukunaga et al. 1997) Adeolu & Gupta 2014
            - - B. valaisiana (Wang et al. 1997) Adeolu & Gupta 2018
              - B. yangtzensis (Margos et al. 2015) Gupta 2020
          - - B. lusitaniae (Le Fleche et al. 1997) Adeolu & Gupta 2014
            - - - "B. turdi" (Fukunaga et al. 1997) Adeolu & Gupta 2014
                - - B. afzelii (Canica et al. 1994) Adeolu & Gupta 2018
                  - B. spielmanii (Richter et al. 2006) Adeolu & Gupta 2015
              - - B. garinii (Baranton et al. 1992) Adeolu & Gupta 2015
                  [incl. B. bavariensis (Margos et al. 2013) Adeolu & Gupta 2015]
                - - B. japonica (Kawabata et al. 1994) Adeolu & Gupta 2015
                  - B. sinica (Masuzawa et al. 2001) Adeolu & Gupta 2015
        - - B. mayonii (Pritt et al. 2016) Gupta 2020
          - - - B. californiensis (Margos et al. 2016) Gupta 2020
              - B. carolinensis (Rudenko et al. 2011) Adeolu & Gupta 2015
            - - B. lanei (Margos et al. 2017) Gupta 2020
              - - - B. americana (Rudenko et al. 2010) Adeolu & Gupta 2018
                  - "B. andersonii" (Marconi, Liveris & Schwartz 1995) Adeolu & Gupta 2014
                - - B. burgdorferi (Johnson et al. 1984) Adeolu & Gupta 2015
                  - "B. finlandensis" (Casjens et al. 2011) Adeolu & Gupta 2014

Species incertae sedis:

- "Ca. Borrelia africana" Ehounoud et al. 2016
- "Ca. Borrelia algerica" Fotso et al. 2015
- "Ca. Borrelia aligera" Norte et al. 2020
- "Ca. Borrelia amblyommatis" corrig. Jiang et al. 2021 ["Ca. Borrelia javanense" Jiang et al. 2021]
- Borrelia baltazardii corrig. Karimi et al. 1979 ex Karimi et al. 1983
- Borrelia brasiliensis Davis 1952
- "Ca. Borrelia caatinga" de Oliveira et al. 2023
- Borrelia caucasica (Kandelaki 1945) Davis 1957
- "Ca. Borrelia darwini" Parrague-Migone et al. 2025
- Borrelia dugesii (Mazzotti 1949) Davis 1957
- "Ca. Borrelia fainii" Qiu et al. 2019
- Borrelia graingeri (Heisch 1953) Davis 1957
- Borrelia harveyi (Garnham 1947) Davis 1948
- "Ca. Borrelia ibitipocensis" corrig. Muñoz-Leal et al. 2020
- "Ca. Borrelia ivorensis" Ehounoud et al. 2016
- "Ca. Borrelia johnsonii" Schwan et al. 2009
- "Ca. Borrelia kalaharica" Fingerle et al. 2016
- Borrelia latyschewii (Sofiev 1941) Davis 1948
- "Ca. Borrelia limariensis" Parrague-Migone et al. 2025
- "Borrelia lonestari" Barbour et al. 1996
- "Ca. Borrelia mahuryensis" Binetruy et al. 2020
- Borrelia mazzottii Davis 1956
- "Borrelia merionesi" Hougen 1974 non (Blanc & Maurice 1948) Davis 1948
- "Borrelia microti" (Rafyi 1946) Davis 1948
- "Ca. Borrelia mimona" Weck et al. 2024
- "Ca. Borrelia mvumii" Mitani et al. 2004
- "Borrelia myelophthora" (Steiner 1931) Ahrens & Muschner 1958
- "Borrelia nietonii" Schwan et al. 2024
- "Ca. Borrelia octodonta" Santodomingo et al. 2024
- "Ca. Borrelia paulista" Weck et al. 2022
- "B. rubricentralis" Gofton et al. 2023
- "Ca. B. sibirica" Sabitova et al. 2022
- "Ca. Borrelia texasensis" Adeolu & Gupta 2014
- Borrelia theileri (Laveran 1903) Bergey et al. 1925
- Borrelia tillae Zumpt & Organ 1961
- "B. undatumii" Gofton et al. 2023
- Borreliella bissettii (Margos et al. 2016) Gupta 2020
- Borreliella kurtenbachii (Margos et al. 2013) Adeolu & Gupta 2015

== Vectors ==
=== Ticks ===
Hard ticks of the family Ixodidae are common vectors of Borellia bacteria and are the only type of ticks shown to transmit Lyme disease bacteria to humans. Some tick species of the Ambylomma genus are vectors of Candidatus Borrelia mahuryensis in South America.

Global hard tick species that cause Lyme disease
Region	Tick species	Common name
East and Midwest (US)	Ixodes scapularis	Black-legged tick, deer tick
Pacific Coast (US)	Ixodes pacificus	Western black-legged tick
Europe	Ixodes ricinus	Sheep tick
Asia	Ixodes persulcatus	Taiga tick

Other species are carried by soft ticks. The soft tick Ornithodoros carries the species of Borellia that cause relapsing fever. Another species, B. anserina, is carried by the soft tick Argas. Inside the ticks, the bacteria grow in the midgut and then travel to the salivary glands to be transmitted to a new host. Ticks can spread the bacteria to each other when co-feeding. If an animal has been infected by a tick and then is bitten by a second tick, the second tick can become infected. The bacteria are most commonly transmitted to humans through ticks in the nymph stage of development, because they are smaller and less likely to be noticed and removed. The ticks must have around 36 to 48 hours of contact with a host to successfully transmit the bacteria.

=== Lice ===
Lice that feed on infected humans acquire the Borrelia organisms that then multiply in the hemolymph and gut of the lice. When an infected louse feeds on an uninfected human, the organism gains access when the victim crushes the louse or scratches the area where the louse is feeding. The U. S. Centers for Disease Control and Prevention reported that no credible evidence shows that lice can carry Borrelia.

== Pathology ==
=== Lyme disease ===
Of the 52 known species of Borrelia, 20 belong to the Lyme disease group and are transmitted by ticks. Eight are known to cause Lyme disease or Borreliosis. The major Borrelia species causing Lyme disease are Borrelia burgdorferi, Borrelia afzelii, and Borrelia garinii. All species that cause Lyme disease are referred to collectively as B. burgdorferi sensu lato, while B. burgdorferi itself is specified as B. burgdorferi sensu stricto. B. burgdorferi was previously believed to be the only species to cause Lyme disease in the US, but B. bissettiae and a new species called B. mayonii cause Lyme disease in the US, as well. The remaining five human pathogenic species occur only in Europe and Asia.

=== Relapsing fever ===
Relapsing fever (RF) borreliosis often occurs with severe bacteremia. Twenty-five species of Borrelia are known to cause relapsing fever. While most species use the soft tick family Argasidae as their vector, some outliers live in hard ticks or lice. Relapsing fever can be spread epidemically through lice or endemically through ticks.

B. recurrentis, a common species underlying relapsing fever, is transmitted by the human body louse; no other animal reservoir of B. recurrentis is known. B. recurrentis infects the person via mucous membranes and then invades the bloodstream.

Other tick-borne relapsing infections are acquired from other species, such as B. hermsii, B. parkeri, or B. miyamotoi, which can be spread from rodents, and serve as a reservoir for the infection, via a tick vector. B. hermsii and B. recurrentis cause very similar diseases, although the disease associated with B. hermsii has more relapses and is responsible for more fatalities, while the disease caused by B. recurrentis has longer febrile and afebrile intervals and a longer incubation period.

==== Borellia miyamotoi disease ====
B. miyamotoi is different from other relapsing-fever species in that it can also be spread by the same hard-shell Ixodes tick that spread Lyme disease. Other species are spread by the softbody Ornithodoros tick.

== Diagnosis ==
Direct tests include culture of Borrelia from skin, blood, or cerebrospinal fluid (CSF), and detection of genetic material by polymerase chain reaction in skin, blood, or synovial fluid. Two-tiered serological testing is performed for differential diagnosis of Borrelia infection. The first-tier tests detect specific antibodies (IgM and IgG together or separately) and include enzyme-linked immunoassays (e.g. ELISAs) and immunofluorescent assays. Positive results for first-tier tests are confirmed using second-tier testing. The second tier consists of standardized immunoblotting, either by using Western blots or blots striped with diagnostically important purified antigens. Positive results for second-tier tests are confirmatory for the presence of Borrelia infection. Spirochetes can also be seen using Wright-stained blood smears.

== See also ==
- List of bacteria genera
- List of bacterial orders
