= Tick-borne encephalitis =

Viral infection of the nervous system

Tick-borne meningoencephalitis
- Infected countries/areas in Eurasia
- Specialty: Infectious disease

Tick-borne encephalitis (TBE) is a viral infectious disease involving the central nervous system caused by the tick-borne encephalitis virus (TBEV), which is a type of orthoflavivirus. The virus can be transmitted by the bite of several species of infected ticks. There are several subtypes of TBEV that have been identified: European (TBEV-Eu), Siberian (TBEV-Sib), and Far Eastern (TBEV-FE). The European subtype is mainly associated with the sheep tick (Ixodes ricinus), whereas the Siberian and Far Eastern subtypes are mainly associated with the taiga tick (Ixodes persulcatus). Two additional subtypes, Baikalian (TBEV-Bkl) and Himalayan (TBEV-Him), have also been described. The disease can manifests as flu-like symptoms, including muscle aches and fatigue. When there is neurological involvement, patients may experience meningitis, encephalitis or meningoencephalitis. Myelitis and spinal paralysis also occur. Patients may present with fever, headache, neck pain, changes in consciousness, abnormal movements, or even paralysis. Patient symptoms may differ depending on the part of the brain that is affected. Although mortality is low, a significant amount of patients may experience long-term neurological changes, including 40-50% of patients who may develop post-encephalitic syndrome (PES).

The number of reported cases has increased over the last several decades, particularly in areas of Europe and Asia, and poses a growing public health issue. The increase in infection may be from a combination of environmental and climate factors, as well as sociological factors including human behavior, that have changed tick distribution and exposure. No specific treatment exists currently for TBE, and existing therapies are considered supportive. Vaccination remains the best way to prevent TBE and are often recommended in endemic areas. Studies on TBE vaccination show high effectiveness in disease prevention with generally low adverse reactions, although vaccine uptake may vary between countries.

== Signs and symptoms ==
Symptoms of TBE-infection

TBE virus can vary in presentation depending on the subtype contracted and age of patient. Patients may present with monophasic or biphasic (febrile sickness, then neurological symptoms) disease course. Many infected patients may be asymptomatic. The incubation period of TBE is typically 1-2 weeks. Symptoms may be nonspecific and mild (including fevers, flu-like symptoms, and muscle aches), or involve the neurological system and be more severe (abnormal movements, cognitive dysfunction, tremors, meningeal irritation, Seizures, or paralysis). Some patients may initially experience non-specific symptoms, then a temporary clearance of symptoms, before experiencing more severe neurological symptoms. Disease presentation and severity may differ on subtype of TBE.

Almost 40% of patients with acute TBE experienced sequelae which persists for a year or longer. The most common long-term symptoms include cognitive changes, neuropsychiatric complaints, weakness, changes in vision or movements. Some patients report permanent neurological changes. These changes can have lasting impact on the daily function of patients. Factors such as increase in age is associated with worse outcomes, while children tend to have milder illness. Some studies report a more chronic form of TBE although it remains difficult to define whether this is a separate mechanism or due to persistent ongoing infection, and has only been linked to some subtypes of the virus.

Mortality is rare overall (around 1-2%) but can depends on the subtype of the virus. Some subtypes, notably the Siberian subtype and Far Eastern has a higher mortality rate of around 2-6%.

In animals infected with TBE, symptoms including seizures, fever, ataxia and other movement changes, vision changes may be seen. Some animals including ruminants and horses may be asymptomatic.

== Cause and Transmission ==
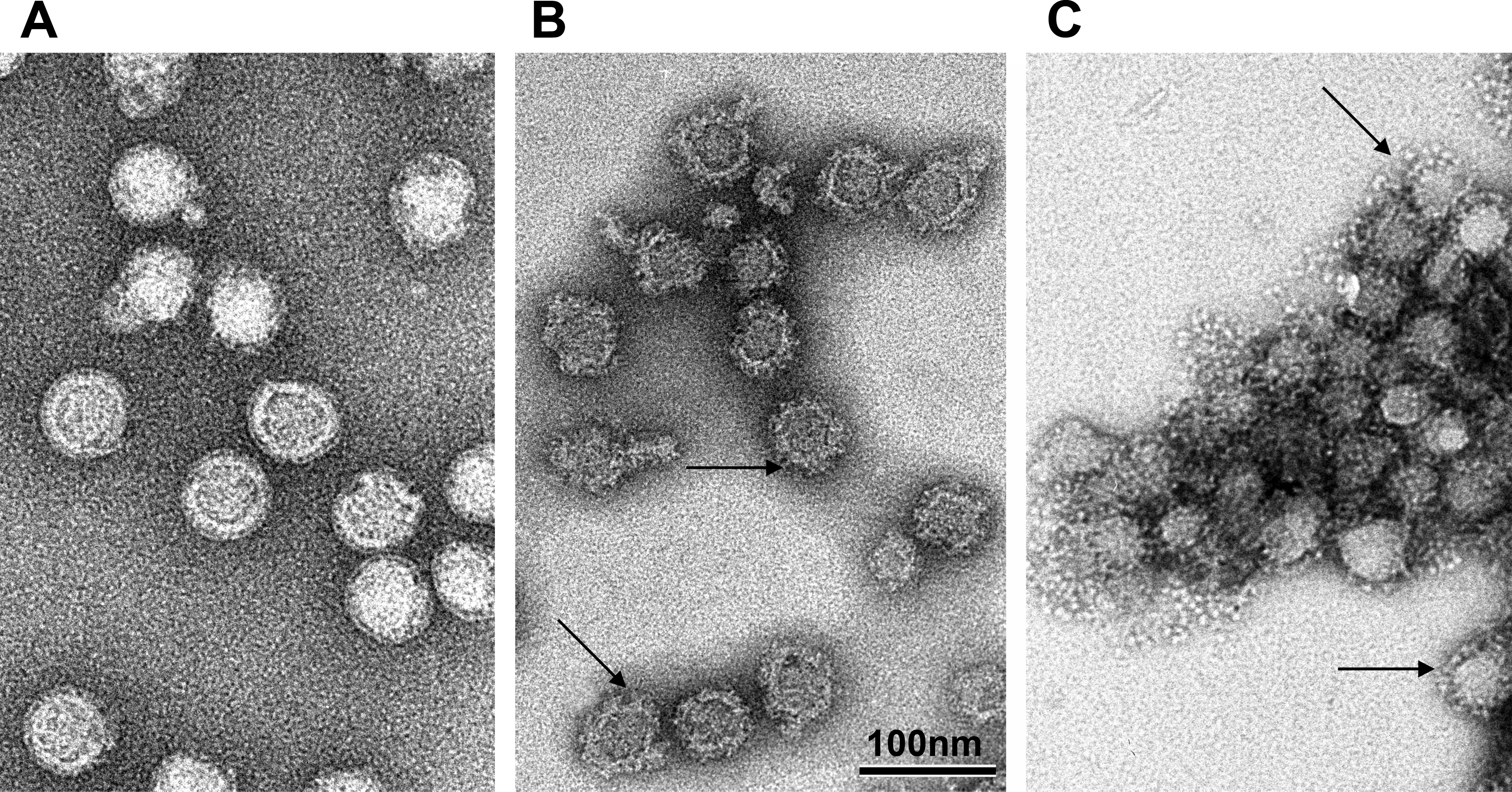
Electron Micrograph Images of Tick-Borne Encephalitis Virus at pH 8.0 (A), 10.0 (B), and 5.4 (C)

TBE is caused by tick-borne encephalitis virus, a member of the genus Flavivirus in the family Flaviviridae. It was first isolated in 1937 in the USSR by a team led by Lev A. Zilber, although many researchers in other countries had also began describing tick-borne encephalitis by this time.

Three common TBEV subtypes have traditionally been recognized: European (TBEV-Eu), Siberian (TBEV-Sib), and Far Eastern (TBEV-FE). The European subtype is mainly associated with Ixodes ricinus, whereas the Siberian and Far Eastern subtypes are mainly associated with Ixodes persulcatus. Two additional subtypes, Baikalian (TBEV-Bkl) and Himalayan (TBEV-Him), have also been described.

=== Transmission ===
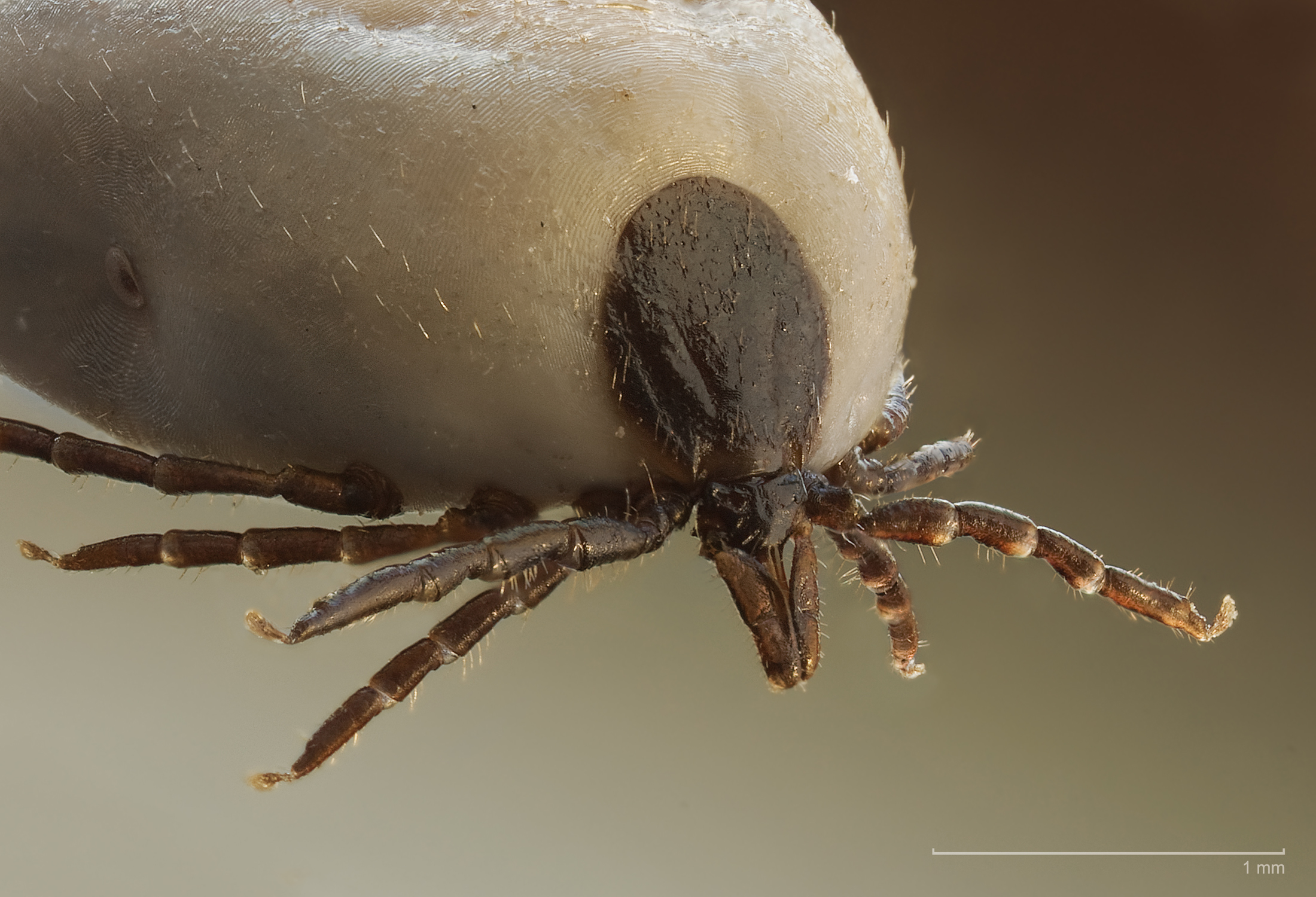
Sheep ticks (Ixodes ricinus), such as this engorged female, transmit the disease

TBE is primarily transmitted by the bite of several species of infected ticks, including Ixodes scapularis, I. ricinus and I. persulcatus. Other modes of transmission are rare but possible, including through ingestion of non-pasteurized dairy products of infected animals due to viral shedding into animal milk. Rarely, people can transmit the infection via blood products, transplants, breastmilk, or laboratory exposure.

Humans are considered terminal hosts, where once infected, they usually cannot further transmit the infection due to low viremia load in the blood.

=== Transmission Cycle ===
Ticks become infected with TBE when they take a blood-meal from an infected host (usually a mammal). When the tick bites a different animal, the virus can infect the new animal via tick saliva that enters during feeding. Once ticks are infected, they remain active with the infection for the rest of their lifespan. Ticks known to carry TBEV include Ixodes Ricinus, Ixodes persulcatus, Haemaphysalis concinna, as well as many other species. The distribution of tick species is often geographical with I. ricinus found predominantly across diverse habitats in Europe and I. persulcatus found across Eastern Europe and parts of Asia. Some species are more active in areas with cooler temperatures.

Infected ticks can also transmit the disease to other ticks in a process known as vertical transmission.Specifically, the disease can be passed through tick offspring via eggs in a process known as trans-ovarial route of transmission, or via trans-stadial transmission where the virus survives inside the tick as it undergoes various development life stages (for example: larva to nymph). Ticks can also infect each other through co-feeding, where an uninfected tick can become infected after feeding in close proximity to an infected tick. Co-feeding transmission can occur even if the animal is not viremic itself.

== Diagnosis ==
Detection of specific IgM and IgG antibodies in patients' sera, combined with typical clinical signs, is the principal method for diagnosis. The antibodies usually appear within six days after the onset of symptoms and are generally detectable once neurological signs appear. IgM antibodies may remain detectable for up to 10 months in both vaccinated individuals and those infected naturally. In more complicated situations, e.g., after vaccination, testing for the presence of antibodies in cerebrospinal fluid may be necessary. It has been stated that lumbar puncture should always be performed when diagnosing TBE and that pleocytosis in cerebrospinal fluid (CSF) should be added to the diagnostic criteria. The severity of TBE could be assessed using CSF calcium levels, according to recent studies of diagnostic markers for tick-borne encephalitis virus (TBEV).

PCR (polymerase chain reaction) method is rarely used, since TBE virus RNA is most often not present in patient sera or cerebrospinal fluid at the time of neurological symptoms.

== Prevention ==
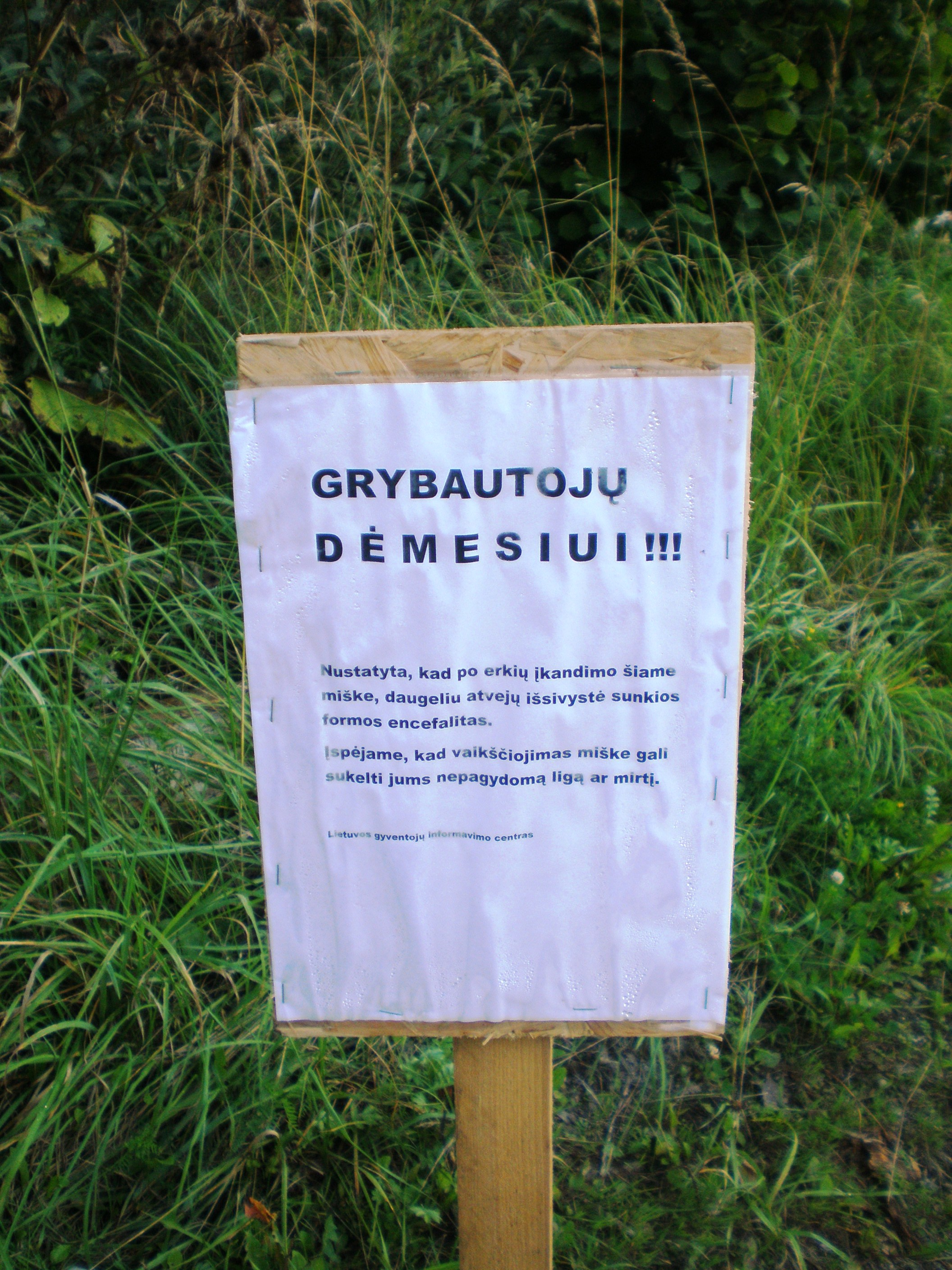
A sign in a Lithuanian forest, warning about a high probability of being infected by tick-borne encephalitis

Prevention includes non-specific (tick-bite prevention) and specific prophylaxis in the form of a vaccination. According to the CDC, non-specific tick-bite prevention for TBEV includes using EPA-registered insect repellent, wearing long-sleeved shirts and pants in high-risk areas, and treating clothing and gear with 0.5% permethrin. Tick checks, while useful for preventing some other tick-borne diseases such as Lyme disease, would not be expected to be effective in the prevention of tick-borne encephalitis, as the virus is transmitted within minutes of attachment by the tick.

Tick-borne encephalitis vaccines are very effective and available in many disease-endemic areas and in travel clinics. The TICOVAC vaccine was approved for use in Europe in 2001 and in the United States in 2021, and is recommended for people who are traveling to endemic areas during warm months, participating in outdoor activities near tick areas, or staying for long/repeated trips to known endemic regions. The TICOVAC vaccine is available in a series of 3 doses spaced months apart, with a booster (fourth) dose that is recommended years later if there is ongoing exposure. It is recommended for individuals to finish the primary series prior to traveling to endemic areas.

== Treatment ==
There is no established specific antiviral treatment for TBE, so treatment is supportive care and largely driven by symptom severity. Associated symptoms such as pain, nausea, and vomiting are treated with appropriate pain control, antiemetic therapy, and rehydration. Severe cases of meningoencephalitis or meningoencephalomyelitis warrant ICU admission. Neurologic symptoms, such as brain edema, increased intracranial pressure, or seizures, are also managed according to degree of symptom severity, and may necessitate tracheal intubation and respiratory support.

Some patients may require longterm support because of disease sequelae, including those with longterm neurological changes due to post-encephalic syndrome. Further supportive treatment may be necessary based off of the type of symptoms a patient have. Some patients may present with neurological changes including issues with mobility and balance, or chronic headaches, neuropsychiatric changes including changes in mood or difficulty concentration, or other changes. Symptomatic treatment therapies including rehabilitation services, physical or occupational therapy, for these specific symptoms may be useful. Although there have been no current literature regarding the efficacy of these therapies for TBE, they have been recommended for other longterm tick-related diseases with adverse neurological outcomes.

== Epidemiology ==
As of 2022, the disease was most common in Central and Eastern Europe, and Northern Asia; the European Union reported 3,516 confirmed cases of TBE. In 2022, the EU notification rate was 0.81 per 100,000 people, which was a 14% increase from 2021. About ten to twelve thousand cases are documented a year, but the rates vary widely from one region to another. Most of the variation has been the result of variation in host population, particularly that of deer. In Austria, an extensive vaccination program since the 1970s reduced the incidence in 2013 by roughly 85%.

In Germany, during the 2010s, there have been a minimum of 95 (2012) and a maximum of 584 cases (2018) of TBE (or FSME as it is known in German). More than half of the reported cases from 2019 had meningitis, encephalitis, or myelitis. The risk of infection was noted to be increasing with age, especially in people older than 40 years, and it was greater in men than in women. Most cases were acquired in Bavaria (46%) and Baden-Württemberg (37%), much less in Saxony, Hesse, Lower Saxony, and other states. Altogether 164 Landkreise are designated TBE-risk areas, including all of Baden-Württemberg except for the city of Heilbronn.

In Czech Republic, a reported 10 year record was reached in 2025, with a low average vaccination rate estimated at 40% of the population having received at least a dose (a 3 doses protocol is normally considered necessary for effectiveness).

In Sweden, most cases of TBE occur in a band running from Stockholm to the west, especially around lakes and the nearby region of the Baltic sea. It reflects the greater population involved in outdoor activities in these areas. Overall, for Europe, the estimated risk is roughly 1 case per 10,000 human-months of woodland activity. In some regions of Russia and Slovenia, the prevalence of cases can be as high as 70 cases per 100,000 people per year. Travelers to endemic regions do not often become cases, with only 8 cases reported among U.S. travelers returning from Eurasia between 2000 and 2017, a rate so low that as of 2020 the U.S. Centers for Disease Control and Prevention recommended vaccination only for those who will be extensively exposed in high risk areas.

=== Influence of climate change ===
Warming temperatures caused by climate change increase the expansion of tick populations and lengthen their active seasons which in turn increase the prevalence and geographical range of tick-borne diseases. In Europe, expansion of tick-borne diseases to the north due to climate change has already been observed, especially for Lyme disease and tick-borne encephalitis. Ixodes ricinus is predicted to become 5–7% more prevalent on livestock farms in Great Britain, depending on the extent of future climate change.
