= Black-legged tick =

Black-legged tick may refer to either of two species of ticks found in North America which are both vectors of Lyme Disease:

- Ixodes scapularis, also known as the "deer tick" or "bear tick", found in eastern North America
- Ixodes pacificus, the western black-legged tick, found on western coast of North America
