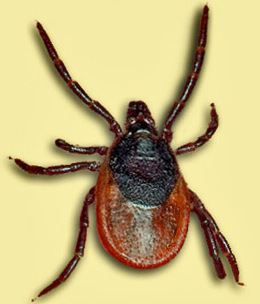

Scientific classification
- Domain: Eukaryota
- Kingdom: Animalia
- Phylum: Arthropoda
- Subphylum: Chelicerata
- Class: Arachnida
- Order: Ixodida
- Family: Ixodidae
- Genus: Ixodes
- Species: I. persulcatus

Binomial name
- Ixodes persulcatus (Schulze, 1930)

= Ixodes persulcatus =

Species of tick

Ixodes persulcatus, the taiga tick, is a species of hard-bodied tick distributed from Europe through central and northern Asia to China and Japan. The sexual dimorphism of the species is marked, the male being much smaller than the female. Hosts include wild and domestic ungulates, man, dog, rabbit, and other small mammals, including the dormouse, Amur hedgehog, and occasionally birds.

== Disease transmission ==
Ixodes persulcatus ticks transmit Lyme disease, relapsing fever (Borrelia miyamotoi), babesiosis, and Siberian (TBEV-Sib) and Far Eastern (TBEV-FE) tick-borne encephalitis, and probably human granulocytic anaplasmosis as well. A recent study of the northernmost tick-borne encephalitis focus in Simo, Finnish Lapland, found I. persulcatus ticks in scattered foci along the western coast, including the Kokkola archipelago and Närpes municipality, demonstrating a northward movement of foci and an unusual combination of the TBEV-Eur strain and I. persulcatus ticks in an area with no evidence of cocirculation of tick species or TBEV subtypes.
