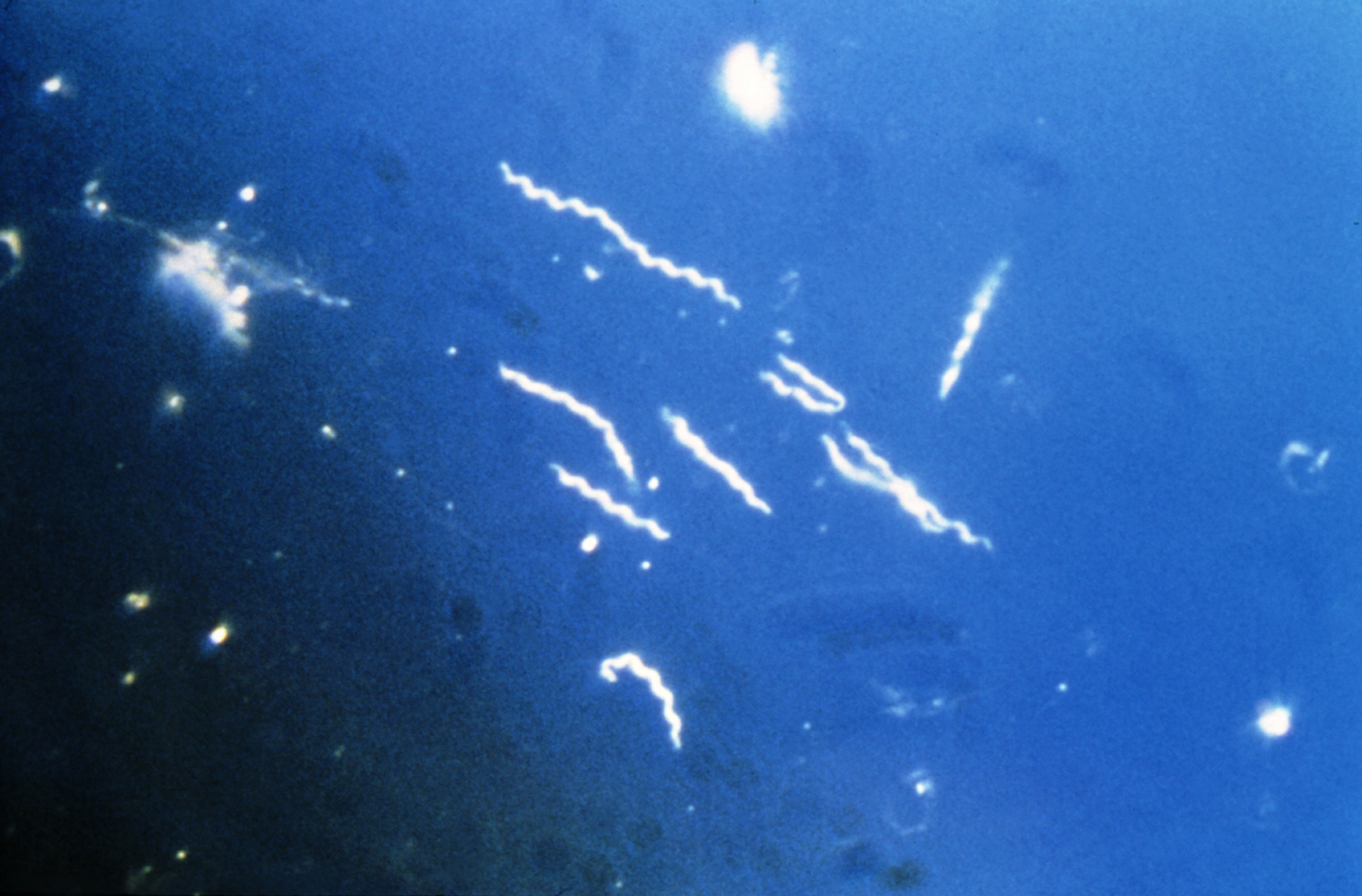
- Borrelia burgdorferi

Scientific classification
- Domain: Bacteria
- Kingdom: Pseudomonadati
- Phylum: Spirochaetota
- Class: Spirochaetia
- Order: Spirochaetales
- Family: Borreliaceae
- Genus: Borrelia
- Species: B. burgdorferi

Binomial name
- Borrelia burgdorferi Johnson et al. 1984 emend. Baranton et al. 1992

= Borrelia burgdorferi =

Species of bacteria

Borrelia (Borreliella) burgdorferi is a bacterial species of the Spirochaetes phylum in the genus Borrelia, and is one of the causative agents of Lyme disease in humans. Along with a few similar genospecies, some of which also cause Lyme disease, it makes up the species complex of Borrelia burgdorferi sensu lato. The complex currently comprises 20 accepted and 3 proposed genospecies. B. burgdorferi sensu stricto exists in North America and Eurasia and until 2016 was the only known cause of Lyme disease in North America. B. burgdorferi are often mistakenly described as Gram negative because of their two external membranes, but they lack lipopolysaccharide and possess many surface lipoproteins, unlike true Gram-negative bacteria.

== Microbiology ==
Borrelia burgdorferi is named after the researcher Willy Burgdorfer, who first isolated the bacterium in 1982.

Test type	Test	Characteristics
Colony characters	Size	Small
Colony characters	Type	Round
Colony characters	Color	White
Colony characters	Shape	Raised
Morphological characters	Shape	Spirochete
Physiological characters	Motility	+
Physiological characters	Growth at 6.5% NaCl	+
Biochemical characters	Gram staining	-
Biochemical characters	Oxidase	-
Biochemical characters	Catalase	-
Biochemical characters	Oxidative-Fermentative	Fermentative
Biochemical characters	β-Galactosidase	+
Utilization of	Glycerol	+
Utilization of	Galactose	+
Utilization of	D-Glucose	+
Utilization of	D-Mannose	+

Borrelia burgdorferi is a microaerophile, requiring small amounts of oxygen in order to undergo glycolysis and survive. Like all other Borrelia spp., this bacterium is also gram-negative and a spirochete. Borrelia colonies are often small, rounded, and white with an elevated center. B. burgdorferi possesses flagella that allow it motility. It may be oxidase negative, but B. burgdorferi possesses a gene coding for superoxide dismutase. This protein inhibits the accumulation of reactive oxygen species (ROS). The bacterium appears able to utilize many different monosaccharides for use in energy production.

=== Morphology ===
B. burgdorferi resembles other spirochetes in that it has an outer membrane and inner membrane with a thin layer of peptidoglycan in between. It is characterized as having a flexible cell well and has cells that are long and cylindrical with them being roughly 1 micron wide. However, the outer membrane lacks lipopolysaccharide. Its shape is a flat wave. It is about 0.3 μm wide and 5 to 20 μm in length.

B. burgdorferi is a microaerobic, motile spirochete with seven to 11 bundled perisplasmic flagella set at each end that allow the bacterium to move in low- and high-viscosity media alike, which is related to its high virulence factor.

=== Metabolism ===
B. burgdorferi is a slow-growing microaerophilic spirochete with a doubling time of 24 to 48 hours.

=== Transformation ===
Bacterial transformation has been utilized by researchers in order to isolate specific pathogenic genes among the Borrelia burgdorferi. B. burgdorferi strains appear to be highly insufficient for use in bacterial transformation due to the large amount of DNA needed for transformation, the time it takes to produce reliable transformants, and the influence of restriction modification systems. In fact, infectivity of B. burgdorferi often requires the gene pncA, which is present on a bacterial plasmid that contains the gene bbe02 that is highly selected against during transformation. Since these genes are often paired together, infectivity is selected against in transformation, counteracting research to pinpoint particular genes that function in pathogenicity of Borrelia burgdorferi. Despite this, some headway has been made in unraveling the mysteries of B. burgdorferi, such as the discovery of gene cyaB as essential for mammalian infection.

== Life cycle ==
B. burgdorferi circulates between Ixodes ticks and a vertebrate host in an enzootic cycle. B. burgdorferi living in a tick is mainly acquired through blood meals from an infected, competent vertebrate host; rare cases of transovarial transmission have been reported, but may be attributable to Borrelia miyamotoi, a related spirochete. Once a tick is infected, it will then transmit B. burgdorferi by feeding on another vertebrate to complete the cycle. Ticks can transmit B. burgdorferi to humans, but humans are dead-end hosts, unlikely to continue the life cycle of the spirochete. Nymphs molt into adult ticks, which usually feed on larger mammals that are not able to support the survival of B. burgdorferi.

== Disease ==
B. burgdorferi is the causative agent of Lyme disease and is why this bacteria is so important and being studied. It is most commonly transmitted from ticks to humans. Humans act as the tick's host for this bacteria. Lyme disease is a zoonotic, vector-borne disease transmitted by the Ixodes tick (also the vector for Babesia and Anaplasma). The infected nymphal tick transmits B. burgdorferi via its saliva to the human during its blood meal.

Clinical presentation of Lyme disease is best known for the characteristic bull's-eye rash (also known as erythema chronicum migrans) but can also include myocarditis, cardiomyopathy, arrhythmia, arthritis, arthralgia, meningitis, neuropathies, and facial nerve palsy depending on the stage of infection.

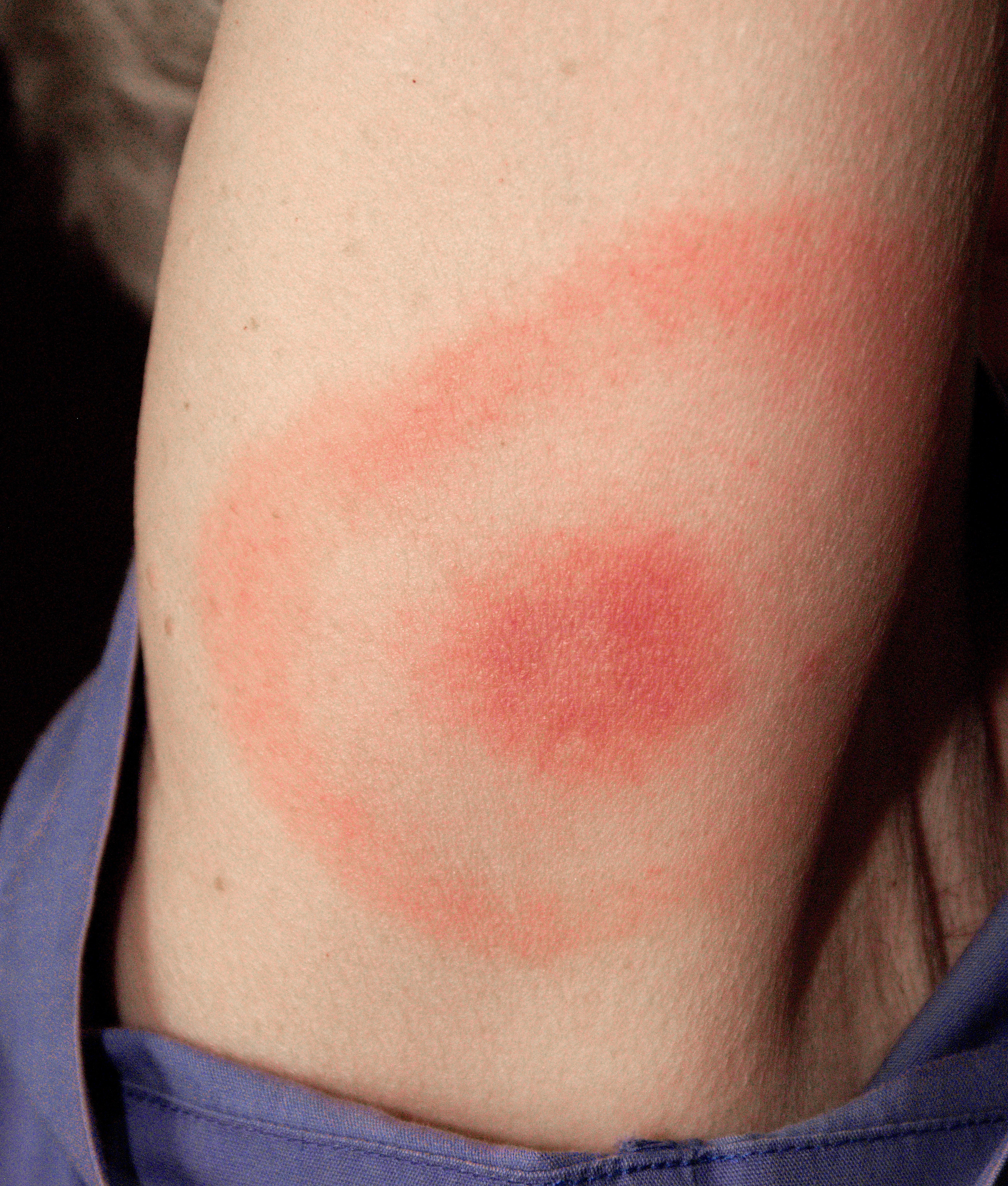
Characteristic "bull's-eye" (erythema chronicum migrans) rash of stage 1 Lyme disease

B. burgdorferi infections have been found in possible association with primary cutaneous diffuse large B-cell lymphomas (PCDLBCLs), where a review of the primary literature has, as of 2010, noted that most of the PCBCLs examined have been 'unresponsive' to antibiotics; hence, as in the case of Chlamydophila psittaci association with ocular adnexal mucosa-associated lymphoid tissue lymphoma (MALT lymphoma), the working conclusion was that "if B. burgdorferi is truly associated with PCBCL, then there is wide geographic variability and other factors are probably involved".

Progression of the disease follows three stages.

=== Stage 1 ===
Stage 1 is known as the Early Localized stage and occurs approximately 3 days - 1 month after inoculation. It affects the local area around the bite and is characterized by local swelling and / or a red "bull's-eye" rash (also known as erythema chronicum migrans) seen as an erythematous circle encircling a defined center that expands outward. It can get as large as 15 cm in diameter. Once the rash starts to subside the first symptoms can manifest as "flu-like" symptoms. At this stage, antibiotics are most efficacious to prevent further growth and symptoms of the disease before the major symptoms manifest.

=== Stage 2 ===
Stage 2 is known as the Early Disseminated stage and occurs weeks - months after infection if left untreated. The bacteria spreads via the blood through the body to affect the organs. It often presents with general symptoms such as fever, chills, fatigue, and lymphadenopathy as well as the organ-specific symptoms. It can affect the heart causing myocarditis, as well as arrhythmias such as atrioventricular blocks (which if significant enough may require the insertion of a pacemaker). It can affect the musculoskeletal system causing non-inflammatory transient arthritis and / or arthralgias. It can affect the nervous system manifesting as facial paralysis (Bell's palsy, classically bilateral), fatigue, and loss of memory.

=== Stage 3 ===
Stage 3 is known as the Late Disseminated stage and occurs months - years after the initial infection. Effects of the 3rd stage include encephalitis or meningitis, as well as migratory arthropathies (most commonly of the knee).

Anaplasmosis and babesiosis are also common tick-borne pathogens carried by the Ixodes tick that infect humans similarly to Borrelia burgdorferi. Consequently, it is possible for an Ixodes tick to coinfect a host with either two or all other diseases. When a host is coinfected, the combined effects of the diseases act synergistically, often proving to cause worse symptoms than a single infection alone Coinfected humans tend to display a more severe manifestation of Lyme disease. In addition, they tend to acquire a wider range of secondary symptoms, such as influenza-like symptoms. More studies and research must be done to determine the synergistic effect of co-infection and its effect on the human body.

=== Variation of severity ===
So far, there are three factors that may contribute to the severity of the clinical manifestation of Lyme Disease. The presence of ribosomal spacers, plasmids, and the outer surface protein C (OspC) are indicators of the severity of the infection. Additionally, humans, themselves, vary in their response to the infection. The variation in response leads to different clinical manifestations and different infections to different organs.

== Molecular pathogenesis ==
After the pathogen is transmitted, it will acclimate to the mammalian conditions. Borrelia burgdorferi will change its glycoproteins and proteases on its plasma membrane to facilitate its dissemination throughout the blood. While infecting, B. burgdorferi will express proteins that will interact with endothelial cells, platelets, chondrocytes, and the extracellular matrix. This interaction inhibits proper function of the infected areas, leading to the pathological manifestations of Lyme disease. In response, the host will initiate an inflammatory response to attempt to remove the infection.

Borrelia burgdorferi also expresses at least seven plasminogen binding proteins for interference of factor H at the activation level. This is part of a complement system evasion strategy that leads to downstream blocking of immune response.

In addition, Borrelia burgdorferi has a strategy to directly inhibit the classical pathway of complement system. A borrelial lipoprotein BBK32, expressed on the surface of Borrelia burgdorferi, binds the initiating protease complex C1 of the classical pathway. More specifically, BBK32 interacts with C1r subunit of C1. C-terminal domain of the BBK32 protein mediates the binding. As a result, C1 is trapped in an inactive form.

== Genome ==
B. burgdorferi (B31 strain) was the third microbial genome ever sequenced, following the sequencing of both Haemophilus influenzae and Mycoplasma genitalium in 1995. Its linear chromosome contains 910,725 base pairs and 853 genes. The sequencing method used was whole genome shotgun. The sequencing project, published in Nature in 1997 and Molecular Microbiology in 2000, was conducted at The Institute for Genomic Research. B. burgdorferi's genome consists of one megabase chromosome and an unusual variety of circular and linear plasmids ranging in size from 9 to 62 kilobases. The megabase chromosome, unlike many other eubacteria, has no relation to either the bacteria's virulence or to the host-parasite interaction. Some of the plasmids are necessary for the B. burgdorferi life cycle but not for propagation of the bacteria in culture.

The genomic variations of B. burgdorferi contribute to varying degrees of infection and dissemination. Each genomic group has varying antigens on its membrane receptor, which are specific to the infection of the host. One such membrane receptor is the surface protein OspC. The OspC surface protein is shown to be a strong indicator of the identification of genomic classification and the degree of dissemination. Varying number of OspC loci are indications and determinants for the variations of B. burgdorferi. The surface protein is also on the forefront of current vaccine research for Lyme disease via Borrelia.

== Bacteriophage ==
Relatively few bacteriophages are known to infect B. burgdorferi. Several phage particles were isolated and some evidence suggested that they had an 8-kb dsDNA genome. Among the best-studied Borrelia phages is φBB-1, a phage with a polyhedral head and a contractile tail of 90 nm in length. φBB-1 was the first bacteriophage that provided evidence of transduction for lateral gene transfer in Borrelia species that cause Lyme Disease. Current research aims to use bacteriophages as way of identifying virulence factors in spirochetes that lead to Lyme Disease.

== Immune Response ==
Mounting a successful immune response to Lyme disease can be complex considering the amount of cells involved. There are two different aspects to the immune system that allow for rapid and long-lasting responses. The innate immune system allows for a rapid, non-specific response to a pathogen. While the adaptive immunes system allows for a more long-lasting response that is more specific. The macrophage is part of the innate immunity as it attempts to locate, bind, and phagocytose the bacteria into an endosome. This allows for killing of the pathogen. Cytokine release during this also helps to attack the bacteria. T-cells are part of the adaptive immunity. They are more specific and can differentiate into different types that all serve different roles. The ultimate goal of the T-cells is to produce cytokines that will recruit other immune cells to the infection to help fight it. Borrelia burgdorferi has the ability to avoid detection from host immune systems, which makes it difficult to attack the infection right when it starts. The bacteria utilizes the outer surface proteins and it able to switch between them, which makes detection rather difficult [43]. This is just one example of how this bacteria can invade the immune system and not be detected. The body response to this includes integration between the innate and adaptive immunity which, like previously mentioned, includes many players.

== Evolution ==
Genetically diverse B. burgdorferi strains, as defined by the sequence of ospC, are maintained within the Northeastern United States. Balancing selection may act upon ospC or a nearby sequence to maintain the genetic variety of B. burgdorferi. Balancing selection is the process by which multiple versions of a gene are kept within the gene pool at unexpectedly high frequencies. Two major models that control the selection balance of B.burgdorferi is negative frequency-dependent selection and multiple-niche polymorphism. These models may explain how B. burgdorferi have diversified, and how selection may have affected the distribution of the B. burgdorferi variants, or the variation of specific traits of the species, in certain environments.

=== Negative-frequency dependent selection ===
In negative frequency-dependent selection, rare and uncommon variants will have a selective advantage over variants that are very common in an environment. For B. burgdorferi, low-frequency variants will be advantageous because potential hosts will be less likely to mount an immunological response to the variant-specific OspC outer protein.

=== Multiple-niche polymorphism ===
Ecological niches are all of the variables in an environment, such as the resources, competitors, and responses, that contribute to the organism's fitness. Multiple-niche polymorphism states that diversity is maintained within a population due to the varying amount of possible niches and environments. Therefore, the more various niches the more likelihood of polymophrism and diversity. For B. burgdorferi, varying vertebrae niches, such as deer and mice, can affect the overall balancing selection for variants.

== See also ==
- Jorge Benach
- Allen Steere
- Ötzi
