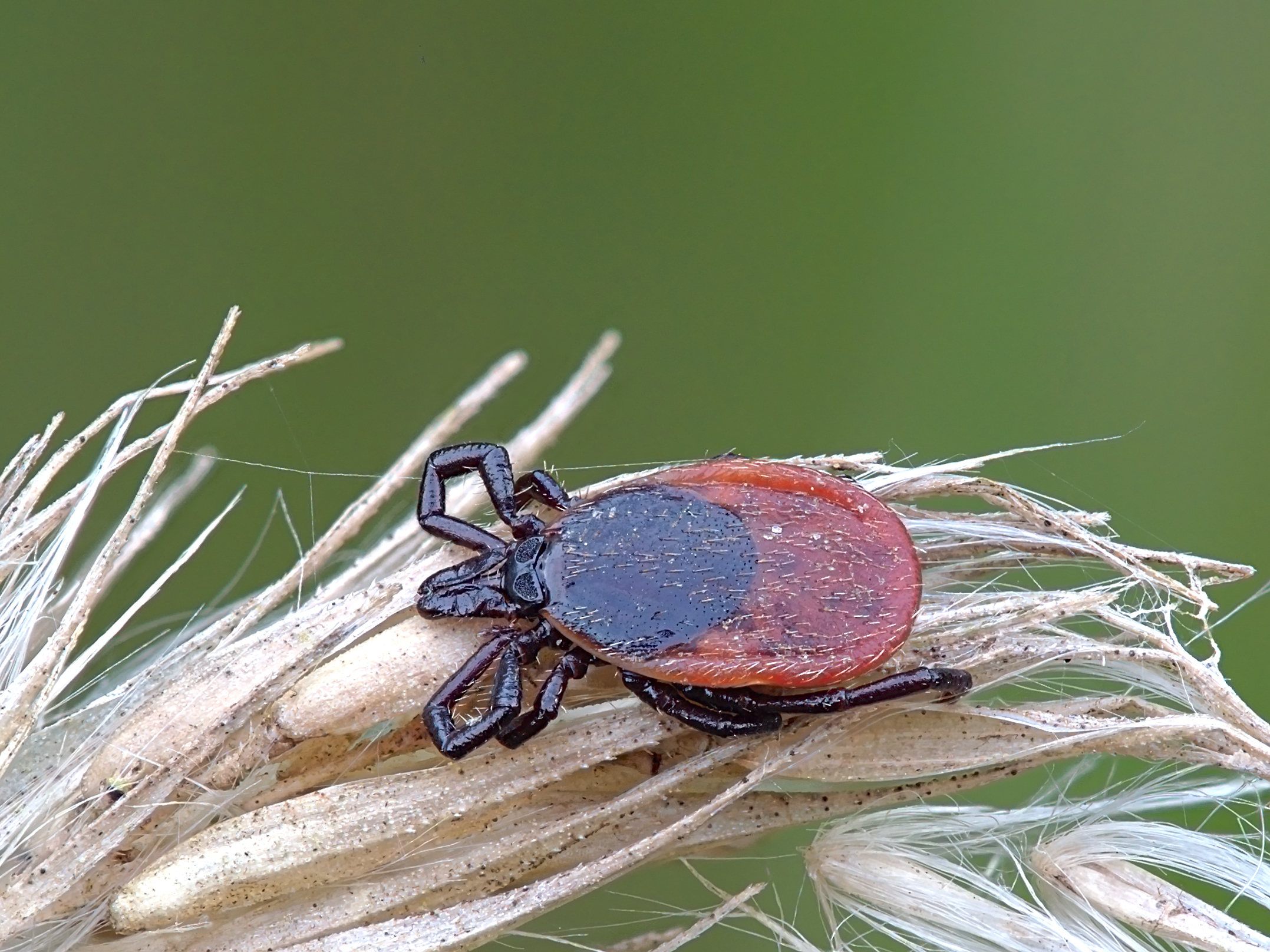
- Ixodes ricinus complete view (starved)
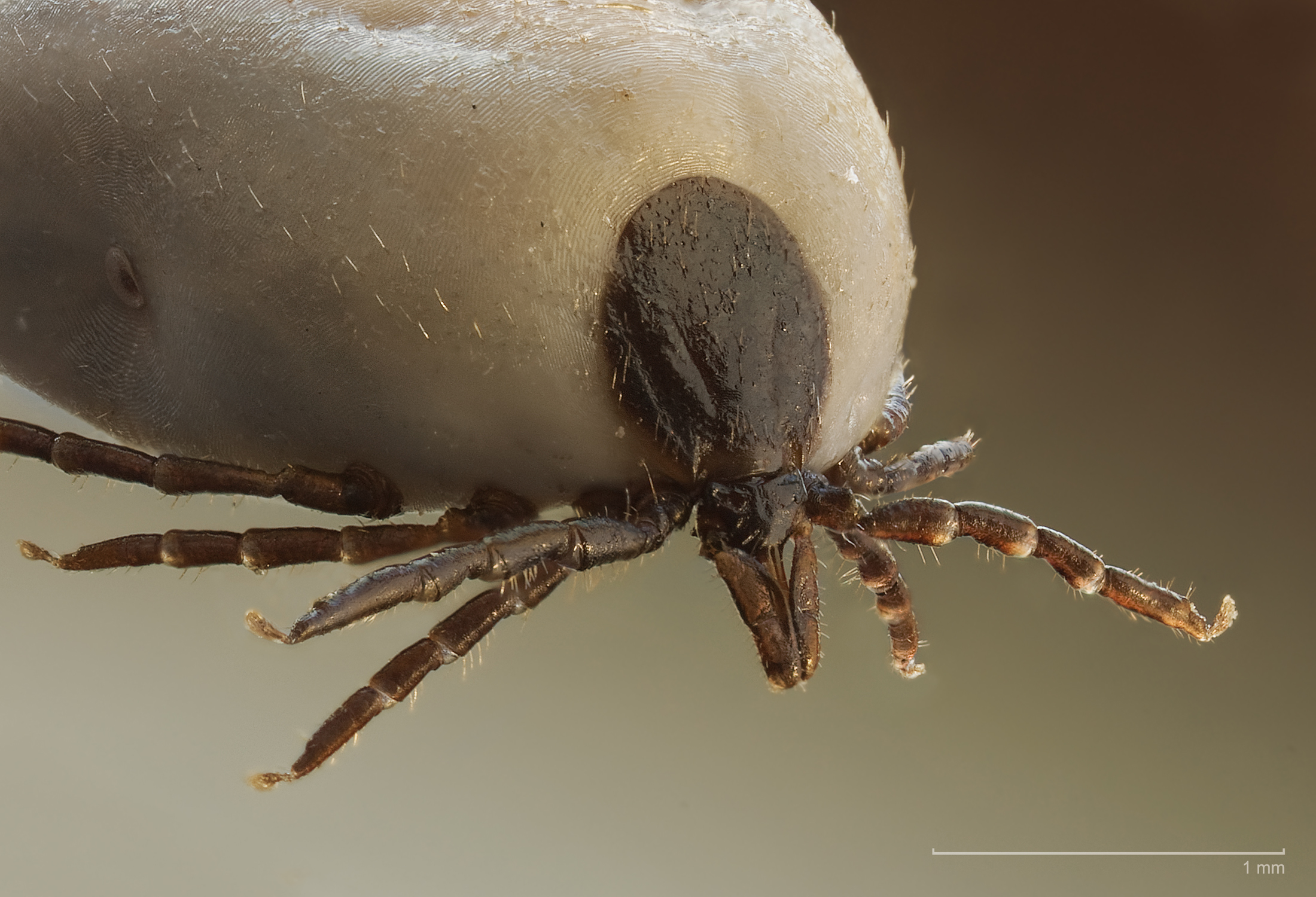
- Close-up view (engorged)

Scientific classification
- Kingdom: Animalia
- Phylum: Arthropoda
- Subphylum: Chelicerata
- Class: Arachnida
- Order: Ixodida
- Family: Ixodidae
- Genus: Ixodes
- Species: I. ricinus

Binomial name
- Ixodes ricinus (Linnaeus, 1758)
- Range of I. ricinus (marked in red) in western Eurasia and North Africa

= Ixodes ricinus =

Species of tick

Ixodes ricinus, commonly known as the castor bean tick, the sheep ked, sheep tick, is a chiefly European species of hard-bodied tick. It may reach a length of 11 mm (0.43 in) when engorged with a blood meal, and can transmit both bacterial and viral pathogens such as the causative agents of Lyme disease and tick-borne encephalitis.

== Description ==
Two females of Ixodes cf. ricinus filmed in a forest near Marburg, Hesse, Germany

In common with other species of Ixodes, I. ricinus has no eyes and is not ornate; it has no festoons (wrinkles along the posterior margin). The palpi are longer than they are wide, and an anal groove is above the anus. It has a hard dorsal shield which covers the entire opisthosoma (abdomen), but only part of it in females and nymphs. I. ricinus is the largest of the three common species of Ixodes in the British Isles (the other two being I. canisuga, the British dog tick, and I. trianguliceps, the vole tick). Adult males are 2.4–2.8 mm (0.09–0.11 in) long, and unfed nymphs are 1.3–1.5 mm (0.05–0.06 in) long; females are 3.0–3.6 mm (0.12–0.14 in) long before feeding and 11 mm (0.43 in) long when engorged.

== Distribution ==
Ixodes ricinus is found across Europe and into neighbouring parts of North Africa and the Middle East, extending as far north as Iceland and as far east as parts of Russia. Its northern limit seems to be determined by environmental factors, including temperature, since a series of mild winters in Scandinavia coincided with an expansion northwards in the range of I. ricinus.

I. ricinus is most frequent in habitats where its hosts are plentiful, including woodlands, heaths and forests. It is most prevalent in relatively humid areas, and is absent from much of the Mediterranean Region where summers are dry.

== Lifecycle ==
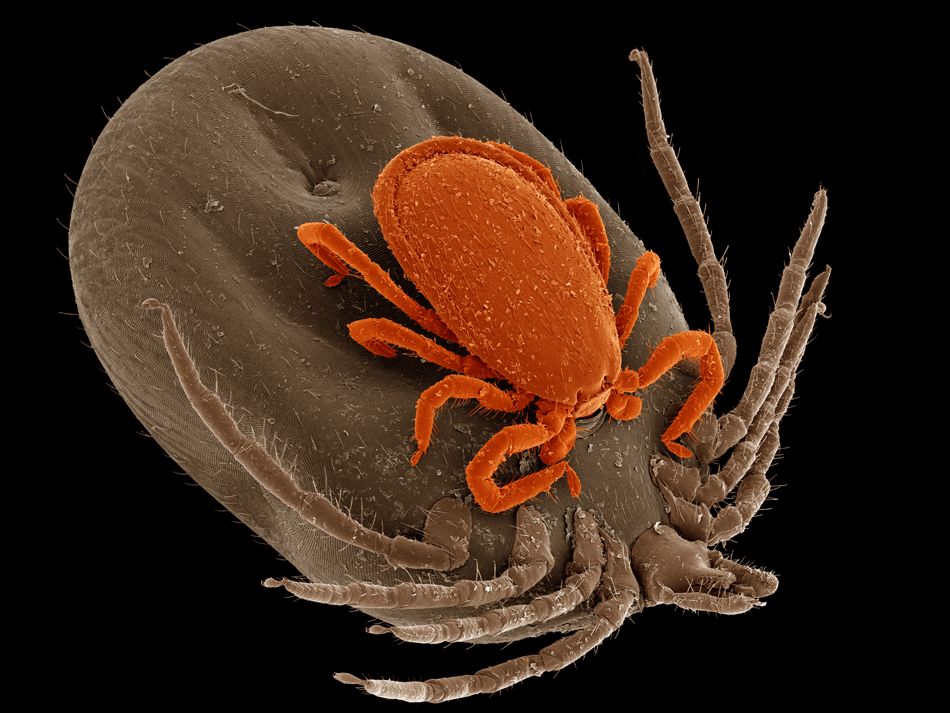
Scanning electron microscopy of a male (the smaller of the two) mating with the larger female.

Ixodes ricinus has a three-host lifecycle, which usually takes 2–3 years to complete, although it can take from 1 to 6 years in extreme cases. Adults feed on large mammals such as sheep, cattle, dogs, deer, humans, and horses for 6–13 days, before dropping off. An engorged female lays several thousand eggs and subsequently dies. The larvae that hatch do not actively seek a host, and usually feed on insectivores (order Eulipotyphla), although they may also find rodents, rabbits, birds, reptiles, or bats. They feed for 3–5 days before dropping off and moulting. The resulting nymphs then ascend grasses or twigs to seek their next host, but must return to the moist microclimate at the soil surface if they become dehydrated. The nymphs feed on small to medium-sized mammals. Nymphs exhibit seasonal "questing" activity, in which they cling on to grass or leaves and wait for a host animal to pass. This peaks in late spring and early summer, largely influenced by ambient temperature and humidity.

=== Disease transmission ===
A number of tick-borne diseases can be transmitted by I. ricinus to a variety of mammal hosts. Dogs can be infected with Lyme disease (borreliosis), caused by the spirochaete bacteria Borrelia burgdorferi, B. afzelii, and B. garinii. Cattle can become infected with redwater fever (from the protozoans Babesia divergens, B. bovis, and B. ovis), Lyme disease (from B. burgdorferi), sheep tick pyemia (Staphylococcus aureus), cattle tick-borne fever (Anaplasma phagocytophila), Q fever (Coxiella burnetii), Boutonneuse fever (Rickettsia conorii), and the bacterium Anaplasma marginale. Horses may be infected with Lyme disease, Anaplasma phagocytophila, and the viral infection louping ill. Humans can become infected with Lyme disease, louping ill, Q fever, and tick-borne encephalitis, and sensitised to mammalian red meat (and derived-products), known as alpha-gal allergy.

== Natural enemies ==
The parasitic wasp Ixodiphagus hookeri lays its eggs inside castor bean ticks, though the castor bean tick is not I. hookeri's sole host.

== Taxonomic history ==
The scientific name of the castor bean tick dates back to the starting point of zoological nomenclature, the 1758 tenth edition of Carl Linnaeus' Systema Naturae, where it appeared as Acarus ricinus. Pierre André Latreille split the new genus Ixodes from Linnaeus' Acarus (which at that time contained all known ticks and mites), and I. ricinus was chosen as the type species. It has subsequently been redescribed under a number of junior synonyms and subsequent combinations into different genera; these synonyms include Acarus ricinoides, Cynorhaestes reduvius, Cynorhaestes ricinus, Ixodes megathyreus, Ixodes bipunctatus, Cynorhaestes hermanni, Crotonus ricinus, Ixodes trabeatus, Ixodes plumbeus, Ixodes reduvius, Ixodes pustularum, Ixodes fodiens, Ixodes rufus, Ixodes sulcatus and Ixodes sciuri.

== See also ==
- Ticks of domestic animals
