= Relapsing fever =

Infectious disease caused by Borrelia bacteria

- Specialty: Infectious diseases
- Symptoms: Fever, headache, muscle pain, nausea, rash

Relapsing fever is a vector-borne disease caused by infection with certain bacteria in the genus Borrelia, which is transmitted through the bites of lice, soft-bodied ticks (genus Ornithodoros), or hard-bodied ticks (genus Ixodes).

== Signs and symptoms ==
Most infected people develop sickness between 5 and 15 days after they are bitten. The symptoms may include a sudden fever, chills, headaches, muscle or joint aches, and nausea. A rash may also occur. These symptoms usually continue for 2 to 9 days, then disappear. This cycle may continue for several weeks if the person is not treated.

== Causes ==
=== Louse-borne relapsing fever ===
Along with Rickettsia prowazekii and Bartonella quintana, Borrelia recurrentis is one of three pathogens of which the body louse (Pediculus humanus humanus) is a vector. Louse-borne relapsing fever is more severe than the tick-borne variety.

Louse-borne relapsing fever occurs in epidemics amid poor living conditions, famine, and war in the developing world. It is currently prevalent in Ethiopia and Sudan.

Mortality rate is 1% with treatment and 30–70% without treatment. Poor prognostic signs include severe jaundice, severe change in mental status, severe bleeding, and a prolonged QT interval on ECG.

Lice that feed on infected humans acquire the Borrelia organisms that then multiply in the louse's gut. When an infected louse feeds on an uninfected human, the organism gains access when the victim crushes the louse or scratches the area where the louse is feeding. B. recurrentis infects the person via the mucous membranes and then invades the bloodstream. No non-human animal reservoir exists.

=== Soft tick-borne relapsing fever ===
Soft tick-borne relapsing fever (STRF) is found primarily in Africa, Spain, Saudi Arabia, Asia, and certain areas of Canada and the western United States. STRF is caused by a variety of Borrelia species through the bite of infected soft body ticks. Rodents serve as a reservoir for the infection, which is then spread to humans by the tick vector.

- Borrelia crocidurae – occurs in Egypt, Mali, Senegal, Tunisia; vectors – Carios erraticus, Ornithodoros sonrai; animal host – shrew (Crocidura stampflii)
- Borrelia duttoni, transmitted by the soft-bodied African tick Ornithodoros moubata, is responsible for the relapsing fever found in central, eastern, and southern Africa.
- Borrelia hermsii
- Borrelia hispanica
- Borrelia parkeri
- Borrelia turicatae
- Borrelia persica

B. hermsii and B. recurrentis cause very similar diseases. However, one or two relapses are common with the disease associated with B. hermsii, which is also the most common cause of relapsing disease in the United States. (Three or four relapses are common with the disease caused by B. recurrentis, which has longer febrile and afebrile intervals and a longer incubation period than B. hermsii).

=== Hard tick-borne relapsing fever ===
Borrelia miyamotoi, which is transmitted by Ixodes ticks, was reported as a cause of tick-borne relapsing fever in 2011.

== Diagnosis ==
The diagnosis of relapsing fever can be made on blood smear as evidenced by the presence of spirochetes. Other spirochete illnesses (e.g., Lyme disease, syphilis, leptospirosis) do not show spirochetes on blood smears. Although considered the gold standard, this method lacks sensitivity and has been replaced by PCR in many settings.

== Treatment ==
Relapsing fever is easily treated with a one- to two-week course of antibiotics, and most people improve within 24 hours. Complications and death due to relapsing fever are rare.

Tetracycline-class antibiotics are most effective. These can, however, induce a Jarisch–Herxheimer reaction in over half of those treated, producing anxiety, diaphoresis, fever, tachycardia and tachypnea with an initial pressor response followed rapidly by hypotension. Recent studies have shown tumor necrosis factor-alpha may be partly responsible for this reaction.

== Research ==
Currently, no vaccine against relapsing fever is available, but research continues. Developing a vaccine is very difficult because the spirochetes avoid the immune response of the infected person (or animal) through antigenic variation. Essentially, the pathogen stays one step ahead of antibodies by changing its surface proteins. These surface proteins, lipoproteins called variable major proteins, have only 30–70% of their amino acid sequences in common, which is sufficient to create a new antigenic "identity" for the organism. Antibodies in the blood that bind to and clear spirochetes expressing the old proteins do not recognize spirochetes expressing the new ones. Antigenic variation is common among pathogenic organisms. These include the agents of malaria, gonorrhea, and sleeping sickness. Important questions about antigenic variation are also relevant for such research areas as developing a vaccine against HIV and predicting the next influenza pandemic.

== History ==
Relapsing fever has been described since the days of the ancient Greeks. After an outbreak in Edinburgh in the 1840s, relapsing fever was given its name, but the etiology of the disease was not better understood for a decade. Physician David Livingstone is credited with the first account in 1857 of a malady associated with the bite of soft ticks in Angola and Mozambique. In 1873, Otto Obermeier first described the disease-causing ability and mechanisms of spirochetes, but was unable to reproduce the disease in inoculated test subjects and thereby unable to fulfill Koch's postulates. The disease was not successfully produced in an inoculated subject until 1874. In 1904 and 1905, a series of papers outlined the cause of relapsing fever and its relationship with ticks. Both Joseph Everett Dutton and John Lancelot Todd contracted relapsing fever by performing autopsies while working in the eastern region of the Congo Free State. Dutton died there on February 27, 1905. The cause of tick-borne relapsing fever across central Africa was named Spirillum duttoni. In 1984, it was renamed Borrelia duttoni. In 1907, Frederick Percival Mackie discovered that human body louse can transmit Borrelia recurrentis, which causes relapsing fever as well. The first time relapsing fever was described in North America was in 1915 in Jefferson County, Colorado.

Sir William MacArthur suggested that relapsing fever was the cause of the yellow plague, variously called pestis flava, pestis ictericia, buidhe chonaill, or cron chonnaill, which struck early Medieval Britain and Ireland, and of epidemics which struck modern Ireland in the famine. This is consistent with the description of the symptoms experienced by King Maelgwn of Gwynedd as recorded in words attributed to Taliesin and with the "great mortality in Britain" in 548 CE noted in the Annales Cambriae.

== See also ==
- Typhus
- Continuous fever
- Intermittent fever
- Remittent fever
