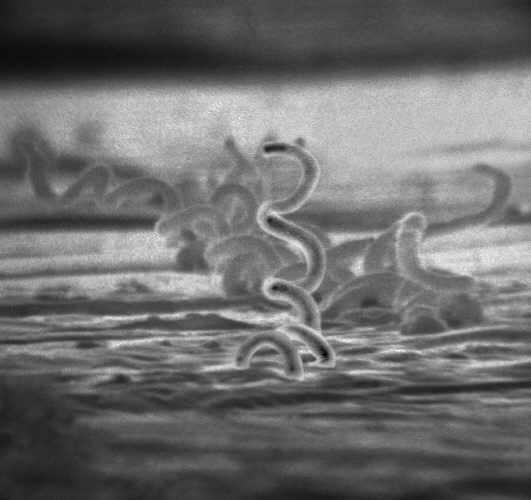
- Treponema pallidum, a spirochaete which causes syphilis

Scientific classification
- Domain: Bacteria
- Kingdom: Pseudomonadati
- Phylum: Spirochaetota; Garrity and Holt 2021
- Class: Spirochaetia; Paster 2020

Orders
- Brachyspirales; Brevinematales; Leptospirales; Spirochaetales; "Treponematales"

Synonyms
- Spirochaetota: "Protozoobacteriales" Prévot 1958; "Spirochaetae" Cavalier-Smith 2002; "Spirochaetaeota" Oren et al. 2015; "Spirochaetes" Garrity and Holt 2001; "Spirochaetota" Whitman et al. 2018; Spirochaetia: Spirochaetes Cavalier-Smith 2002; "Spirochaetia" Cavalier-Smith 2020; "Leptospiria" Cavalier-Smith 2020

= Spirochaete =

spirochaete

Phylum of bacteria

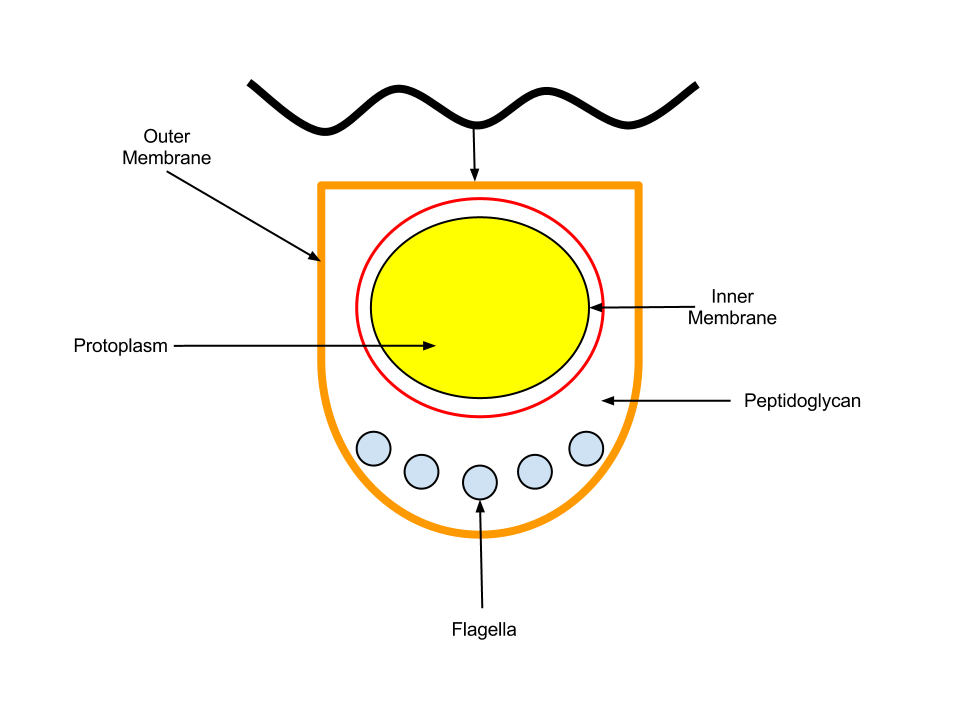
Cross section of a spirochaete cell

Endoflagella Components. Legend: Fig. 1: A cross-section of a typical spirochete cell showing endoflagella located in the periplasm between the inner cytoplasmic membrane and the outer membrane. Periplasm, consisting of a gel-like matrix, provides a semi-stable medium to secure endoflagella during rotation. The axial filament, indicated in red, is composed of bundles of endoflagella. Fig. 2: A side-view of a spirochete cell which shows two axial filaments in opposing motion. One axial filament rotates in a clockwise orientation; an adjacent axial filament rotates in a counter-clockwise orientation. Rotation of the endoflagella creates torsion and drives the corkscrew rotation of the cell. Fig. 3: An expanded view of the cellular membranes that surround endoflagellum. Both the inner and outer membrane contain a phospholipid bi-layer, with non-polar fatty acid chains in-ward of polar phosphorus heads. Peptidoglycan, the cell wall, provides structure in bacterial microorganisms. Axial filaments are superior to the peptidoglycan.

A spirochaete (/ˈspaɪroʊˌkiːt/) or spirochete is a member of the phylum Spirochaetota (also called Spirochaetes /ˌspaɪroʊˈkiːtiːz/), which contains distinctive diderm (double-membrane) Gram-negative bacteria, most of which have long, helically coiled (corkscrew-shaped or spiraled, hence the name) cells. Spirochaetes are chemoheterotrophic in nature, with lengths between 3 and 500 μm and diameters around 0.09 to at least 3 μm.

Spirochaetes are distinguished from other bacterial phyla by the location of their flagella, called endoflagella, or periplasmic flagella, which are sometimes called axial filaments. Endoflagella are anchored at each end (pole) of the bacterium within the periplasmic space (between the inner and outer membranes) where they project backwards to extend the length of the cell. These cause a twisting motion which allows the spirochaete to move. When reproducing, a spirochaete will undergo asexual transverse binary fission. Most spirochaetes are free-living and anaerobic, but there are numerous exceptions. Spirochaete bacteria are diverse in their pathogenic capacity and the ecological niches that they inhabit, as well as molecular characteristics including guanine-cytosine content and genome size.

== Pathogenicity ==
Many organisms within the Spirochaetota phylum cause prevalent diseases. Pathogenic members of this phylum include the following:

- Leptospira species, which causes leptospirosis
- Borrelia burgdorferi, B. mayonii, B. bissettiae, B. garinii, B. afzelii, B. spielmanii, B. lusitaniae, which cause Lyme disease.
- Borrelia recurrentis, which causes relapsing fever
- Treponema pallidum subspecies which cause treponematoses such as syphilis and yaws.
- Brachyspira pilosicoli and Brachyspira aalborgi, which cause intestinal spirochaetosis

Salvarsan, the first partially organic synthetic antimicrobial drug in medical history, was effective against spirochaetes and primarily used to cure syphilis. Additionally, oral spirochaetes are known to play a significant role in the pathogenesis of human periodontal disease.

== Taxonomy and molecular signatures ==
The class currently consists of 14 validly named genera across four orders and five families. The orders Brachyspirales, Brevinematales and Leptospirales each contain a single family, Brachyspiraceae, Brevinemataceae and Leptospiraceae, respectively. The Spirochaetales order harbours two families, Spirochaetaceae and Borreliaceae. Molecular markers in the form of conserved signature indels (CSIs) and CSPs have been found specific for each of the orders, with the exception of Brevinimetales, that provide a reliable means to demarcate these clades from one another within the diverse phylum. Additional CSIs have been found exclusively shared by each family within the Spirochaetales. These molecular markers are in agreement with the observed phylogenetic tree branching of two monophyletic clades within the Spirochaetales order. CSIs have also been found that further differentiate taxonomic groups within the Borreliaceae family that further delineate evolutionary relationships that are in accordance with physical characteristics such as pathogenicity (viz. Borrelia emend. Borreliella gen. nov.). However, this study has been criticized, and other studies using different approaches do not support the proposed split. The new naming system for the Lyme and relapsing fever Borrelia has not been adopted by the scientific literature.

A CSI has also been found exclusively shared by all Spirochaetota species. This CSI is a three-amino-acid insert in the flagellar basal body rod protein FlgC which is an important part of the unique endoflagellar structure shared by Spirochaetota species. Given that the CSI is exclusively shared by members within this phylum, it has been postulated that it may be related to the characteristic flagellar properties observed among Spirochaetota species.

Historically, all families belonging to the Spirochaetota phylum were assigned to a single order, the Spirochaetales. However, the current taxonomic view is more connotative of accurate evolutionary relationships. The distribution of a CSI is indicative of shared ancestry within the clade for which it is specific. It thus functions as a synapomorphic characteristic, so that the distributions of different CSIs provide the means to identify different orders and families within the phylum and so justify the phylogenetic divisions.

== Phylogeny ==
16S rRNA based LTP_10_2024

- Brevinematia
  - Brevinematales
    - Brevinemataceae
      Brevinema
    - Thermospiraceae
      Thermospira

- Spirochaetia
  - - Leptospirales
      - Leptospiraceae
        - Turneriella
        - - Leptonema
          - Leptospira
  - - - "Exilispirales"
        - "Exilispiraceae"
          Exilispira
      - Brachyspirales
        - Brachyspiraceae
          Brachyspira
    - - Spirochaetales
        - - - Sphaerochaetaceae
              - Pleomorphochaeta
              - - Bullifex
                - Sphaerochaeta
          - - - Rectinemataceae
                Rectinema
            - - Breznakiellaceae
                - - Gracilinema
                  - Zuelzera
                - - Breznakiella
                  - - Treponema primitia
                    - - Helmutkoenigia
                      - Leadbettera
              - Treponemataceae
                - - - Brucepastera
                    - Teretinema
                  - Treponema
                - Treponema species-group 2
        - - - Marispirochaetaceae
              Marispirochaeta
            - Sediminispirochaetaceae
              Sediminispirochaeta
          - - Spirochaeta thermophila
            - - - - Salinispiraceae
                    - Spirochaeta lutea
                    - Salinispira
                  - Spirochaetaceae
                    Spirochaeta
                - - Alkalispirochaetaceae
                    - Spirochaeta halophila
                    - Alkalispirochaeta
              - - Spirochaeta aurantia
                - - - Spirochaetaceae 2
                      - Spirochaeta cellobiosiphila
                      - - Oceanispirochaeta
                        - - Thiospirochaeta
                          - Spirochaeta species-group 2
                  - - "Entomospiraceae"
                      Entomospira
                    - Borreliaceae
                      - Borrelia
                      - Borreliella

120 marker proteins based GTDB 10-RS226

- - "Leptospirae"
    - Leptospiria
      - Turneriellales
        - Turneriellaceae
          Turneriella
      - Leptospirales
        - Leptonemataceae
          Leptonema
        - Leptospiraceae
          Leptospira
  - "Euspirochaetae"
    - - Brevinematia
        - Brevinematales
          - Brevinemataceae
            Brevinema
          - Thermospiraceae
            Thermospira
    - - - Brachyspiria
          - Brachyspirales
            - Brachyspiraceae
              Brachyspira
      - - "Exilispiria"
          - "Exilispirales"
            - "Exilispiraceae"
              Exilispira
        - Spirochaetia
          - - Borreliales
              - Borreliaceae
                - Borrelia
                - Borreliella
          - - - SP‑2023
                - SP‑2023
                  "Ca. Haliotispira"
            - - - "Entomospirales"
                  - "Entomospiraceae"
                    Entomospira
              - - - Spirochaetales_E
                    - - "Thiospirochaetaceae"
                        Thiospirochaeta
                    - - DSM‑2461
                        Spirochaeta_F
                      - Spirochaetaceae_B
                        Oceanispirochaeta
                - - - DSM‑17781
                      - DSM‑17781
                        Spirochaeta cellobiosiphila
                  - - - Winmispirales
                        - Winmispiraceae
                          Winmispira
                      - "Salinispirales"
                        - - DSM‑8902
                            Spirochaeta africana
                          - "Salinispiraceae"
                            - Spirochaeta lutea
                            - Salinispira
                        - - "Alkalispirochaetaceae"
                            Alkalispirochaeta
                    - - - - "Sediminispirochaetales"
                            - Sediminispirochaetaceae
                              Sediminispirochaeta
                        - - UBA9216
                            - UBA9216
                              "Ca. Thalassospirochaeta"
                          - "Marispirochaetales"
                            - Marispirochaetaceae
                              Marispirochaeta
                      - - Sphaerochaetales
                          - Sphaerochaetaceae
                            - - Parasphaerochaeta
                              - Sphaerochaeta
                            - - Bullifex
                              - "Ca. Ornithospirochaeta"
                        - Treponematales
                          - - Rectinemataceae
                              Rectinema
                          - - Breznakiellaceae
                              - Gracilinema
                              - - Treponema primitia
                                - - Breznakiella
                                  - Leadbettera
                            - Treponemataceae
                              - - "Ca. Gallitreponema"
                                - Treponema_C, D, E, F
                              - - - "Ca. Avitreponema"
                                  - - Brucepastera
                                    - Teretinema
                                - Treponema

== Taxonomy ==
The currently accepted taxonomy is based on the List of Prokaryotic names with Standing in Nomenclature (LPSN) and National Center for Biotechnology Information (NCBI).

- Phylum Spirochaetota Garrity and Holt 2021
  - Genus ?"Spirosymplokos" Guerrero et al. 1993
  - Class Leptospiria Chuvochina et al. 2024
    - Order Turneriellales Chuvochina et al. 2024
      - Family Turneriellaceae Chuvochina et al. 2024
        - Genus Turneriella Levett et al. 2005
    - Order Leptospirales Gupta et al. 2014
      - Family Leptonemataceae Chuvochina et al. 2024
        - Genus Leptonema Hovind-Hougen 1983
      - Family Leptospiraceae Hovind-Hougen 1979
        - Genus Leptospira Noguchi 1917
  - Class Brevinematia Chuvochina et al. 2024
    - Order Brevinematales Gupta et al. 2014
      - Family "Longinemataceae" Karnachuk et al. 2021
        - Genus ?"Longinema" corrig. Karnachuk et al. 2021
      - Family Brevinemataceae Paster 2012
        - Genus Brevinema Defosse et al. 1995
      - Family Thermospiraceae Ben Ali Gam et al. 2023
        - Genus Thermospira Ben Ali Gam et al. 2023
  - Class Brachyspiria Chuvochina et al. 2024
    - Order Brachyspirales corrig. Gupta et al. 2014
      - Family Brachyspiraceae Paster 2012
        - Genus ?"Ca. Maribrachyspira" Matsuyama et al. 2017
        - Genus Brachyspira Hovind-Hougen et al. 1982 non Foliella non Pfeiffer 1855
  - Class Spirochaetia Paster 2020
    - Order Spirochaetales Buchanan 1917
      - Family "Pillotinaceae" Margulis & Hinkle 1992
        - Genus ?Pillotina Hollande and Gharagozlou 1967 ex Bermudes et al. 1988
      - Family Spirochaetaceae Swellengrebel 1907 ["Thiospirochaetaceae" Pallen, Rodriguez-R & Alikhan 2022]
        - Genus ?"Ca. Allospironema" Paster & Dewhirst 2000
        - Genus ?"Canaleparolina" Wier, Ashen & Margulis 2000
        - Genus ?Clevelandina Bermudes et al. 1988
        - Genus ?Diplocalyx Gharagozlou 1968 ex Bermudes et al. 1988 non Richard 1850 non Presl 1845
        - Genus ?Hollandina To et al. 1978 ex Bermudes et al. 1988 non Haynes 1956
        - Genus ?"Mobilifilum" Margulis et al. 1990
        - Genus ?Rarispira Podosokorskaya et al. 2025
        - Genus ?"Spirophis" (Warming 1875) Lauterborn 1916
        - Genus ?Spirochaeta Ehrenberg 1835 em. Pikuta et al. 2009 non Turczaninow 1851
        - Genus "Ca. Haliotispira" Sharma et al. 2024
    - Order "Exilispirales" Pallen, Rodriguez-R & Alikhan 2022
      - Family "Exilispiraceae" Pallen, Rodriguez-R & Alikhan 2022
        - Genus Exilispira Imachi et al. 2008
    - Order Borreliales Chuvochina et al. 2024
      - Family Borreliaceae Gupta et al. 2014
        - Genus Borrelia Swellengrebel 1907 (relapsing fever Borrelia, reptile-associated Borrelia and Echidna-associated Borrelia)
        - Genus Borreliella Adeolu & Gupta 2015 (Lyme disease Borrelia)
        - Genus ?Cristispira Gross 1910
    - Order "Entomospirales" Pallen, Rodriguez-R & Alikhan 2022 [WRBN01]
      - Family "Entomospiraceae" Pallen, Rodriguez-R & Alikhan 2022
        - Genus Entomospira Grana-Miraglia et al. 2024 non Enderlein 1917
    - Order "Salinispirales" Pallen, Rodriguez-R & Alikhan 2022 [DSM-27196]
      - Family "Thiospirochaetaceae" Pallen, Rodriguez-R & Alikhan 2022 [DSM-19205]
        - Genus Oceanispirochaeta Subhash & Lee 2017b
        - Genus "Ca. Thalassospirochaeta" Pragya et al. 2024
        - Genus Thiospirochaeta Dubinina et al. 2020
      - Family Alkalispirochaetceae Chuvochina et al. 2024
        - Genus Alkalispirochaeta Sravanthi et al. 2016
      - Family Salinispiraceae Chuvochina et al. 2024
        - Genus Salinispira Ben Hania et al. 2015
    - Order Winmispirales Podosokorskaya et al. 2025 [DSM-6578]
      - Family Winmispiraceae Podosokorskaya et al. 2025
        - Genus Winmispira Podosokorskaya et al. 2025
    - Order "Sediminispirochaetales" Pallen, Rodriguez-R & Alikhan 2022
      - Family Sediminispirochaetaceae Chuvochina et al. 2024
        - Genus Sediminispirochaeta Shivani et al. 2016
    - Order "Marispirochaetales" Pallen, Rodriguez-R & Alikhan 2022
      - Family Marispirochaetaceae Chuvochina et al. 2024
        - Genus Marispirochaeta Shivani et al. 2017
    - Order Sphaerochaetales Chuvochina et al. 2024
      - Family Sphaerochaetaceae Hördt et al. 2020
        - Genus Bullifex Wylensek et al. 2021 [incl. "Ca. Aphodenecus" Gilroy et al. 2021]
        - Genus "Ca. Ornithospirochaeta" Gilroy et al. 2021
        - Genus Parasphaerochaeta Bidzhieva et al. 2020
        - Genus ?"Ca. Physcosoma" Gilroy et al. 2022
        - Genus ?Pleomorphochaeta Arroua et al. 2016
        - Genus Sphaerochaeta Ritalahti et al. 2012
    - Order Treponematales Chuvochina et al. 2024
      - Family Rectinemataceae Brune et al. 2022
        - Genus Rectinema Koelschbach et al. 2017
      - Family Breznakiellaceae Brune et al. 2022
        - Genus Breznakiella Song et al. 2022
        - Genus Gracilinema Brune et al. 2022
        - Genus ?Helmutkoenigia Brune et al. 2022
        - Genus Leadbettera Brune et al. 2022
        - Genus ?"Propulsinema" Fu et al. 2025
        - Genus ?Zuelzera Brune et al. 2022
      - Family Treponemataceae Robinson 1948
        - Genus "Ca. Avitreponema" Gilroy et al. 2021
        - Genus Brucepastera Song et al. 2023
        - Genus "Ca. Gallitreponema" Gilroy et al. 2021
        - Genus Teretinema Song et al. 2023
        - Genus Treponema Schaudinn 1905 em. Abt et al. 2013

== See also ==
- List of bacteria genera
- List of bacterial orders
- Bacteriology
- Borrelia
- Brevinema andersonii
- Flagellum
- Lyme disease microbiology
- Pinta (disease)
- Prokaryote
- Syphilis
- Treponema pallidum
- Yaws
