= Borreliaceae =

Scientific classification
- Domain: Bacteria
- Kingdom: Pseudomonadati
- Phylum: Spirochaetota
- Class: Spirochaetia
- Order: Spirochaetales
- Family: Borreliaceae; Gupta et al. 2014

Genera
- Borrelia; Borreliella; Cristispira

Synonyms
- "Cristispiraceae" Pribram 1929; "Spironemaceae" Gross 1910

Family of bacteria

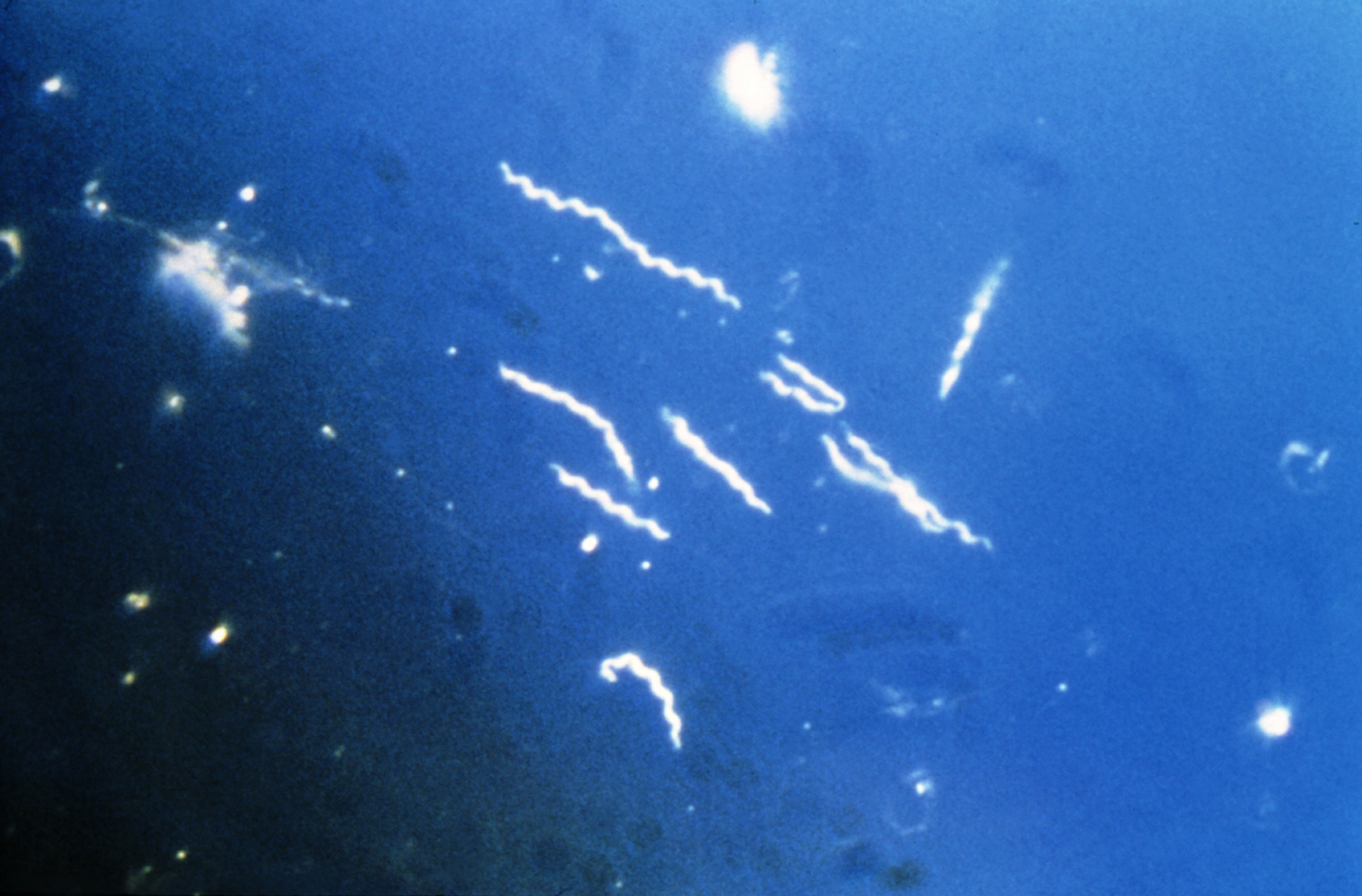
Borrelia burgdorferi

The Borreliaceae are a family of spirochete bacteria.

== See also ==
- List of bacteria genera
- List of bacterial orders
