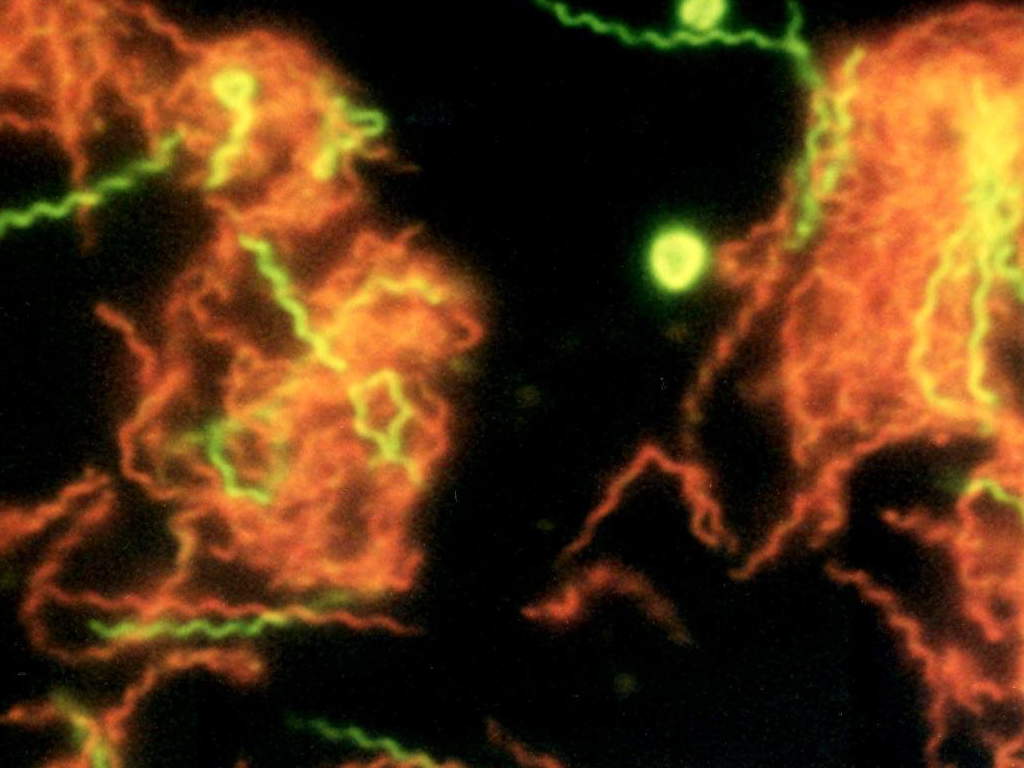
- A microscopic photograph of fluorescent-stained Spirochaeta americana

Scientific classification
- Domain: Bacteria
- Kingdom: Pseudomonadati
- Phylum: Spirochaetota (Spirochaetes)
- Class: Spirochaetia
- Order: Spirochaetales; Buchanan 1917 (Approved Lists 1980)

Families
- See text

Synonyms
- Borreliales Chuvochina et al. 2024; Sphaerochaetales Chuvochina et al. 2024; Treponematales Chuvochina et al. 2024; Winmispirales Podosokorskaya et al. 2025

= Spirochaetales =

Order of bacteria

The Spirochaetales are an order of spirochete bacteria. Some species within this order are known to causes syphilis, Lyme disease, relapsing fever, and other illnesses.

== Phylogeny ==
The currently accepted taxonomy is based on the List of Prokaryotic names with Standing in Nomenclature (LPSN) and National Center for Biotechnology Information (NCBI).

16S rRNA based LTP_10_2024

- Spirochaetales
  - - - Sphaerochaetaceae
    - - - Rectinemataceae
      - - Breznakiellaceae
        - Treponemataceae
  - - - Marispirochaetaceae
      - Sediminispirochaetaceae
    - - Spirochaeta thermophila
      - - - - Salinispiraceae
            - Spirochaetaceae
          - - Alkalispirochaetaceae
        - - Spirochaeta aurantia
          - - - "Thiospirochaetaceae"
            - - "Entomospiraceae"
              - Borreliaceae

120 marker proteins based GTDB 10-RS226

- - - Borreliales
      Borreliaceae
  - - - "SP‑2023"
        "Ca. Haliotispira" {"SP-2023"}
    - - - "Entomospirales"
          "Entomospiraceae"
      - - - Spirochaetales_E
            - "Thiospirochaetaceae"
            - - Spirochaeta_F {DSM-2461}
              - Oceanispirochaeta Spirochaetaceae_B
        - - - DSM‑17781
              Spirochaeta cellobiosiphila {DSM-17781}
          - - - Winmispirales
                Winmispiraceae
              - "Salinispirales"
                - Alkalispirochaetaceae
                - - Spirochaeta africana {DSM-8902}
                  - Salinispiraceae
            - - - - "Sediminispirochaetales"
                    Sediminispirochaetaceae
                - - UBA9216
                    "Ca. Thalassospirochaeta" {UBA9216}
                  - "Marispirochaetales"
                    Marispirochaetaceae
              - - Sphaerochaetales
                  Sphaerochaetaceae
                - Treponematales
                  - Rectinemataceae
                  - - Breznakiellaceae
                    - Treponemataceae

== See also ==
- List of bacteria genera
- List of bacterial orders
