= Targetoid =

Structure or lesion resembling a target

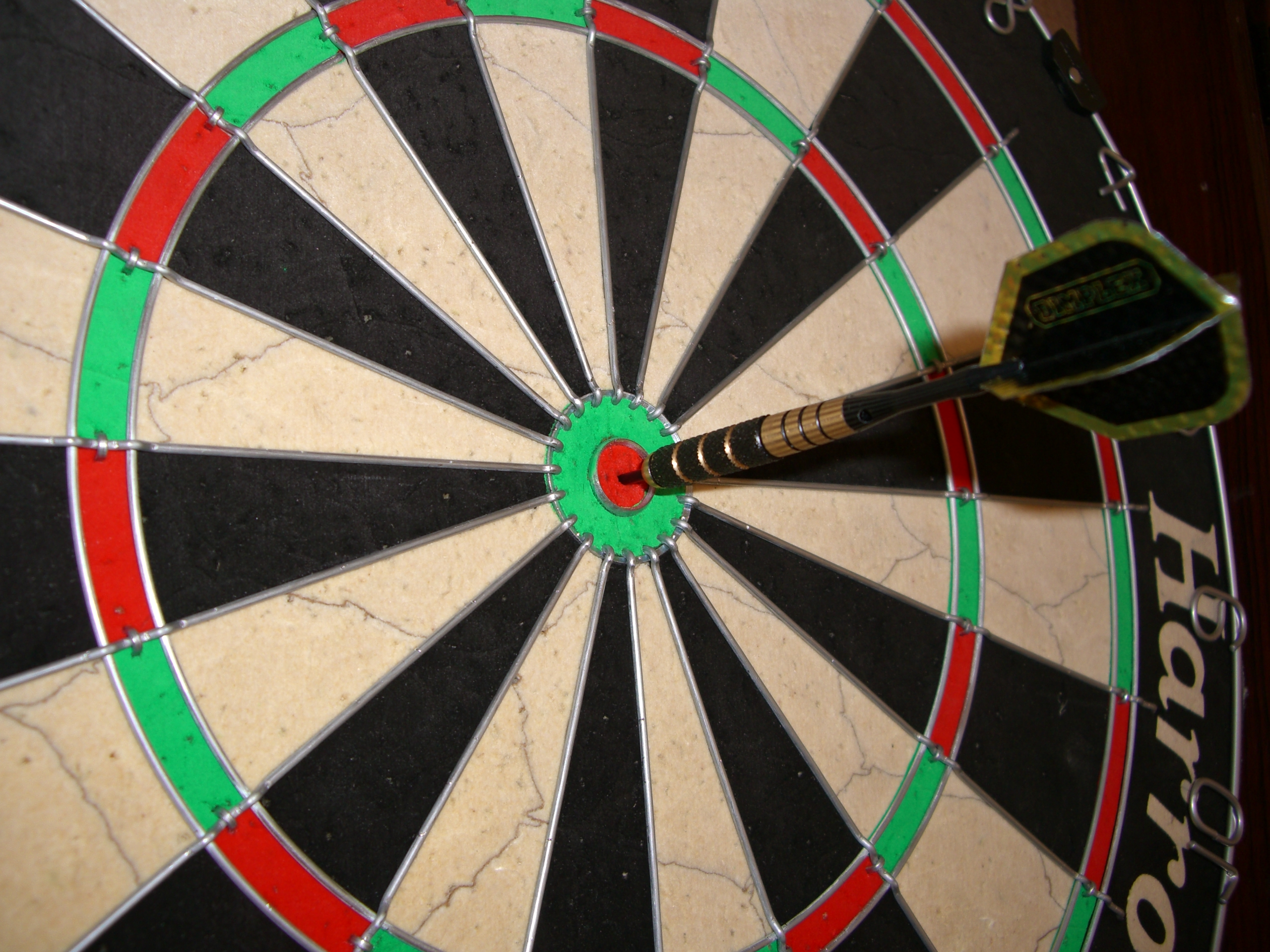
A dart in a target.

In medicine, a targetoid object is a structure or lesion that has the appearance of a target or is target-like.

Targetoid lesions are distinguished by a concentric ring-like appearance that resembles a target or bull's-eye. Classic target lesions with three concentric zones are commonly associated with erythema multiforme (a type of skin rash), while targetoid lesions with only two zones can appear in various dermatological conditions. Such lesions can be critical in diagnosing numerous skin disorders, ranging from infectious and inflammatory diseases to drug reactions and some neoplasms. Recognizing differences in morphology, distribution, and symptoms of targetoid lesions is important for accurate diagnosis and management of these distinctive skin lesions. The differential diagnosis of targetoid lesions is broad and includes conditions such as hives (urticaria), fixed drug eruptions, and lupus erythematosus.

== Michaelis-Gutmann bodies ==
The concept of targetoid structures applies not only to macroscopic skin lesions but also to microscopic features. For instance, the Michaelis-Gutmann body, a characteristic histological finding in malakoplakia, exhibits a targetoid or "bull's-eye" appearance under light microscopy. These intracellular and extracellular inclusions, composed of mineralized bacterial debris, illustrate how the targetoid pattern can manifest at both clinical and histopathological levels.

Michaelis-Gutmann bodies are generally 1–10 μm in size and appear as laminated or targetoid basophilic inclusions containing iron and calcium salts. Under light microscopy, they often exhibit a concentric "bird's-eye" or "owl-eye" (targetoid) appearance due to a central hydroxyapatite core. This targetoid structure results from mineralization of the matrix cores and the peripheral accumulation of phospholipids and microvesicles representing incompletely digested debris.

== Examples ==
Examples of targetoid lesions include:

- Target lesion
- Targetoid hemosiderotic hemangioma
- Targetoid Michaelis-Gutmann bodies
- Targetoid calcification
