= Forchheimer =

Forchheimer is a German surname. Notable people with the surname include:

- Frederick Forchheimer (1853–1913), American pediatrician
  - Forchheimer spots seen on the soft palate in some patients with rubella
- Philipp Forchheimer (1852–1933), Austrian engineer
  - Dupuit–Forchheimer assumption on groundwater flow
