= P-i mechanism =

The p-i concept refers to the pharmacological interaction of drugs with immune receptors. It explains a form of drug hypersensitivity, namely T cell stimulation, which can lead to various acute inflammatory manifestations such as exanthems, eosinophilia and systemic symptoms, Stevens–Johnson syndrome, toxic epidermal nercrolysis, and complications upon withdrawing the drug.

== Principle ==
The p-i concept links pharmacology with immunology: It implies that drugs bind directly, as an off-target activity to immune receptors which results in various forms of T cell stimulations. P-i thus starts with an off-target pharmacological activity of the drug followed by a cascade of immunological events which always starts with T cell activation, even if the drug did not bind to the T cell itself but to an antigen presenting cell (APC).

The drug bindings occur by non-covalent bonds (e.g. Hydrogen bonds, electrostatic interactions, van der Waals forces) to some of the highly polymorphic T cell receptors for antigen (TCR) and / or human leukocyte antigens (HLA). The binding occurs mostly on the cell surface and is labile, reversible and transient. It interacts with the crucial molecules of antigen dependent T cell activation, which may alter the self-HLA to make it look like an allo-HLA-allele, to which T cells strongly react; Some drug binding to TCR itself may – together with HLA-peptide interaction – elicit TCR-CDR signalling or alter the TCR conformation, thereby enhancing its interaction with HLA-peptide (allogeneic effect). Certain drugs may not only interact with the immune receptors on the surface but also inside the cell (endoplasmic reticulum e.g. Abacavir to HLA-B*57:01). This may cause a change of presented peptides (altered peptide model).

The polymorphism of the immune receptors explains to a large extent the unpredictability of drug hypersensitivity reactions (DHR), as some of the individually distinct protein sequences may bind the drug better than others. Thereby only those individuals react to the drug which express the fitting protein sequence, e.g. a certain HLA-allele.

Until now, only αβ TCR and HLA-class I and II proteins were described as target structures for p-i mediated drug hypersensitivity, but it is likely that other immune receptors (γδ-TCR, HLA-Class Ib, etc.) are also possible off target structures.

== History ==
=== Hapten concept ===
Originally, the immune stimulation by drugs were exclusively explained by the hapten concept, which was investigated in the early 1930s: In these early studies it was found that drugs were too small to represent an antigen inherently. Only if they or their metabolites are haptens, thereby forming larger and stable drug-protein complexes, were they seen as new antigens. Such a formation of a complete antigen (drug-protein complexes, so-called adducts) were considered a necessary step to stimulate an immune response, since the drug alone remained unnoticed by the immune cells.

One classical clinical model for a hapten reaction is contact dermatitis. This is a skin disease based on a localized immune reaction in the skin to a chemically reactive, topical applied compound, which binds by covalent bonds to a carrier protein; many of the contact sensitizers also have a toxic effect, which may be important for the costimulation of the immune system. Extensive in vitro and in vivo data support the hapten concept in contact dermatitis.

It was tempting to use the hapten model to explain generalized DH as well: The drug class most often involved in generalized DHR are penicillins. When applied to the skin, they elicit contact dermatitis. Penicillins are classical haptens and penicillin modified proteins like albumin have been repeatedly found in patients after therapy. Thus it was assumed that the generalized DHR upon parenteral or oral application after penicillins is also due to the hapten-feature of this drug class.

The “hapten-concept” was soon extended to explain all immune mediated (adverse drug reactions): Only if the drug or a metabolite could act as hapten and bind covalently to proteins, then was the drug considered to be able to elicit immune reactions including generalized exanthema, drug induced hepatitis, DRESS, SJS/TEN etc. Consequently, during preclinical risk assessment of a new drug, the potential drug candidate may be screened carefully for hapten-features, and if the candidate drugs caused some adverse immune mediated reaction, it was linked to their hapten feature or, if the parent compound lacked hapten characteristics, a hapten feature of a drug metabolite as cause for the DHR was postulated. Importantly, the hapten theory as explanation for all generalized immune reactions was often disputed and hard to reconcile with many experimental or clinical findings.

=== P-i concept ===
The p-i concept represents an alternative explanation of immune stimulation by drugs in DHR. It implies that no formation of a new antigen (hapten-protein complex) is needed to elicit an immune activation: T cells are stimulated by the drug binding to immune receptors directly, which leads to conformational changes of HLA and/or TCR as well as to signalling by the TCR-CD3 complex: The p-i concept was created and formulated by Prof. emeritus Werner J. Pichler in early 2000, based on studies with drug specific T cell clones, derived from patients with DHR. The underlying investigations were performed by various PhD students in Pichler's research group at the Inselspital/University of Bern in Bern, Switzerland. The essential, initial finding was that T cells from patients with DH showed a specific reaction to the incriminated drug in vitro (proliferation, cytotoxicity, cytokine release), and that this drug dependent stimulation of immune cells relied on labile (=non-covalent) binding of drugs to cell surface proteins, namely on antigen presenting cells and T cells, which were present in the cell culture.

That a non-covalent, and drug binding was sufficient for T cell stimulation was shown by three main findings underlying the lability of drug bindings: washing the cells in the cell culture (APCs, T cells) effectively removed the drugs, and the cells could not be stimulated any longer; This means that the drug was binding in a labile way, which was possible with the inert, parent compound; Transformation to a reactive metabolite was not needed to elicit a reaction: blocking processing or metabolism by drugs did not interfere with reactivity and even fixing the antigen presenting cells by glutaraldehyde failed to eliminate T cell reactivity; And lastly by the speed of reaction: the reaction occurred within minutes, before metabolism could happen; addition of the drug to the cell culture containing drug reactive T cells resulted in a Ca^{2+} influx in drug specific T cells within less than a minute.

Over the years this p-i concept could be confirmed by many functional and structural studies including crystallography, which localized the precise region of the immune receptor (HLA-B*57:01, TCRVβ20, etc.) to which a particular drug binds. Highly sensitive molecules of T cell activation are targeted, and complex and highly variable immunological consequences can develop: different types of T cells are activated to a variable degree, leading in inflammatory consequences with a highly polymorphic clinical picture of acute symptoms, followed by different late appearing complications.

== Type of T cell activation ==
The modification of the self-HLA, of TCR, or of the TCR-peptide-HLA complex by non-covalent, bindings of drugs is a reversible, transient process, whose effect is highly dependent on the affinity of drug-protein interactions. The drug can bind first to the HLA-peptide complex (p-i HLA) or the TCR complex (p-i TCR). Sometimes the drug may be trapped in between TCR and HLA.

P-i HLA is often linked with a striking HLA-association of the DHR (shown for abacavir, carbamazepine, allopurinol, dapson, vancomycin etc.), since the drug binds to a certain HLA-allele with higher affinity than to other HLA-molecules. P-i TCR is less investigated. Drug binding to certain parts of the TCR Vβ chains may be sufficient for full activation, if interaction with HLA-peptide complexes is possible; other p-i TCR bindings may require additional T cell activation (e.g. by viral infection) to lead to clinical symptoms.

The in vitro analysis of p-i using drug specific T cell clones (TCC) or TCR-transfected cell lines generated from patients with DH revealed a strong stimulation: A high level of T cell mediated cytotoxicity, a broad spectrum of secreted cytokines and polyclonality was observed; The p-i stimulation was unorthodox: some CD4+ T cells were uncharacteristically reacting to HLA-class I or CD8+ T cells to HLA-class II drug presentation or did not show strict HLA restriction, and some TCC were polyspecific (the reactive T cell clones reacted with various peptides): Altogether, the picture emerged that p-i induced T cell stimulations have features of allo-like immune stimulations (allo-stimulation).

== Clinical presentations of p-i reactions ==
=== Acute p-i stimulations ===
The two main clinical outcomes of acute p-i reactions are MPE/DRESS on one hand, and SJS/TEN on the other hand. In MPE/DRESS patients, high numbers of circulating, atypical (activated) lymphocytes and high levels of various cytokines can be found in the circulation. In vitro drug stimulation reveals a proliferating, high cytokine secreting, cytotoxic CD4 and CD8 T cell reaction to the incriminated drug, which sometimes can be detected for many years. Quite in contrast, patients with SJS/TEN may show lymphopenia, just the blister fluids are full of mainly CD8/NK+, cytotoxic T cells, which are able to kill keratinocytes. Cytotoxic molecules (granzyme B, perforin, granulysin) can be detected in vivo in blood and the blister fluid in the first few days of the disease. During the acute disease (1–2 weeks), the T cells still react in in-vitro assays, but after 3–4 weeks, the CD8 cell compartment, which is considered to be the main responsible cell population for the disease, appears to be exhausted and are refractory to drug stimulation. How this CD8 exhaustion is achieved is unknown.

=== Late complications of p-i stimulations ===
If the p-i stimulation resulted in T cell expansion and activation (MPE, DRESS), some of the p-i-activated T cells might continue to react in the absence of drug: their TCR may be cross-reactive with unmodified, self HLA presenting exogenous peptides (mainly of herpes virus origin) or some self-peptides: this kind of cross-reactivity with exogenous or self peptides and self-HLA explain two late complications after severe DHR, mostly DRESS: one is viral reactivation: herpes viruses are permanently harboured in various cell types after infection (fibroblasts, endothelial cells, hematopoietic cells, brain cells, etc.) and are controlled by T cells. When these herpes-virus specific T cells are activated by p-i, they react with the herpes virus peptide expressing cells and damage them by their cytotoxic potential: a consequence is the release virus particles into the circulation and symptoms of viral reactivation (high virus load, possibly increase of liver enzymes and of activated lymphocytes) appear.

A second wave of peptide reactivity may end up in autoimmunity: the abnormal stimulation by p-i includes T cells from the naïve and memory T cell pool. It may include self-peptide reactive T cells, which, if the corresponding self-peptides are presented and are encountered, release cytokines and exert cytotoxicity - autoimmunity may arise. As such self-peptide reactive T cells are present in relatively low amounts, they need >6–8 weeks to expand and appear after the virus-reactivations. Autoimmunity occurs in a minority of patients (<20%), and may is often manifested as autoimmune poly-endocrine syndrome.

Multiple drug hypersensitivity (MDH): a further consequence of p-i stimulations like DRESS or severe MPE is MDH; such patients develop an additional DHR to a structurally different drug, with the same or different clinical manifestations. MDH occurs in ca. 20% of patients with DRESS, and can occur any time, from the start of DRESS (often to a combination therapy), during the initial activation, and can even appear years after the first DHR

== Demonstration of p-i reactivity ==
A main difficulty of DHR research and weak point of the p-i concept is the fact that it is cumbersome to demonstrate a p-i reactivity – namely that the T cell stimulation occurred due to non-covalent drug binding to immune receptors. In principle, a T cell mediated DHR was explained by p-i if the drug binding to the immune receptors was found to be labile.

=== In vitro analysis ===
To demonstrate the lability of drug binding, drug specific T cell lines, T cell clones and TCR hybridoma cells were required. Washing of the cell mix of drug, APC and T cells abrogated p-i reactivity, while T cell reaction to haptens persisted. The presentation of peptides by HLA on APC takes > 4hr pulsing (uptake of hapten modified protein, processing and presentation), and may also require metabolism, if the stimulating drug was chemically inert and not a hapten. Therefore, an immediate reactivity of T cells (e.g. measured by rapid Ca^{2+} influx) as well as reactivity to the drug in the presence of protein and metabolism inhibitors or by using glutaraldehyde-fixed antigen presenting cells was interpreted as p-i reaction. P-i reactivity was demonstrated for a number of drugs (SMX, lidocain, lamotrigine, carbamazepine, various radio contrast media, quinolones, vancomycin, dapsone, etc.), including some drugs which can act via p-i or as hapten (piperacillin, flucloxacillin, amoxicillin, cephalosporins, monobactams). In these cases the p-i reactivity was responsible for more severe reactions like hepatitis in flucloxacillin/B*57:01 carriers or DRESS with amoxicillin and piperacillin

=== Clinical analysis ===
DRESS/SJS/TEN (severe DHR) and HLA-linked DHR are p-i. Initially it was thought that p-i reactions were the exception while the hapten mechanism represented the main cause of systemic T cell mediated DHR. Conversely it seems to be the opposite as p-i appears to be the main mechanism in T cell mediated DHR: Whenever the mechanism was investigated how drugs cause severe DHR (DRESS, SJS/TEN), it was always found to be due to p-i.

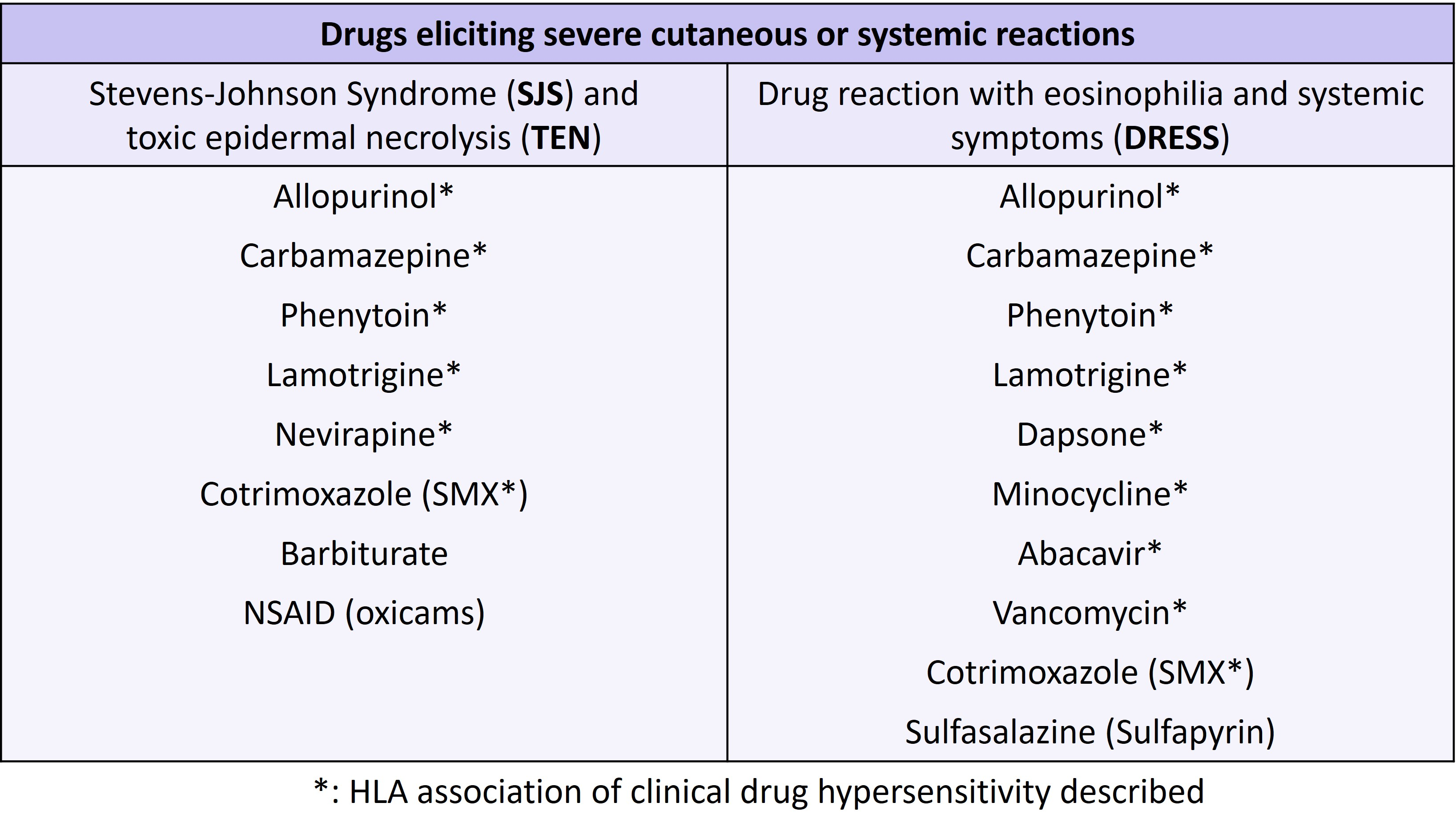
P-i drugs table

It is unclear whether the majority of severe MPE is due to p-i. As the in vitro analysis of amoxicillin induced MPE (analysis of >150 amoxicillin induced MPE) regularly reveals high secretions of IL-5, IL-13, IFNg, granzyme B and granulysin upon drug exposure (very similar to DRESS cases), the in vitro drug stimulation in MPE is often strong and includes the secretion of Th1, Th2, and cytotoxic cytokines simultaneously. It is actually often stronger and broader than the cytokine secretion upon tetanus control, and is reminiscent of an in vitro mixed leukocyte reaction (MLR). Further work is needed, but most MPE appear to be mediated by p-i.

Importantly, all drugs which develop DHR and have a strong HLA-linkage (e.g. allopurinol/oxypurinol and B*58:01) stimulate via p-i. Protein reactions are not HLA restricted: A protein is large and is processed into various small peptides. These peptides (including the hapten-modified peptides) fit into different HLA alleles and not in only one HLA like observed with drugs. Thus, the DHR-HLA linkage seen with certain drugs can only be explained by direct drug binding to an allele-typic region of the HLA-molecule. This was also confirmed in structural and computational studies. Importantly, if a drug can be stimulatory by p-i or by hapten mechanism (SMX/SMX-NO, beta-lactams), the severe T cell mediated symptoms are mediated by p-i and are HLA-allele restricted, while the hapten-reactions are not. Thus, the list of drugs acting via p-i and causing DHR is now longer than the list of hapten-like drugs (table).

First hapten, then non covalent drug binding: A strong argument for a hapten-mechanism underlying DHR was the ability of the drug to cause all, namely IgG, IgE and T cell mediated DHR, since these different immune reactions required the immunogenic presentation of the drug in various ways. This is best achieved using hapten (and thus antigenic) features of a drug. Indeed, the classical hapten-drugs beta-lactam antibiotics, SMX-NO, or PPI are able to induce all forms of Gell and Coombs immune stimulations, while e.g. classical and exclusive p-i drugs like carbamazepine or abacavir induce only T cell reactions, but never anaphylaxis. Importantly, an ability to act as hapten does not rule out that non-covalent binding like in p-i plays a role in DHR. Actually, during a DHR the type of drug-protein binding may change: A drug may act as hapten in the induction phase causing asymptomatic immunity, but the effector mechanism of immunoglobulin-reactions and some severe T-cell mediated DHR may actually be due to non-covalent drug bindings. Thus, beta-lactam antibiotics – the classical hapten-drugs - are the main elicitor for "fake antigen" reactions, drug induced immune thrombocytopenia (DITP) and p-i stimulations, which are all based on non-covalent drug-protein interactions and are not antigen induced.

The polyclonal T cells response stemming from the memory T cell pool includes T cells which are primed by prior immune responses. An important role play herpes viruses (HHV6, CMV, EBV, Herpes simplex I), where a relatively large amount of T cells are involved in the control of these herpes viruses. Indeed, herpes virus reactivation is so common, that it is part of the Japanese definition of DRESS. Since the precursor frequency of such herpes virus specific T cells is high (up to 10% of the CD8+ T cells in the elderly can be devoted to herpes virus control, symptoms due to such T cells appear already after ca. 2–6 weeks.
