= Eruptive hypomelanosis =

- Specialty: Dermatology, infectious disease

Eruptive hypomelanosis is a novel paraviral exanthem suspected to be related to viral infections. Most patients are young children aged two to ten. Most children develop prodromal symptoms similar to common cold or influenza. Small, monomorphous, and hypopigmented macules then erupt. There could be systemic manifestations like pharyngitis or enlargement of lymph nodes. Most children with eruptive hypomelanosis develop no complications. The epidemiology, aetiology, clinical manifestations, complication, infectivity, and management of eruptive hypomelanosis leave much space to be investigated.
