= Filatov's disease =

Filatov's disease may refer to:

- Dukes' disease
- Infectious mononucleosis
