= Pathognomonic =

Medical term meaning "characteristic for a particular disease"

Pathognomonic (synonym pathognomic) is a term, often used in medicine, that means "characteristic for a particular disease". A pathognomonic sign is a particular sign whose presence means that a particular disease is present beyond any doubt. The absence of a pathognomonic sign does not rule out the disease. Labelling a sign or symptom "pathognomonic" represents a marked intensification of a "diagnostic" sign or symptom.

The word is an adjective of Greek origin derived from πάθος pathos 'disease' and γνώμων gnomon 'indicator' (from γιγνώσκω gignosko 'I know, I recognize').

== Practical use ==
While some findings may be classic, typical or highly suggestive in a certain condition, they may not occur uniquely in this condition and therefore may not directly imply a specific diagnosis. A pathognomonic sign or symptom has very high positive predictive value and high specificity but does not need to have high sensitivity: for example it can sometimes be absent in a certain disease, since the term only implies that, when it is present, the doctor instantly knows the patient's illness. The presence of a pathognomonic finding allows immediate diagnosis, since there are no other conditions in the differential diagnosis.

Singular pathognomonic signs are relatively uncommon. Examples of pathognomonic findings include Koplik's spots inside the mouth in measles, the palmar xanthomata seen on the hands of people suffering from hyperlipoproteinemia, Negri bodies within brain tissue infected with rabies, or a tetrad of rash, arthralgia, abdominal pain and kidney disease in a child with Henoch–Schönlein purpura, or succinylacetone for Tyrosinemia Type I.

As opposed to symptoms (reported subjectively by the patient and not measured) and signs (observed by the physician at the bedside on physical exam, without need for a report) a larger number of medical test results are pathognomonic. An example is the hypersegmented neutrophil, which is seen only in megaloblastic anemias (not a single disease, but a set of closely related disease states). More often a test result is "pathognomonic" only because there has been a consensus to define the disease state in terms of the test result (such as diabetes mellitus being defined in terms of chronic fasting blood glucose levels).

In contrast, a test with very high sensitivity rarely misses a condition, so a negative result should be reassuring (the disease tested for is absent). A sign or symptom with very high sensitivity is often termed sine qua non. An example of such test is a genetic test to find an underlying mutation in certain types of hereditary colon cancer.

== Examples ==
Disease	Sign
Cytomegalovirus infection	Owl's eye appearance of inclusion bodies
Lyme disease	Erythema chronicum migrans
Inclusion body myositis	Filamentous material seen in inclusion bodies under electron microscopy
Hypocalcemia	Trousseau sign and Chvostek sign
Tetanus or strychnine poisoning	Risus sardonicus
Measles	Koplik's spots
Wilson's disease	Kayser–Fleischer ring
Diphtheria	Pseudomembrane on tonsils, pharynx and nasal cavity
Chronic hemorrhagic pancreatitis	Grey-Turner's sign (ecchymosis in flank area)
Cholera	Rice-watery stool
Enteric fever	Rose spots in abdomen
Meningitis	Kernig's sign and Brudzinski's sign
Angina pectoris	Levine's sign (hand clutching of chest)
Patent ductus arteriosus	Machine-like murmur
Parkinson's disease	Pill-rolling tremors
Whipple's disease	Oculo-masticatory myorhythmia
Acute myeloid leukemia	Auer rod
Multiple sclerosis	Bilateral internuclear ophthalmoplegia
Pericarditis	Pericardial friction rub
Rheumatic fever	Aschoff bodies
Rabies	Hydrophobia and Negri bodies
Gout	Tophi
Acute tubular necrosis	Muddy brown casts
Granulosa cell tumour	Call-Exner bodies
Malakoplakia	Michaelis–Gutmann bodies
Narcolepsy (with cataplexy)	Cataplexy
Endodermal sinus tumor	Schiller–Duval body
Parkinson's disease	Rigidity with tremor
Atrial flutter	Flutter waves
Sickle cell disease	Vaso-occlusive crises
Lightning injury	Lichtenberg figure on skin

== See also ==
- AIDS-defining clinical condition
- List of eponymous medical signs
- Medical sign
