= Retinal degeneration =

Retinal degeneration may refer to:

- Retinopathy, one of several eye diseases or eye disorders in humans
  - Retinal degeneration (rhodopsin mutation)
- Progressive retinal atrophy, an eye disease in dogs

== See also ==
- List of systemic diseases with ocular manifestations, in humans
