= List of systemic diseases with ocular manifestations =

An ocular manifestation of a systemic disease is an eye condition that directly or indirectly results from a disease process in another part of the body. There are many diseases known to cause ocular or visual changes. Diabetes, for example, is the leading cause of new cases of blindness in those aged 20–74, with ocular manifestations such as diabetic retinopathy and macular edema affecting up to 80% of those who have had the disease for 15 years or more. Other diseases such as acquired immunodeficiency syndrome (AIDS) and hypertension are commonly found to have associated ocular symptoms.

== Systemic allergic diseases ==
- Asthma
- Atopic dermatitis
- Atopic eczema
- Hay fever
- Urticaria
- Vernal conjunctivitis

== Skin and mucous membrane diseases ==
- Acne rosacea
- Albinism
- Atopic dermatitis
- Behçet's disease
- Cicatricial pemphigoid
- Ehlers–Danlos syndrome
- Epidermolysis bullosa
- Erythema multiforme
- Goltz–Gorlin syndrome
- Ichthyosis
- Incontinentia pigmenti
- Nevus of Ota
- Pemphigus
- Pseudoxanthoma elasticum
- Psoriasis
- Stevens–Johnson syndrome (Erythema multiforme major)
- Vogt–Koyanagi–Harada syndrome
- Xeroderma pigmentosum

== Phacomatoses ==
- Angiomatosis retinae (Von Hippel–Lindau disease) (retinocerebellar capillary hemangiomatosis)
- Ataxia telangiectasia (Louis–Bar syndrome)
- Encephalotrigeminal angiomatosis (Sturge–Weber syndrome) (encephalofacial cavernous hemangiomatosis)
- Neurofibromatosis (von Recklinghausen's disease)
- Tuberous sclerosis (Bourneville's syndrome)
- Wyburn–Mason syndrome (racemose hemangiomatosis)

== Collagen diseases ==
- Ankylosing spondylitis
- Dermatomyositis
- Periarteritis nodosa
- Reactive arthritis
- Rheumatoid arthritis
- Ehlers-Danlos Syndrome
- Sarcoidosis
- Scleroderma
- Systemic lupus erythematosus
- Temporal arteritis
- Relapsing polychondritis
- Granulomatosis with polyangiitis 50-60% have ophthalmologic manifestations, which can be a presenting feature in a minority of patients. Orbital disease is the most common manifestation, and may result in proptosis, restrictive ophthalmopathy, chronic orbital pain, and in chronic cases, orbital retraction syndrome and intractable socket pain. Granulomatosis with polyangiitis may also cause inflammation of the optic nerve, ophthalmoplegia, conjunctivitis, keratitis, scleritis, episcleritis, dacrocystitis, nasolacrimnal duct obstruction, dacroadenitis, uveitis, and retinal vasculitis.

== Systemic viral infections ==
- Varicella (chickenpox)
- Rubeola (measles)
- Rubella (German measles)
- Variola (smallpox)
- Vaccinia
- Herpes simplex
- Herpes zoster
- Mumps
- Infectious mononucleosis
- Influenza
- Cytomegalic inclusion disease
- Pharyngoconjunctival fever (adenovirus 3)
- Epidemic keratoconjunctivitis (adenovirus 8)
- Human immunodeficiency virus (acquired immunodeficiency syndrome)
- Ebola
- Rift Valley Fever
- Dengue
- Hantavirus

== Systemic bacterial infections ==
- Gonorrhea (ophthalmia neonatorum)
- Brucellosis
- Diphtheria
- Lyme disease
- Sepsis (bacterial metastatic endophthalmitis)
- Tularemia
- Leprosy (Hansen's disease)
- Tuberculosis
- Syphilis

== Systemic protozoal infections ==
- Lymphogranuloma venereum (chlamydial)
- Inclusion conjunctivitis (chlamydial)
- Malaria
- Toxoplasmosis

== Systemic fungal infections ==
- Candida albicans
- Histoplasmosis
- Coccidioidomycosis
- Cryptococcus
- Metastatic fungal endophthalmitis
- Actinomyces
- Streptothrix

== Systemic cestode and nematode infections ==
- Cysticercosis (tapeworm)
- Echinococcosis (hydatid cyst)
- Toxocariasis (toxocara)
- Trichinosis (trichinella)
- Onchocerciasis
- Loiasis (loa loa)

== Chromosomal disorders and genetic syndromes ==
- Cri-du chat syndrome
- Schmid–Fraccaro syndrome
- Turner's syndrome
- Ring-D chromosome
- Monosomy-G syndrome
- Trisomy 13 (Patau's syndrome, D-syndrome)
- Trisomy 18 (Edwards' syndrome, E-syndrome)
- Trisomy 21 (Down syndrome)
- Deletion of long arm of chromosome 18
- Deletion of chromosome 18
- Ciliopathic genetic syndromes—A number of widely variant genetic disorders with occular phenotypes have been identified with genotypical ciliopathy.

== Hematologic diseases ==
- Anemia

== Cardiovascular diseases ==
- Cardiovascular diseases

- Arteriosclerosis
- Hypertension
- Pre-eclampsia (toxemia of pregnancy)

- Occlusive vascular disease (sudden)

- Emboli and thrombi
- Central retinal artery occlusion
- Cardiac myxoma
- Cranial arteritis
- Sickle cell attack

- Occlusive vascular disease (slow, progressive)

- Carotid artery disease
- Arterial spasm (TIA)
- Diabetes mellitus
- Collagen diseases

- Venous occlusive disease

- Thrombosis
- Use of hormonal contraception

- Endocarditis
- Myxoma
- Aortic arch syndrome (takayasu)
- Pre-eclampsia (toxemia of pregnancy)
- Thromboangiitis obliterans
- Hereditary telangiectasia (Rendu–Osler–Weber syndrome)

== Endocrine diseases ==
- Cushing's disease
- Addison's disease
- Diabetes mellitus
- Hyperparathyroidism
- Hypoparathyroidism
- Hyperthyroidism
- Hypothyroidism

== Gastrointestinal and nutritional disorders ==
- Alcoholism
- Crohn's disease
- Liver disease
- Malnutrition
- Peptic ulcer disease
- Pancreatic disease
- Regional enteritis or ulcerative colitis
- Vitamin A deficiency
- Vitamin B deficiency
- Vitamin C deficiency
- Hypervitaminosis A, B, and D
- Whipple's disease

== Metabolic disorders ==
- Albinism
- Alkaptonuria
- Amyloidosis
- Chediak–Higashi syndrome
- Cystinosis
- Fabry's disease
- Galactosemia
- Gaucher's disease
- Gout
- Hemochromatosis
- Histiocytosis
- Homocystinuria
- Lipidoses
- Marfan's syndrome
- Weill–Marchesani syndrome
- Mucopolysaccharidosis
- Niemann–Pick disease
- Osteogenesis imperfecta
- Wilson's disease

== Musculoskeletal disease ==
- Albright's disease (fibrous dysplasia of bone)
- Apert syndrome
- Conradi's syndrome
- Craniofacial syndromes
- Myasthenia gravis
- Osteogenesis imperfecta
- Paget's disease
- Osteoporosis

== Pulmonary diseases ==
- Asthma
- Bronchogenic carcinoma
- Bronchiectasis
- Cystic fibrosis of the pancreas
- Emphysema
- Pneumonias
- Tuberculosis

== Renal disease ==
- Alport's syndrome
- Azotemia (acute and chronic pyelonephritis)
- Lowe's syndrome
- Medullary cystic disease
- Nephrotic syndrome (acute glomerulonephritis, diabetic kidney, system lupus erythematosus)
- Renal transplantation
- Wilms' tumor (nephroblastoma)

== Neoplastic diseases with ocular metastases ==
- Carcinoma and sites of primary lesions
- Blood

- Leukemia
- Lymphoma

- Breast
- Colon
- Kidney
- Lung
- Genital organs

- Ovary or cervix
- Testis or prostate

- Skin

- Melanoma

- Gut

- Stomach
- Pancreas

- Thyroid

== See also ==
- List of cutaneous conditions
