= Stari =

Stari (Slavic languages, 'Old One') may refer to:

- Stari, a rural locality in Babushkinsky District of Vologda Oblast of Russia
- Stari, a nickname of Đuro Pucar
- Stari, a nickname of Josip Broz Tito

== See also ==
- Southern tick-associated rash illness
