= Targetoid hemosiderotic hemangioma =

- Other names: Hobnail hemangioma
- Specialty: Dermatology

Targetoid hemosiderotic hemangioma, also known as a hobnail hemangioma, is a skin condition characterized by a central brown or purplish papule that is surrounded by an ecchymotic halo. It may appear similar to melanoma. It was first described by Santa Cruz and Aronberg in 1988.

== Signs and symptoms ==
Targetoid hemosiderotic hemangioma manifests as a single, tiny, reddish-violaceous to brown targetoid lesion that can grow centrifugally in the acute phase is encircled by a hemorrhagic halo. The halo may vanish in later phases, leaving just a central papule. There have been reports of certain cases without targetoid development. Targetoid hemosiderotic hemangioma typically develops over the trunk and extremities. The majority of these lesions have a diameter of less than 1 cm.

== Causes ==
Although the precise etiology of targetoid hemosiderotic hemangioma is uncertain, trauma has been suggested as one of the primary causes of the targetoid look. Trauma may result in the production of microshunts, wherein the capillary pressure fills the lesion's lymph spaces with erythrocytes, hence promoting the formation of aneurysmal microstructures. There would be interstitial hemosiderin deposits, fibrosis, and inflammation if certain efferent lymphatic veins were blocked. These tumors may potentially be amplified by hormones.

== Diagnosis ==
Red or reddish-blue lakes are clearly visible on dermoscopy, depending on how much of the dermis is involved. Hemorrhagic crusts can also be observed as black macules.

Depending on the developmental stage at which the lesion was biopsied, histology varies. There is a biphasic pattern in the early stages: in the papillary dermis, the vascular spaces are dilated and slit-like, resembling lymphatic vessels, which are concentrated around sweat glands and frequently form small hemangiomatous nodules, dissecting the collagen bundles. In the deep dermis, the vascular spaces are angulated and slit-like, resembling lymphatic vessels, with solid intraluminal projections and a hobnail appearance. There are fibrin thrombi, inflammatory lymphocytic aggregates, and extensive red blood cell extravasation. Later stages show significant hemosiderin deposition in the stroma, fibrosis, and a collapsed appearance of the arterial lumen.

Clinical differential diagnoses include infantile hemangioma, melanocytic lesions, tufted angioma, insect bite, Kaposi sarcoma, erythema multiforme, and dermatofibroma, depending on the stage of evolution. The histological differential diagnoses include epithelioid hemangioma, early Kaposi's sarcoma, progressive lymphangioma, and well-differentiated angiosarcoma.

== Treatment ==
Simple excision is curative and enables for accurate histological diagnosis. These lesions are solely removed for diagnostic or cosmetic purposes because the condition is benign.

== See also ==
- Skin lesion
- List of cutaneous conditions
