= Henry Koplik =

American physician (1858–1927)

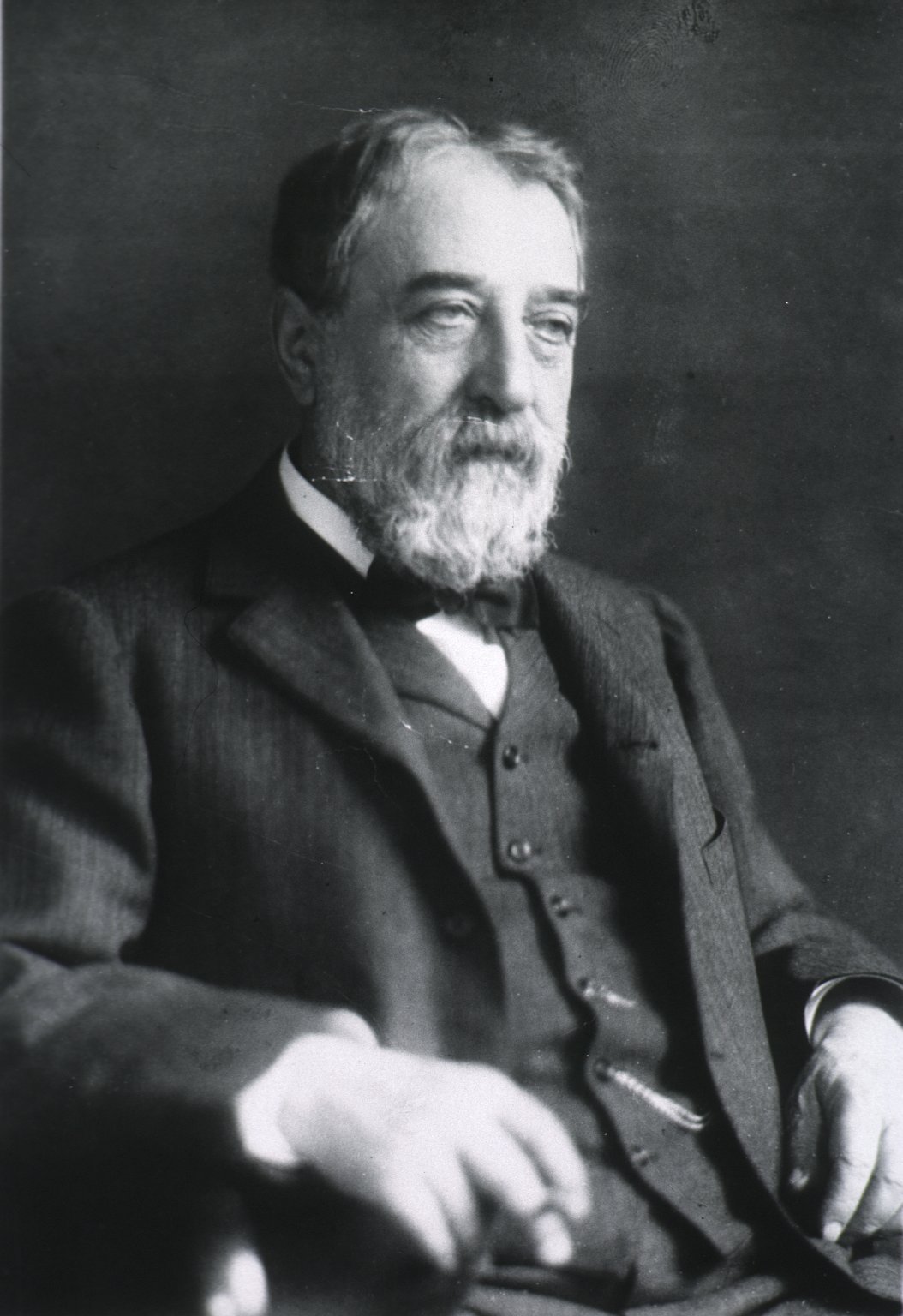
Dr Henry Koplik

Henry Koplik (October 28, 1858, in New York City – April 30, 1927, in New York City) was an American physician. He was educated at the College of the City of New York and at the College of Physicians and Surgeons, and earned his medical degree in 1881. He took a postgraduate course at the universities of Leipzig, Prague, and Vienna, and upon his return to America, established himself as a physician in New York in 1883. There, he became connected with Bellevue Hospital, the Good Samaritan Dispensary, and other medical institutions. In 1899, he was appointed as an assistant professor of pediatrics at Bellevue Medical College.

In 1896, Koplik was the first to describe an important and early diagnostic sign of measles, now known as "Koplik's spots". The spots, which are considered pathognomonic for measles, occur in the mouth a few days before the skin rash appears, and before infectivity reaches its maximum. This allows individuals incubating the disease to be isolated and helps to control epidemics. He should also be remembered as the founder in America of free distribution of safe (i.e. sterilized, not pasteurized) baby milk, in which he was followed later by Nathan Straus. He found, too, the bacillus of whooping-cough.

Besides essays in the medical journals, Koplik published his "Diseases of Infancy and Childhood" in 1902.

Koplik died on April 30, 1927, of heart disease in New York City.
