= Asymmetric periflexural exanthem of childhood =

- Other names: Unilateral laterothoracic exanthem
- Specialty: Dermatology

Asymmetric periflexural exanthem of childhood (APEC), also known as unilateral laterothoracic exanthem, is a rare, self-limited and spontaneously resolving skin rash of the exanthem type with unknown cause that occurs in children. It occurs primarily in the late winter and early spring, most common in Europe, and affecting girls more often than boys. It is probably viral, but no virus has yet been associated with the condition.

== See also ==
- Skin lesion
- List of cutaneous conditions
