= Malakoplakia =

- Other names: Malacoplakia
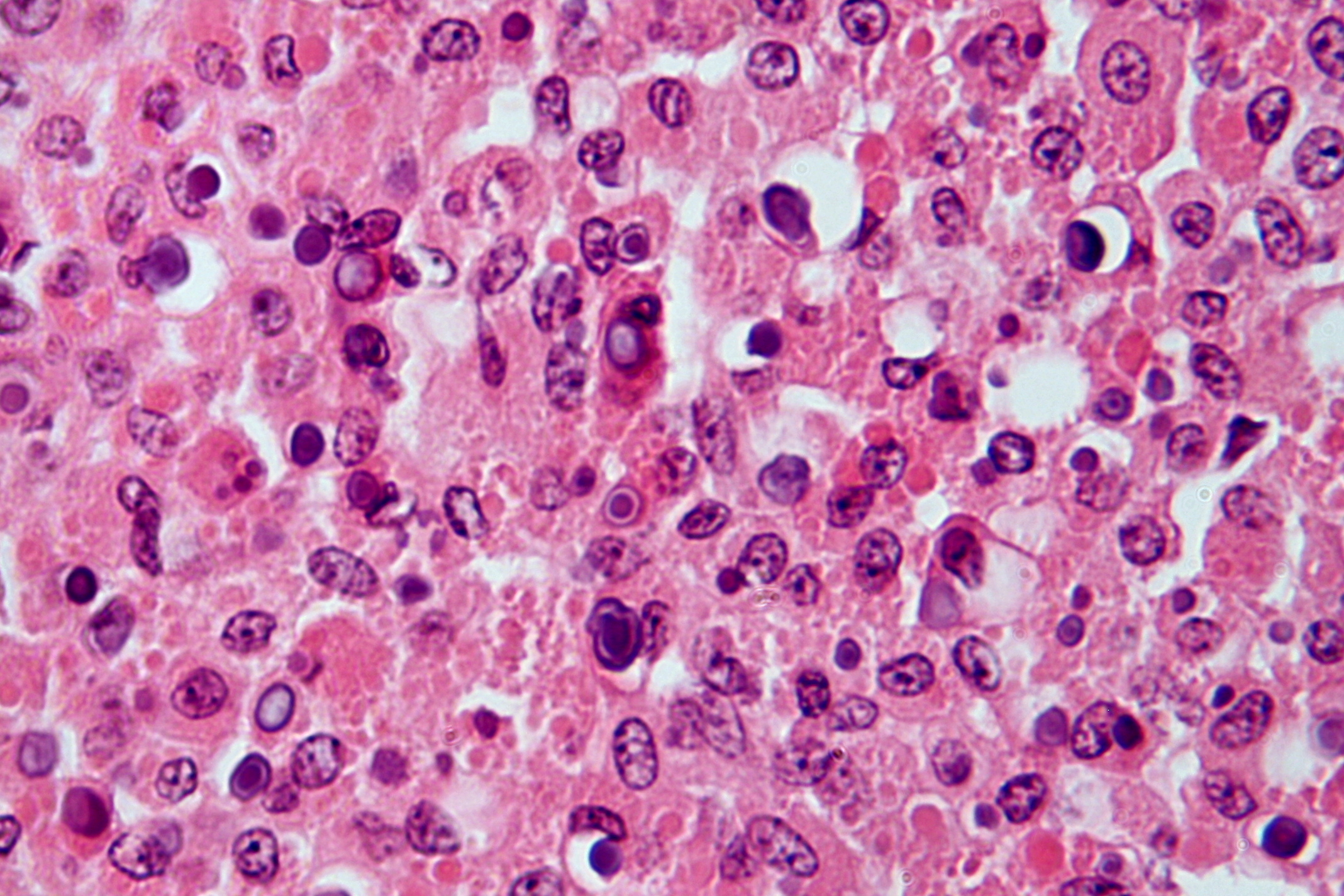
- Micrograph showing the characteristic finding of malakoplakia (Michaelis–Gutmann bodies). H&E stain.

Malakoplakia is a rare inflammatory condition which makes its presence known as a papule, plaque or ulceration that usually affects the genitourinary tract. However, it may also be associated with other bodily organs. It was initially described in the early 20th century as soft yellowish plaques found on the mucosa of the urinary bladder. Microscopically it is characterized by the presence of foamy histiocytes (called von Hansemann cells) with basophilic inclusions called Michaelis–Gutmann bodies.

It usually involves gram-negative bacteria.

== Causes ==
Malakoplakia is thought to result from the insufficient killing of bacteria by macrophages. Therefore, the partially digested bacteria accumulate in macrophages leading to deposition of iron and calcium. The impairment of bactericidal activity manifests itself as the formation of an ulcer, plaque or papule. Malakoplakia is associated with patients with a history of immunosuppression due to lymphoma, diabetes mellitus, kidney transplantation, or because of long-term therapy with systemic corticosteroids.

== Diagnosis ==
As malakoplakia is a condition associated with chronic cystitis, it usually presents itself as a cystitis condition. The following investigations may help in making the diagnosis of malakoplakia:

- Urinalysis which indicates presence of bacteria and white blood cells.
- Urine culture
- Cystoscopic evaluation confirms presence of ulcer or papule.
- Biopsy to rule out other causes.
- The presence of large multinucleated malakoplakia giant cells with concretions called as Michaelis Gutman bodies on microscopy.

== Treatment ==
Treatments for malakoplakia include catheterizing the affected person with full aseptic precautions. Additionally, irrigating the bladder with distilled water three times daily with 3 way Foley's catheter and urinary antiseptics like pyridium may be used to help relieve urinary symptoms. Antibiotics such as trimethoprim-sulfamethoxazole or ciprofloxacin may be used.

== History ==
Leonor Michaelis and Carl Gutmann first described malakoplakia in 1902 after analyzing a patient's tumor at the request of David Paul von Hansemann.

== See also ==
- List of inclusion bodies that aid in diagnosis of cutaneous conditions
