= Enanthem =

Rash on the mucous membranes

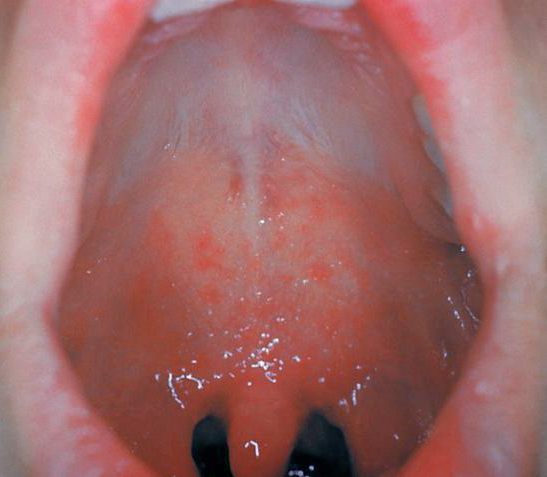
- Rubella (German measles) enanthema
- Specialty: Infectious diseases, dermatology
- Differential diagnosis: smallpox

Enanthem or enanthema is a rash (small spots) on the mucous membranes. It is characteristic of patients with viral infections causing hand foot and mouth disease, measles, and sometimes chicken pox, or COVID-19. In addition, bacterial infections such as scarlet fever may also be a cause of enanthema. The aforementioned diseases usually present with exanthema and enanthema.

Enanthema can also indicate hypersensitivity.

== See also ==
- Koplik's spots
- Strawberry tongue
- Forchheimer spots
