= Koplik's spots =

Rash that is an early sign of measles

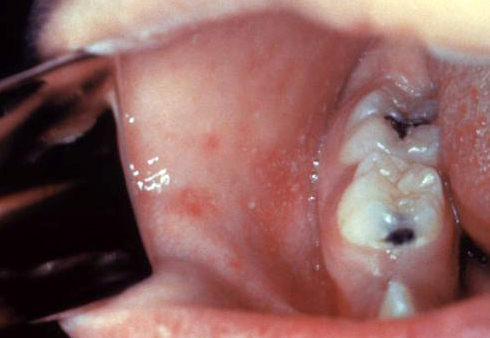
Koplik's spots in the mouth of a child with measles, appearing as "grains of salt on a reddish background."

Koplik's spots (also Koplik's sign) are a prodromic viral enanthem of measles manifesting two to three days before the measles rash itself. They are characterized as clustered, white lesions on the buccal mucosa (opposite the upper 1st & 2nd molars) and are pathognomonic for measles. The textbook description of Koplik spots is ulcerated mucosal lesions marked by necrosis, neutrophilic exudate, and neovascularization. They are described as appearing like "grains of salt on a reddish background", and often fade as the maculopapular rash develops. As well as their diagnostic significance, they are important in the control of outbreaks. Their appearance, in context of a diagnosed case, before they reach maximum infectivity, permits isolation of the contacts and greatly aids control of this highly infectious disease.

Nobel laureate John F. Enders and Thomas Peebles, who first isolated the measles virus, were careful to collect their samples from patients showing Koplik's spots.

== History ==
Koplik's spots are named after Henry Koplik (1858–1927), an American pediatrician who published a short description of them in 1896, emphasising their appearance before the skin rash and their value in the differential diagnosis of diseases with which measles might be mistaken. He published two further papers on the spots, including one with a colour illustration. An anonymous reviewer of Koplik's The Diseases of Infancy and Childhood refers to the illustration as "the now famous coloured plate".

Some authors ascribe the first written description of these spots to Reubold, Würzburg 1854, and others to Johann Andreas Murray (1740–1791). Before Koplik, the German internist Carl Jakob Adolf Christian Gerhardt (1833–1902) in 1874, the Danish physician N. Flindt in 1879, and the Russian Nil Filatov (1847–1902) in 1895, had observed equivalent phenomena. Koplik was aware of Filatov's work, thought his evidence insufficient and rejected his claim for priority.
