= Forchheimer spots =

Symptom of rubella

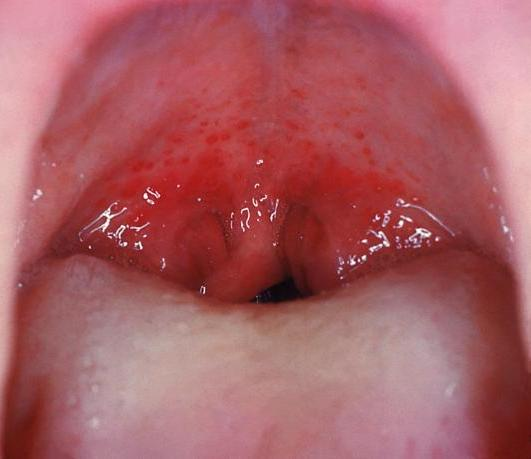
- Small red spots on the soft palate in Strep throat

Forchheimer spots are a type of enanthem seen as tiny red spots on the soft palate in rubella, measles and scarlet fever. They sometimes precede the skin rash of rubella.

The spots may be present in around 20% of people with rubella. The sign is named after Frederick Forchheimer.
