= Nil Filatov =

Russian medical doctor

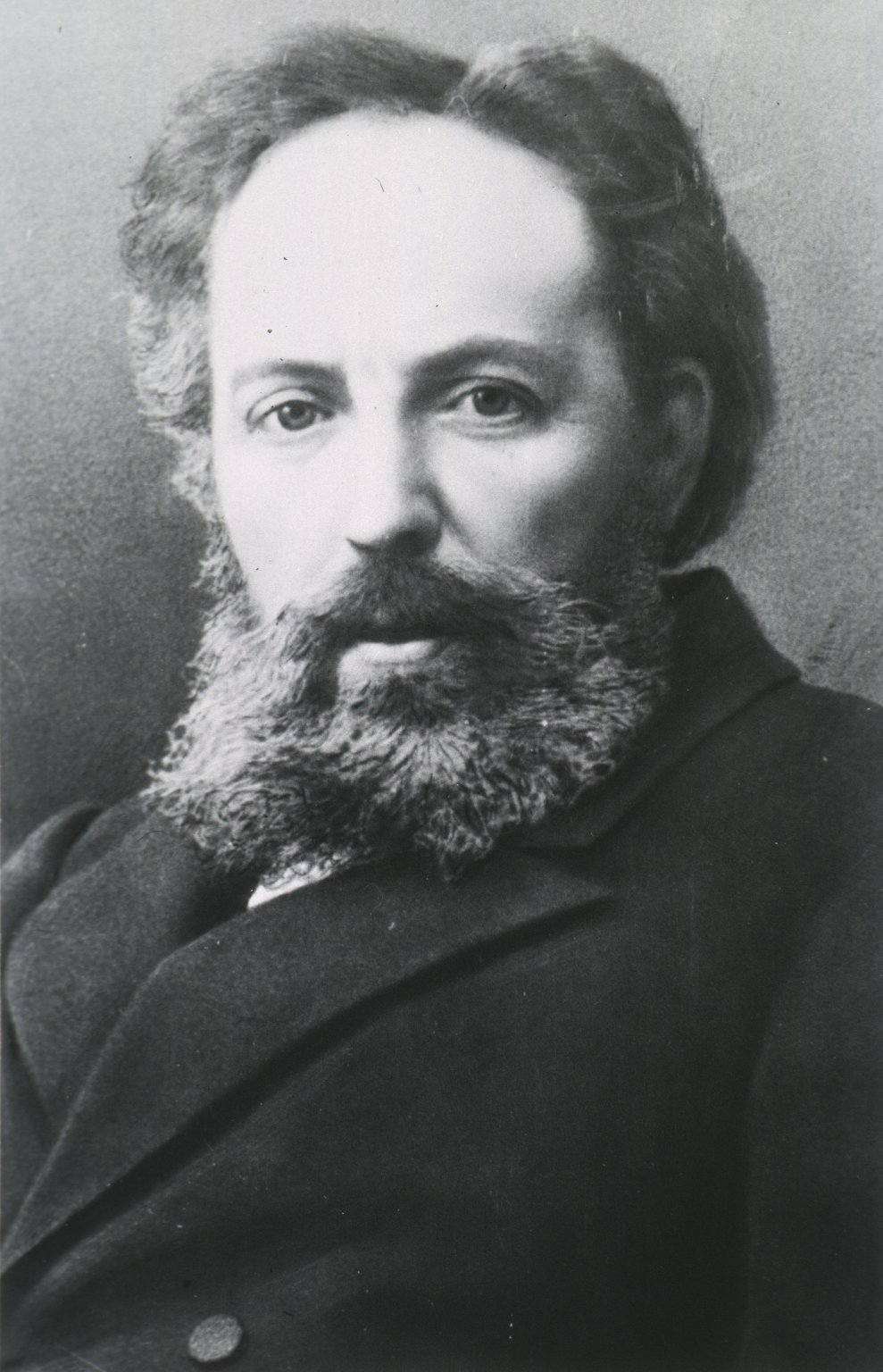
- Born: June 2, 1847; Mikhaylovka, Penza Governorate, now Lyambirsky District, Mordovia, Russia
- Died: February 8, 1902 (aged 54); Moscow
- Citizenship: Russian Empire
- Education: Moscow University
- Known for: Infectious mononucleosis Dukes' disease Koplik spots
- Scientific career
- Fields: paediatrics

Nil Fyodorovich Filatov (Russian: Нил Фёдорович Фила́тов, 2 June [O.S. 21 May] 1847, or 16 April [O.S. 4 April] 1847, – 8 February [O.S. 26 January] 1902) was a medical doctor who is considered the founder of Russian paediatrics.

== Career ==
Having graduated from the Moscow University, he practised as a country doctor in his native region. In 1872–1874, Filatov took additional training in Vienna, Berlin, Heidelberg, and Prague. In 1876, he upheld a thesis on bronchitis and pneumonia, and obtained a doctor degree.

Nil Filatov is most famous for describing infectious mononucleosis (also known as Filatov's disease) in 1887 and Dukes' disease (sometimes referred as Dukes-Filatov disease) in 1885; he was also one of the first to observe Koplik's spots (1895). In cooperation with Georgy Gabrichevsky he introduced serumal treatment of diphtheria in 1894.

He created a number of handbooks on paediatrics, which were not only popular in Russia, but also translated into German, French, Italian, Czech and Hungarian. In 1892, Filatov established the Society of Paediatricians in Moscow.

The oldest children's hospitals in Moscow (where Filatov worked, now #13), and in Russia (#5, based in St. Petersburg) are named after him. His nephew Vladimir Filatov was a prominent ophthalmologist.
