= List of inclusion bodies that aid in diagnosis of cutaneous conditions =

Many skin conditions require a skin biopsy for confirmation of the diagnosis. With several of these conditions there are features within the cells contained in the skin biopsy specimen that have elements in their cytoplasm or nucleus that have a characteristic appearance unique to the condition. These elements are termed inclusion bodies.

Inclusion bodies that when present aid in the diagnosis of conditions of or affecting the human integumentary system
Name	Composition	Location	Condition(s)
Asteroid			Sporotrichosis
Cowdry A			Herpes simplex
Cowdry B			Polio virus
Donovan			Granuloma inguinale
Dutcher		Intranuclear	Primary cutaneous marginal zone lymphoma Multiple myeloma
Hansemann cells			Malakoplakia
Pustulo-ovoid		Cytoplasm	Granular cell tumor
Medlar			Chromoblastomycosis
Michaelis–Gutmann	Calcium		Malakoplakia
Mikulicz's cells			Rhinoscleroma
Psammoma	Calcium		
Rocha Lima			Verruga peruana
Russell		Cytoplasm	Multiple myeloma Rhinoscleroma
Schaumann	Calcium		Sarcoidosis
Verocay			Schwannoma
Virchow			Leprosy

== See also ==
- List of contact allergens
- List of cutaneous conditions
- List of genes mutated in cutaneous conditions
- List of target antigens in pemphigus
- List of specialized glands within the human integumentary system
