= Erythema multiforme minor =

Mild rash of the skin or mucous membranes

- Other names: EM
- Specialty: Dermatology

Erythema multiforme (EM) is usually a reaction of the skin and mucous membranes that occurs suddenly. It appears as a symmetrical rash and may include the mucous membrane lesions. This means that the body is sensitive to something that causes the skin and mucous membranes to react.

The more common mild form is refer to as EM minor. It consists of a skin rash that involve no more than one mucosal surface. The sudden onset will progress rapidly as symmetrical lesions with circular color changes in some or all of the lesions. Rash will spread towards center or trunk of the body. Evenly distributed bumps on the skin become classic iris or target lesions. They have bright red borders and small white bumps in the center.

Erythema multiforme minor is sometimes divided into papular and vesiculobullous forms.

== Causes ==
The cause of EM appears to be a highly sensitive reaction that can be triggered by a variety of causes. The causes can include bacterial, viral or chemical products, such as antibiotics – specifically penicillins or cephalosporins. This reaction is an allergic reaction and is in no way contagious.

== See also ==
- Erythema
- Diascopy
- Erythema multiforme
- List of cutaneous conditions
