= David Paul von Hansemann =

German pathologist (1858–1920)

David Paul von Hansemann (5 September 1858 – 1920) was a German pathologist born in Eupen, east Belgium. He is remembered for his work in the field of oncology, in particular, his concept pertaining to anaplasia of cancer cells.

He studied medicine at the Universities of Berlin, Kiel and Leipzig, and following graduation spent nine years as an assistant to Rudolf Virchow (1821-1902) in Berlin. In 1890 he became habilitated in pathological anatomy, and in 1897 obtained the title of professor. In 1907 he began work as a prosector at Friedrichshain city hospital. During World War I he served as an army pathologist.

His name is associated with "Hansemann macrophages" (also known as "Hansemann cells"), which are large mononuclear cells containing Michaelis-Gutmann bodies that affect the urinary tract or kidney.

== Associated works ==
- Über asymmetrische Zelltheilung in Epithelkrebsen und deren biologische Bedeutung. Virchow's Archiv für pathologische Anatomie und Physiologie und für klinische Medicin, 1890, 779: 299–326. (About asymmetrical cell division in epithelial cancers and their biological significance, Anaplasia first described).
- Die mikroskopische Diagnose der bösartigen Geschwülste. Berlin, 1897; 2nd edition, 1902.
- Books on David Paul von Hansemann:
- "David Paul von Hansemann: Contributions to Oncology (Context, Comments and Translations)", by Leon P. Bignold, Brian L.D. Coghlan, Hubertus P.A. Jersmann (2007); ISBN 978-3-7643-7768-7
