= Southern tick-associated rash illness =

- Other names: Masters' disease, Southern Lyme Disease
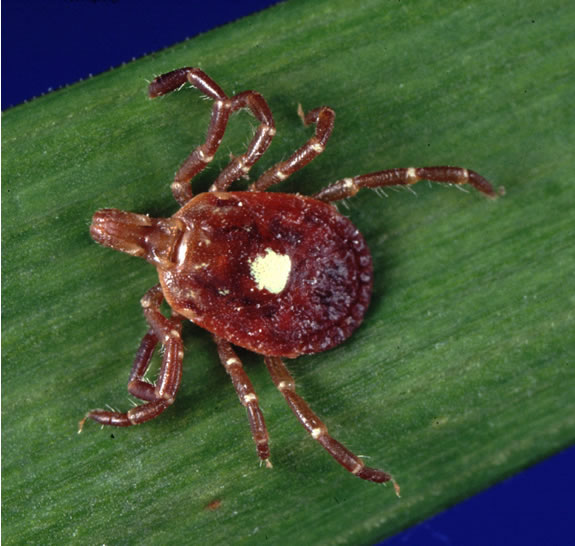
- Lone star ticks can be carriers of southern tick-associated rash illness.
- Specialty: Infectious disease
- Named after: Dr. Edwin Masters

Southern tick-associated rash illness (STARI) is a tick-borne disease resembling a mild form of Lyme disease, which occurs in southeastern and south-central United States. It is spread by bites from the lone star tick Amblyomma americanum. The actual cause is still unknown.

== Signs and symptoms ==
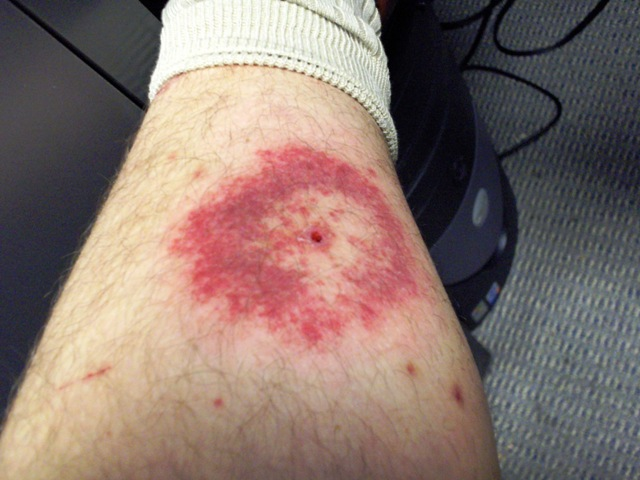
"Bull's-eye" STARI rash

Diagnosis is based on a circular "bull's-eye" rash at the site of infection called erythema chronicum migrans, which is very similar to that seen in Lyme disease. However, the symptoms of STARI are mild and resemble influenza, with fatigue, muscle pains, and headache. Fever is sometimes seen, but is not characteristic.

Asymptomatic patients with erythema chronicum migrans have been medically diagnosed with STARI. STARI is not defined by its symptoms, and has had a symptom-free presence on some rash victims.

== Geography ==
As of 2018, most cases were from Southeastern Missouri, a few were from South Carolina, North Carolina, Georgia, and one case each in Mississippi and Long Island, New York.

So far, Lonestar ticks, or Amblyomma americanum, have been reported in the following US state: Alabama, Arkansas, Connecticut, Delaware, Florida, Georgia, Illinois, Indiana, Iowa, Kansas, Kentucky, Louisiana, Maine, Maryland, Massachusetts, Mississippi, Missouri, Nebraska, New Hampshire, New Jersey, New York, North Carolina, Ohio, Oklahoma, Pennsylvania, Rhode Island, South Carolina, Tennessee, Texas, Vermont, Virginia, and West Virginia.

Since STARI and Lyme disease commonly get confused, it is relevant to note that Lyme can also be received from deer ticks and Xodes Scapularis, which also inhabit parts of where the Lonestar tick can be found.

As climate change continues, the spread of both Lonestar and deer ticks is likely to countinue.

== Cause ==
The illness, first described in 1997, is a tick-borne disease carried by the lone star tick Amblyomma americanum. The tick had first been proposed as a possible vector of disease in 1984, and the illnesses associated with the tick was called "Lyme-like disease", but it was not recognized to be distinct from Lyme disease until the late 1990s.

In 2004, the disease was suggested to be caused by the related bacterium Borrelia lonestari, which is a spirochete first isolated in culture in 2004. However, the conclusion has been controversial since the spirochete has not been detected in many cases of the syndrome, which has led some authors to argue that the illness is not caused by a bacterial pathogen. Several studies have failed to detect Borrelia burgdorferi, which is the causative agent of Lyme disease, in patients from the southern United States.

It has been suggested that tick salivary toxins may play a role, as the toxins are similar to spiders, scorpions, and homologous to those found in snakes.

== Treatment ==
Infections are treated with antibiotics, particularly doxycycline, and the acute symptoms appear to respond to these drugs.

Amoxicillin has also been used to treat STARI patients. Determining what treats STARI best is difficult because symptoms and the rash tend to improve over time. In one particular case, involving a two year old girl, the rash continued to enlarge even after 6 days taking Amoxicillin. Opposingly, a different case involving an eight year old girl, saw improvement in symptoms and the rash within a week of taking the medicine.

== Diagnosis ==
Distinguishing STARI from Lyme disease is complex. However, scientists have found metabolic differences that could help create a metabolic signature for diagnosis.

A strategy used before diagnostic tests become available was to identify the ticks that were removed from the body. Female lonestar ticks often have a small white spot on their back, while female deer ticks have black legs and a large black spot. Furthermore, lonestar ticks have festoons on their posterior abdomen while deer ticks do not. Deer ticks have an anterior anal groove while lonestar ticks have a posterior one. If rash or illness occurs, knowing what tick infected the patient allows doctors to more accurately diagnose the disease.

== Prognosis ==
No serious long-term effects are known for this disease, but preliminary evidence suggests, if such symptoms do occur they are less severe than those associated with Lyme disease.

== See also ==
- Borrelia
- Zoonosis
