= Erythema migrans =

Rash in several vector-borne diseases

Erythema migrans or erythema chronicum migrans is an expanding rash often seen in the early stage of Lyme disease, and can also (but less commonly) be caused by southern tick-associated rash illness (STARI). It can appear anywhere from one day to one month after a tick bite. This rash does not represent an allergic reaction to the bite, but rather an actual skin infection. The rash's name comes from Neo-Latin for "migrating redness."

In Europe, 80% of Lyme rashes look like a "bull's eye," but in only 20% of cases in the United States. (20 percent of Lyme infections show no rash.)

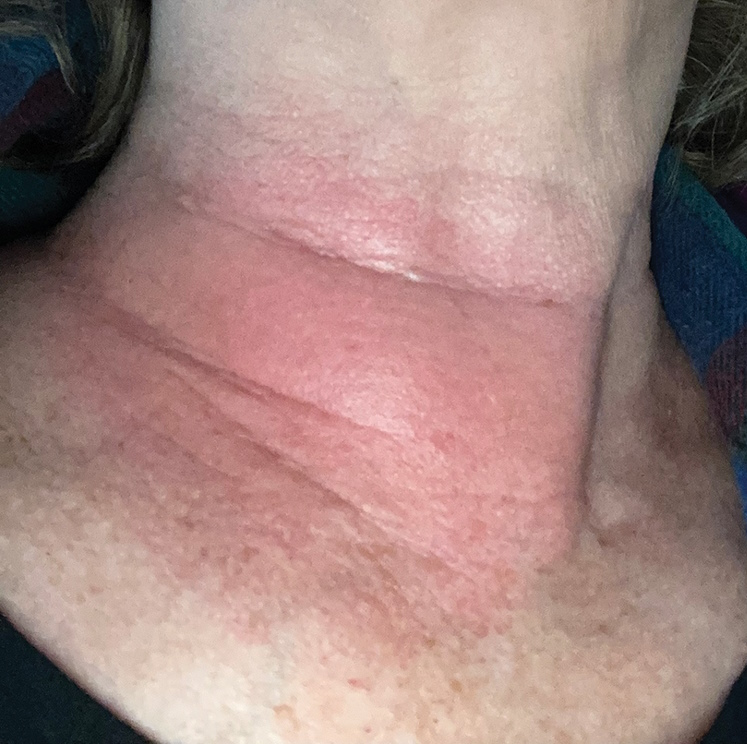
Erythema migrans ("migrating redness") and may have no definite pattern, as in this Lyme rash on a woman's neck. Rashes from non-Lyme causes may look similar.

== Lyme disease ==
"Erythema migrans is the only manifestation of Lyme disease in the United States that is sufficiently distinctive to allow clinical diagnosis in the absence of laboratory confirmation." Often, but not always, mentions of a target lesion (bull's-eye lesion) are talking about erythema migrans. However, the appearance of erythema migrans can vary considerably: while some look like a bull's eye, in the U.S. most are evenly red or bluish, without a central or ring-like clearing. A minority of patients never have any rash. Because Lyme disease can within a few weeks cause long-term neurologic complications, persons with a rash and recent history of outdoor activities where Lyme is common should seek a doctor for diagnosis.

=== Presentation ===
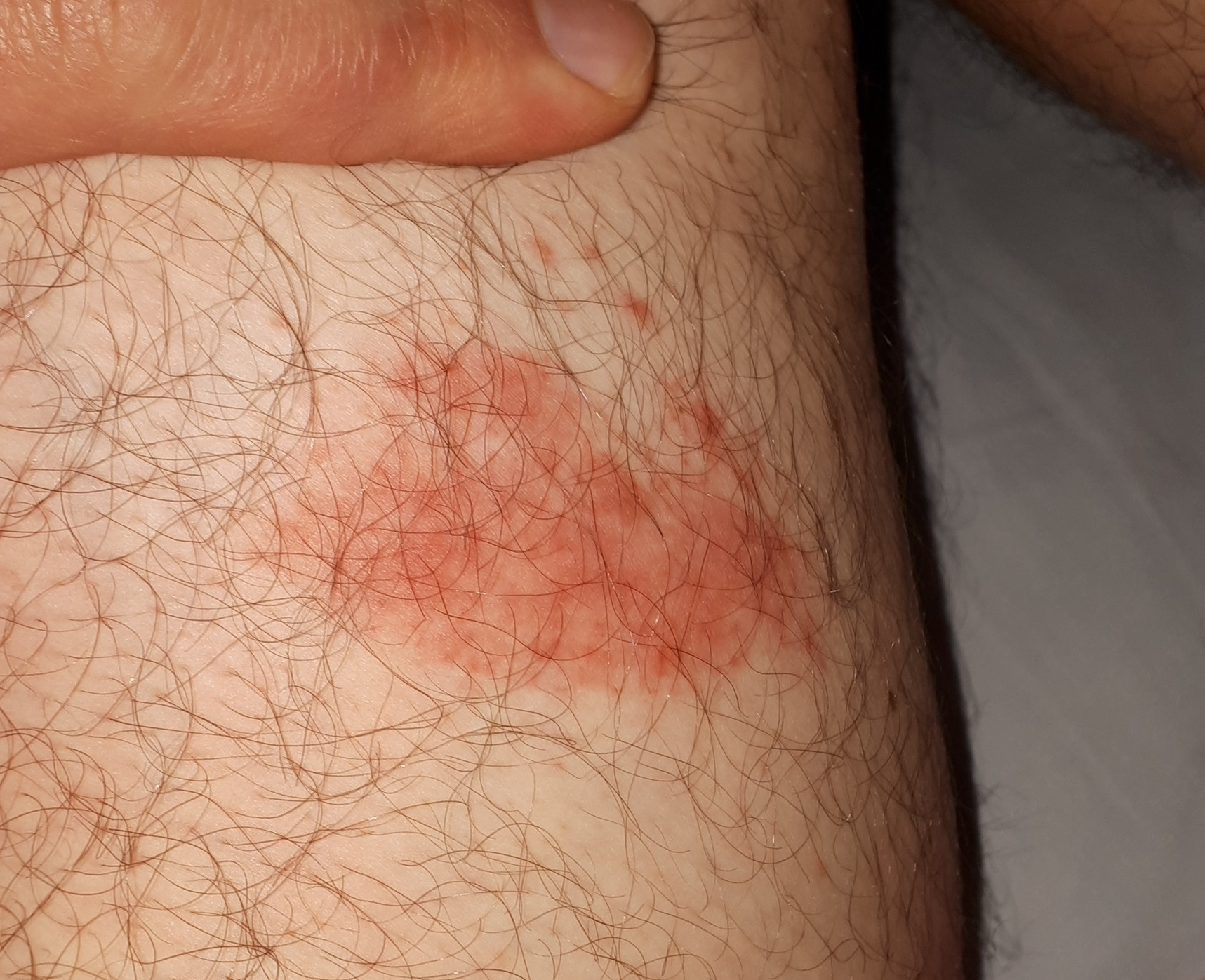
This rash did not at first look at all like a bull's eye.

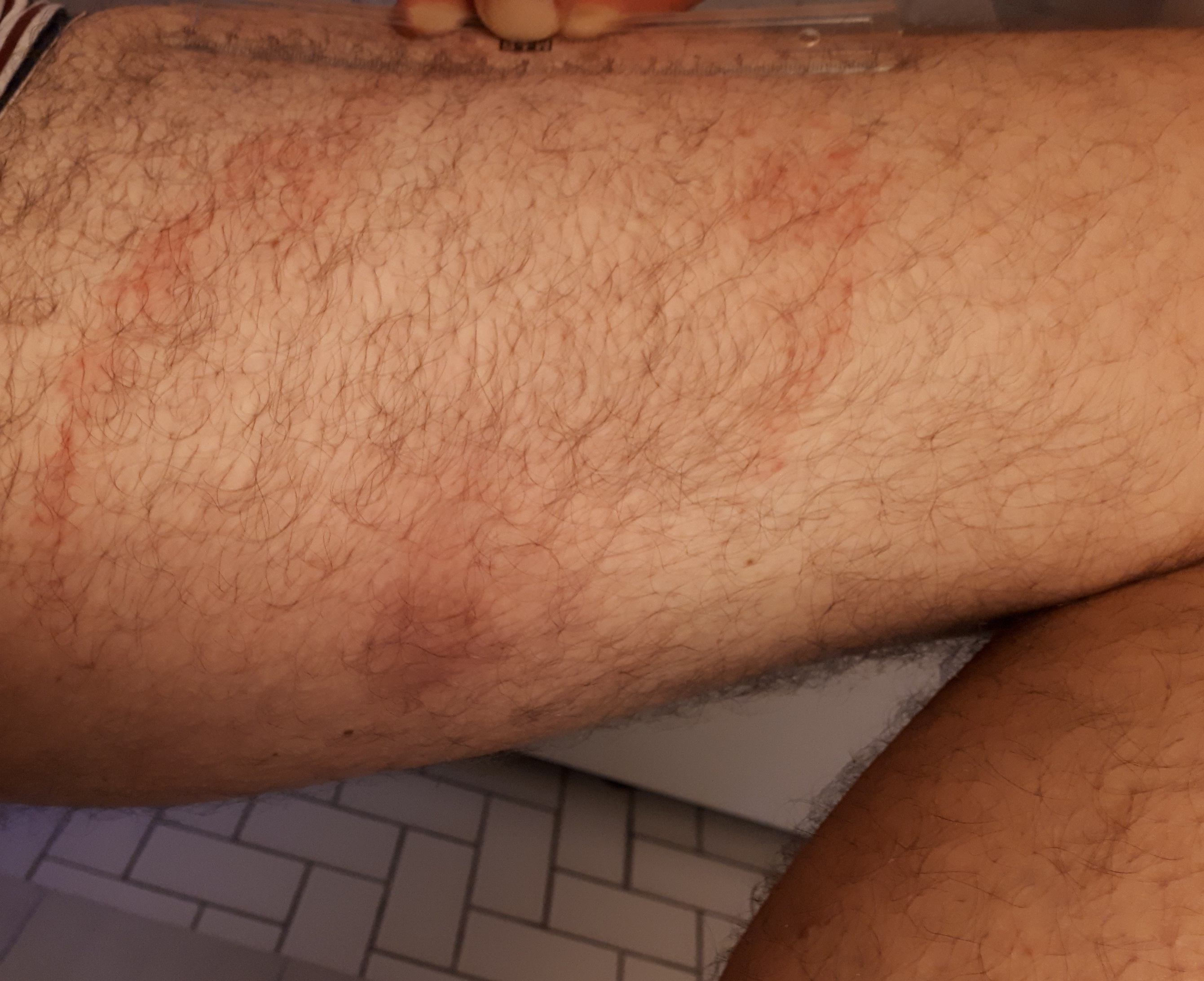
After 8 weeks, the rash cleared from the center toward the edges and looked a bit more like a bull's eye.

The initial sign of about 80% of Lyme infections is an erythema migrans (EM) rash at the site of a tick bite, often near skin folds, such as the armpit, groin, or back of knee, on the trunk, under clothing straps, or in children's hair, ear, or neck. Most people who get infected do not remember seeing a tick or the bite. The EM rash appears typically one or two weeks (range 3–32 days) after the bite. The most distinctive features of the EM rash are the speed and extent to which it expands, respectively 2–3 cm per day and up to a diameter of 5–70 cm (50% attain more than 16 cm). The rash is usually circular or oval, red or bluish, and may have an elevated or darker center. In about 79% of cases in Europe but only 19% of cases in endemic areas of the U.S., the rash gradually clears from the center toward the edges, possibly forming a "bull's eye" pattern. The rash may feel warm but usually is not itchy, is rarely tender or painful, and takes up to four weeks to resolve if untreated.

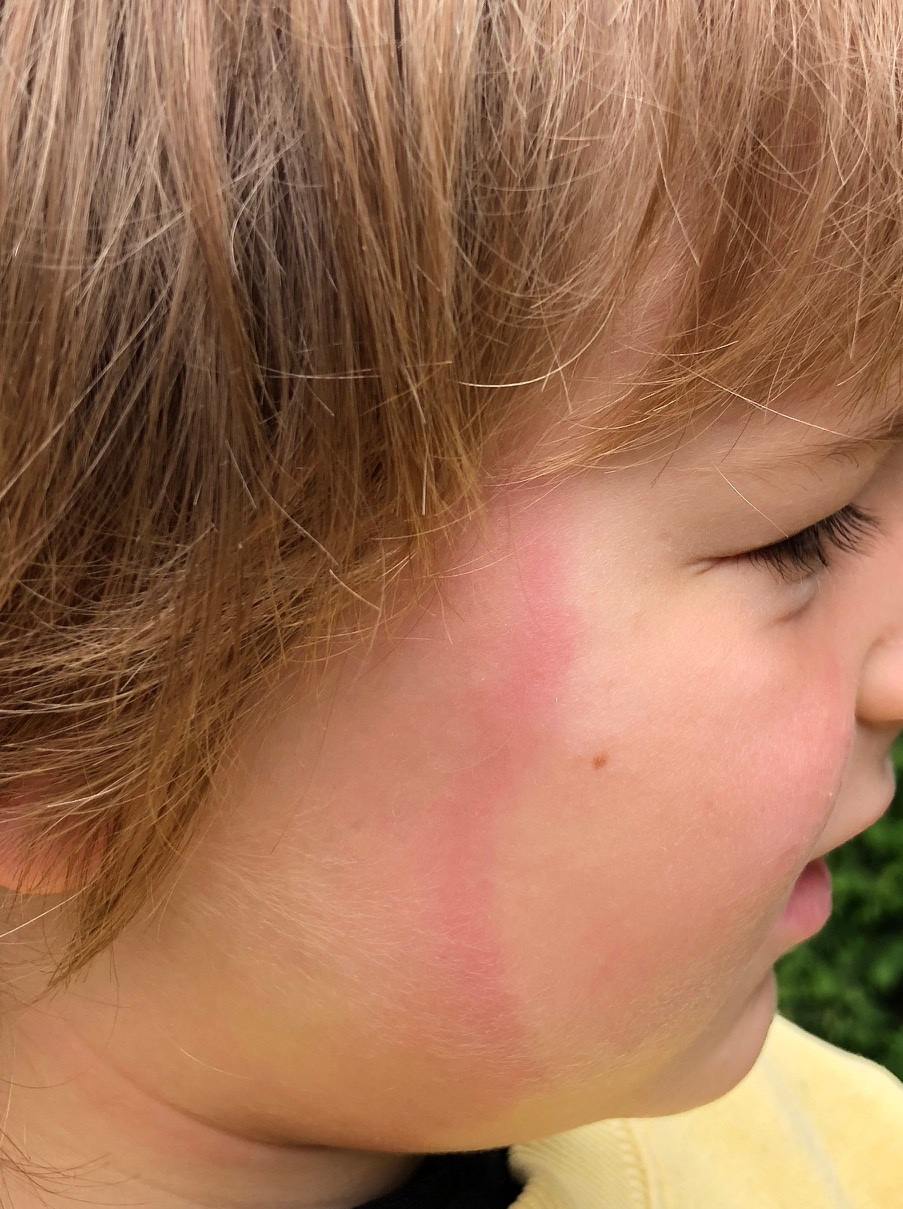
Visible part of the Lyme disease rash showing its characteristic asymmetrical cross-section

The EM rash is often accompanied by symptoms of a viral-like illness, including fatigue, headache, body aches, fever, and chills, but usually not nausea or upper-respiratory problems. These symptoms may also appear without a rash, or linger after the rash disappears. Lyme can progress to later stages without these symptoms or a rash.

A person with an asymptomatic EM rash can easily miss its significance. However, if the initial EM rash is not treated, the infection can disseminate through the lymphatic system or blood. Within days or weeks, additional EM rashes, usually smaller, can appear at other sites, or the infection can cause more serious complications in the nervous system, heart, or joints.

== Southern tick-associated rash illness ==
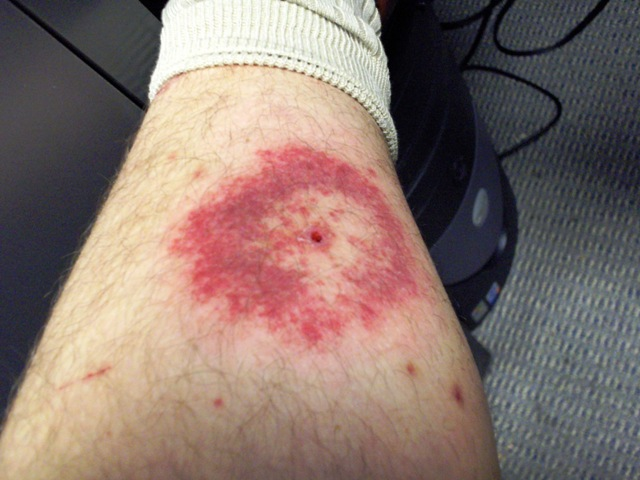
Erythema migrans by STARI.

Southern tick-associated rash illness (STARI) produces a similar rash pattern although it develops more quickly and is smaller. This erythema is also sometimes called erythema migrans or EM. The associated infectious agent has not been determined. Antibiotic treatment resolves the illness quickly.

== Treatment ==
Both Lyme disease and STARI can be treated with antibiotics, particularly doxycycline, or amoxicillin in children less than 8 years of age.

== History ==
In a 1909 meeting of the Swedish Society of Dermatology, Arvid Afzelius first presented research about an expanding, ring-like lesion he had observed. Afzelius published his work 12 years later and speculated the rash came from the bite of an Ixodes tick, meningitic symptoms and signs in a number of cases and that both sexes were affected. This rash was known as erythema chronicum migrans, the skin rash found in early-stage Lyme disease.

In the 1920s, French physicians Garin and Bujadoux described a patient with meningoencephalitis, painful sensory radiculitis, and erythema migrans following a tick bite, and they postulated the symptoms were due to a spirochetal infection. In the 1940s, German neurologist Alfred Bannwarth described several cases of chronic lymphocytic meningitis and polyradiculoneuritis, some of which were accompanied by erythematous skin lesions.
