= Frederick Forchheimer =

American pediatrician

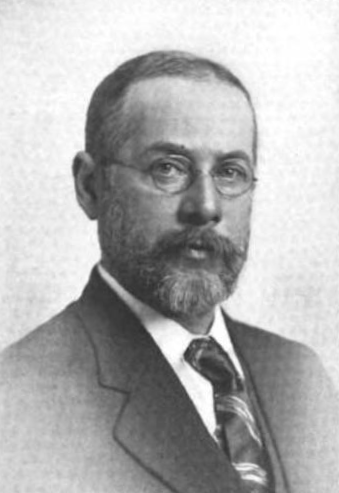
- Born: September 25, 1853; Cincinnati, Ohio
- Died: June 1, 1913 (aged 59); Cincinnati, Ohio
- Resting place: Spring Grove Cemetery
- Education: Medical College of Ohio; College of Physicians and Surgeons
- Occupation: Pediatrician
- Children: Edith Perry (m. 1885)

Frederick Forchheimer (1853–1913) was an American pediatrician known for describing Forchheimer spots.

== Biography ==
Frederick Forchheimer was born in Cincinnati on September 25, 1853. He was educated in public schools and the Medical College of Ohio. He graduated from the College of Physicians and Surgeons in New York in 1873.

He became an instructor at the Medical College of Ohio in 1875, and founded one of the first clinics for children in the United States. He became professor of diseases of children, and published Diseases of the Mouth in Children in 1892 in which he described his eponymous sign.

He married Edith Perry in 1885 and they had three children.

He became president of the Association of American Physicians in 1911 and was given an honorary Doctor of Science degree by Harvard University. He was professor of medicine at the University of Cincinnati at the time of his death, which occurred at Jewish Hospital on June 1, 1913, after a prostate operation. He was buried at Spring Grove Cemetery.

Forchheimer spots are named for him.
