= Dukes' disease =

Medical condition

Dukes' disease, named after Clement Dukes (1845–1925), also known as fourth disease, Filatov-Dukes' disease (after Nil Filatov), Staphylococcal Scalded Skin Syndrome (SSSS), or Ritter's disease is an exanthem (rash-causing) illness primarily affecting children and historically described as a distinct bacterial infection, though its existence as a separate disease entity is now debated.

It is distinguished from measles or forms of rubella, though it was considered as a form of bacterial rash. Although Dukes identified it as a separate entity, it is thought not to be different from scarlet fever caused by exotoxin-producing Streptococcus pyogenes after Keith Powell proposed equating it with the condition currently known as staphylococcal scalded skin syndrome in 1979.

It was never associated with a specific pathogen, and the terminology is no longer in use. However, a mysterious rash of unknown cause in school children often gives rise to the question of whether it could be Dukes' disease.

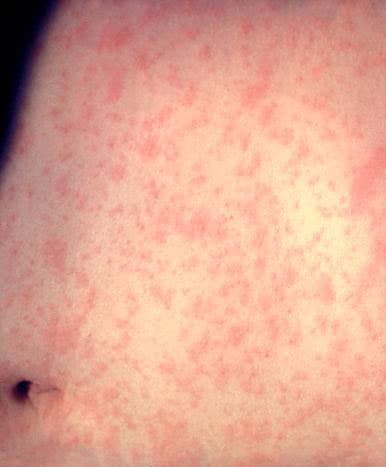
A photo provided by the CDC that depicts the rash that children get while infected. The rash is distinct as it shows multiple splotches of inflamed areas on the body and is irregular in its colonies. Duke's disease may have a similar appearance as the rash as it has the same mechanism of bacterial infection that causes the rash.

== Signs and symptoms ==
Dukes' disease is one of the major skin infections. This infection has large parts of body skins peeled off, and it looks like burned skin by hot liquid. The disease is the time between exposure to the bacteria and the onset of symptoms. This can be different person to person and typically days to a week.

This disease mostly occurs in newborn babies, and they have blistering on the superficial surface of the skin. It is caused by the exfoliative toxins from Staphylococcus aureus.

In general, the starting signs and symptoms of Dukes' disease are fever and redness on the skin surface. Within 24– 48 hours, blisters having fluid are formed on the entire body. The blisters and ruptured features look like a burn. The large skin surface is peeled off, and it looks like the symptoms of exfoliation or desquamation.

Initial symptoms: fever, malaise/ discomfort, headache, and sore throat may also be present.

Symptoms of Dukes diseases:

- Skin surface exfoliation followed by acute erythematous cellulitis
- Intensity of diseases varies depending on:
  - A few watery blisters on some parts of the skin
  - Severe exfoliation of the entire body surface
- Red blisters on skin surface: looks like burned or scaled. (It has the name of staphylococcal scalded skin syndrome.) The rash may last for several days and then fade.

=== Categories of skin rashes ===
In 1900, Clement Dukes categorized these rashes and divided them based on clinical presentation into: measles (first), scarlet fever (second), rubella (third), and Dukes (fourth). In 1905, Léon Cheinisse categorized erythema infectiosum (fifth). John Zahorsky added roseola infantum (sixth) in 1910.

=== Comparison with scarlet fever ===
One of the similar features between the scarlet fever and the Dukes' disease is the rash. However, in the presentation of the Scarlet Fever, it notably manifests as pharyngitis, rash, Filatov mask, Pastia sign, and strawberry tongue. Though the diagnosis for Dukes' disease is unclear, it may be similar to that of scarlet fever, which includes throat and tonsil swab culture or a rapid antigen detection test for group A beta-hemolytic streptococcus (GABHS).

The Dukes' disease is also sometimes compared to the staphylococcal scalded skin syndrome (SSSS), in which symptoms of sunburn-like rashes will appear with the possibility of sprouting blisters. The characteristics of SSSS in Dukes' disease shows up as peeling caused by an infection, and often will look like it has been burned by hot liquid. Contrarily, scarlet fever shows up with extreme similarities in the peeling of the skin, however, with more signs of rough, patchy, sandpaper-like texture that stems from the groin and folds in the arms and the back of the legs.

== Mechanism ==
Dukes disease is believed to be the result of the exotoxins of Staphylococcus aureus (a gram-positive bacteria), which produces 2 types of common exotoxins pyrogenic toxin superantigens (PTSAgs) and hemolysins. These exoproteins are the root cause of the bacteria strains' ability to infect mammalian hosts and cause diseases. The exoproteins work by breaking down the host tissue into nutrients that the bacteria use to grow and spread further. These toxins are known to affect the human immune system cells which can lead to the breaking out in hives. These toxins work to make the immune system weaker so that the S. aureus can function without the immune system's inhibition.

One of the main ways the bacteria can infect the host is by the consumption of contaminated food. The other way S. aureus can infect people is by skin lesions. These skin lesions can be classified into 2 classes, a spontaneous (primary) infection or a consequence of a lesion that was already present. The primary infection is defined as an infection that occurs with no indication of a pre-existing wound, such as impetigo (also known as school sores), which is a skin condition that occurs via red sores on the face. The secondary infection would occur if there is already a wound present and later becomes infected, such as cellulitis (a severe skin infection that causes swelling and redness) occurring from a cut. Once the bacteria is in the host, this is where the exotoxins are released and this causes the common factor of inflammation in all of the potential skin conditions that can be caused by S. aureus. For instance, toxic shock syndrome (TSS) is linked to the properties of the superantigens that S. aureus toxins produce which causes the cytokines to spike in production. The cytokines are increased due to the superantigens triggering a greater production of the T lymphocytes, which is an inflammatory mediator. Additionally, S. aureus can release pro-coagulant factors like tissue factor (TF) and von Willebrand factor from the triggering of the inflammatory mediators, as well as bind to fibrinogen which helps make blood clots.

Staphylococcus aureus is a very adaptable bacterial strain as it shows to be evolving into more antibiotic-resistant strains over the years, such as MRSA. When S. aureus was first discovered in the 1880s, it had a high mortality rate of 80% until the 1940s, when the discovery of penicillin was used to treat bacterial infection. However, after only 2 years of penicillin being used for treatment, there was already the development of an S. aureus strain that was methicillin-resistant due to the mecA gene, which resulted in MRSA. Typically, in a methicillin-sensitive S. aureus, the β-lactam antibiotics can bind to the PBP on the bacterial cell wall, which destabilizes the production of the peptidoglycan layer of the bacteria. The mecA gene, however, works by preventing the β-lactam antibiotics from binding thus, resulting in the peptidoglycan layer being stable which results in more growth of MRSA. Current antibiotic treatment uses vancomycin as the treatment choice in defending against severe S. aureus infections. However, due to the adaptability of S, aureus, there have been increasing signs of a vancomycin-resistant stain known as vancomycin intermediate-resistant S. aureus (VISA). S. aureus can develop this immunity by having the Mobile genetic elements (MBEs), as this allows the bacteria to be able to transfer genetic information by horizontal gene transfer. This is an issue as, worldwide, VRSA (vancomycin-resistant MRSA) has been steadily increasing over the years as it is now showing a 3.5 times increase between pre-2006 and 2020.

== Diagnosis ==
Currently, there are no guidelines on how to diagnose Dukes' disease due to a lack of research. However, there may be an overlap of rash-like symptoms with more common diseases such as measles and rubella.

Though the epidemiology and roots of infection are unclear, the similar clinical presentations of rash-like symptoms deduce that the Centor score and testing could be utilized, similar to how scarlet fever is diagnosed for group A streptococcus (GAS) presentations. The Centor score is assessed from 0 to 4, where one point is added based on the criteria of a fever ≥ 38 °C, absence of cough, swollen anterior cervical lymph nodes, tonsillar exudate, or swelling. In some cases, temperatures can rise to 39.5 °C - 40 °C that last 3 to 4 days without any systemic symptoms, excluding rare cases that involve convulsions. This criterion helps identify the likelihood of GAS-related cases that may or may not be affiliated with Dukes' disease. However, the diagnosis of scarlet fever and Dukes' disease is fundamentally not well understood. Therefore, the classification and criteria for observing any presentations of rashes should only be used for reference.

To confirm Dukes' disease, a skin biopsy and culture examination may be needed.

- Biopsy of skin samples can be observed with the microscope.
- A culture test is used to check the presence of certain bacteria. A culture test is usually conducted by using a sample of nose, blood, throat, skin, and blood. To diagnose Dukes' disease in neonates, culture of the umbilicus is used.

== Treatment ==
Treatment depends on the child's age, symptoms, the severity of the condition, and overall health.

Treatment of Dukes disease (SSSS) is done in the burn unit of the hospital or in an intensive care unit (ICU) as treatments for SSSS and burns are similar. Dukes disease's treatment focus on providing fluid and electrolytes.

Treatment may include:

- Intravenous (IV) antibiotics including but not limited to clindamycin, trimethoprim-sulfamethoxazole (TMP-SMX), and mupirocin. Fluclozacillin is sometimes used for people having a penicillinase-resistant or anti-staphylococcal antibiotic. Oral antibiotic is also used for a few days to replace IV antibiotics.
- IV fluids to prevent dehydration
- Nasogastric feeding (feeding via a tube from the mouth to the stomach), if needed
- Pain medications
- Use of skin ointments or creams and bandages

In general, Dukes' disease treatment in the hospital takes 6–7 days, but patients are advised to use treatments afterward for up to 15 days.

Paracetamol is used as a first-line medication to treat pain and fever related to Dukes' disease. Also, intravenous immunoglobulin was used to combat Dukes' disease, but recent studies associate it with prolonged hospitalization.

In a systematic review, topical treatments such as mupirocin and fusidic acid were found to be more effective than oral antibiotics. Penicillin was also found to be the least effective in treating lingering symptoms as opposed to alternative antibiotic treatments. There is always the risk of antibiotic resistance, and studies have found that continuous, high levels of fusidic acid ointment led to increased resistance S. aureus particularly in Northern Europe in the early 2000s.

In “On the Confusion of Two Different Diseases Under the Name of Rubella (Rose-Rash),” Dukes describes how fourth disease should be treated. Dukes stated that on the fifth or sixth day of the illness, the patient may be permitted to get up if their strength permits. Afterwards, the patient should spend three or four days indoors followed by five or six days in the fresh air. Within 14 days the patient will usually experience complete recovery and can safely return to school.

== Risk associated with Dukes' disease ==
Newborns and children under 5 years old are at high risk of Dukes' disease. To protect from Dukes' disease, body have lifelong immunity having antibodies against Staphylococcal strain, and this reduces the chance of Dukes' disease in older children and adults.

- Reduced immune system against bacterial exotoxins
- Imperfect renal clearance ( because exotoxins are cleared through kidneys)

Reduced immune systems and imperfect renal clearance increase the chance of Dukes' disease in newborns.

It shows irrespective of age and sex, immunocompromised people and patients having renal failure are at risk of Dukes' disease.

== Complications associated with Dukes' disease ==
The danger of Dukes' disease is that different bacteria may invade the skin and may lead to bloodstream infection. Loss of body fluids is critical to newborns. Continuous loss of fluid leading to dehydration may result in worse condition.

Other complications are poor temperature control in newborns, hair follicle infections, bloodstream infections such as sepsis, dermatitis, and scabies.

- Cellulitis: spreading of infection to a deeper layer of skin. Inflamed and reddish skin with pain. It can be treated with antibiotics and analgesics for the pain.
- Guttate psoriasis: red, small, droplet-shaped, scaly patches happen on the arms, chest, and scalp. Antibacterial creams are used to control symptoms. It becomes better after 6–7 days.
- Sepsis: It may make the person feel cold (chills), shiver (rigors), diarrhea, fever, clammy skin, confusion, hypotension, dizziness, faint feeling, and loss of consciousness.
- Scarring: Scratching at sores and blisters leads to scarring.
- Post-streptococcal glomerulonephritis (PSG)

== History ==
Dukes' disease was first observed between 1884 and 1900 with outbreaks occurring in 1892, 1896, and 1900. The 1892 outbreak consisted of 16 cases of Dukes' disease, and the 1896 outbreak consisted of 31 cases of Dukes' disease. While there were several cases of Dukes' disease previously, the most compelling evidence for Dukes' disease occurred in 1900 with a school outbreak that affected 19 boys. As a chief surgeon at a large public school in England, Dukes was able to closely monitor and observe the symptoms of the ill boys. In his notes, Dukes recorded the signs, symptoms, and rash onset dates of each of the cases he identified. Dukes described how the boys developed an infectious rash that covered their entire bodies within a few hours. He described the rash as being a bright rosy red color with eruptions that raised from the surface of the skin. Dukes also noted that their fauces were red and swollen and that their conjunctiva were pink and stuffused. Additionally, he described the ill boys' lymphatic glands as being enlarged, hard, and tender.

Dukes initially referred to the disease as a scarlet fever variety of rubella, but after further investigation, he determined that the rash affecting the boys was caused by an independent disease entity that he called fourth disease. Although fourth disease was clinically similar to both rubella and scarlet fever, Dukes concluded that the disease affecting the boys could not be rubella because a previously documented case of rubella did not protect against fourth disease. Additionally, Dukes determined that the rash was not caused by scarlet fever because there were documented cases in which both scarlet fever and fourth disease occurred simultaneously in patients.

To further justify that fourth disease was a unique entity, Dukes published "On the Confusion of Two Different Disease Under the Name of Rubella (Rose-Rash)" in The Lancet on July 14, 1900. In this paper, Dukes detailed the distinguishing characteristics between fourth disease, scarlet fever, and rubella. One key difference that Dukes noted between fourth disease and scarlet fever was that fourth disease had a longer incubation period of 9 to 21 days while the incubation period of scarlet fever was reported to very rarely extend beyond the fifth day. Additionally, in scarlet fever, the patient's eyes appear normal and albuminuria is frequent as opposed to in fourth disease in which a patient's eyes appear pink and the kidneys are rarely affected. Dukes also differentiated between rubella and fourth disease by describing how the rash associated with rubella had different clinical characteristics when compared to the rash associated with fourth disease. The rash caused by rubella was described as being patchy with pink spots that are scattered while the rash associated with fourth disease presented as bright red papules that covered the entire body.

Despite Dukes' claim that fourth disease was a unique disease, its existence was debated. J. W. Washburn responded to Dukes in 1901 by arguing that the cases that Dukes diagnosed as fourth disease were likely either rubella or mild cases of scarlet fever, and therefore, Dukes did not provide enough evidence for the existence of fourth disease. Similarly, C. Killick Millard questioned Dukes' claim by proposing that the cases described as fourth disease by Dukes were probably rubella, scarlet fever, or rubella concurrent with scarlet fever. Many years later in 1991, an epidemiological evaluation conducted by David M. Moreno and Alan R. Katz corroborated both Washburn's and Millard's conclusions that there is no evidence that fourth disease existed and that the cases described by Dukes as being fourth disease were actually cases of either rubella or scarlet fever that were misdiagnosed by Dukes.

Alternatively, Dr. Keith R. Powell proclaimed that what Dukes identified as fourth disease was actually expanded staphylococcal scalded skin syndrome (SSSS) caused by the staphylococcal epidermolytic exotoxin. He argued that the characteristics of fourth disease described by Dukes such as the abrupt onset of the disease and flaking of the skin after a few days of the onset of the rash are consistent with SSSS. As of today, it is still unclear whether or not Dukes disease ever existed or whether it currently exists, but is now known under a different name.

== News ==
On December 8, 2022, there were reports of at least five countries in the European Union who informed the World Health Organization (WHO) about a rise in an invasive GAS (group A streptococcus) case. Some noting an increase in scarlet fever instances while others reported a rise in other unknown GAS-related fatalities, primarily affecting children who were under 10 years old. Normally, GAS infections result in mild to moderate symptoms such as tonsilitis, pharyngitis, scarlet fever, cellulitis, impetigo, but in some rare cases, can progress to invasive GAS that can be life-threatening.

This increase in infection signifies an early start to the GAS infection season, coinciding with a rise in respiratory virus circulation and possible viral coinfections that could elevate the risk of invasive GAS disease. At this moment, the specific condition is unknown and it could certainly be related to various rash-like symptoms associated with Dukes' disease. However, despite the rise in GAS cases, the WHO currently considers the risk of GAS-related infections to the general population to be low.

Between January 1 and March 24 of 2024, the UK Health Security Agency (UKHSA) reported at least 12,000 cases of what it may have been associated with scarlet fever and signs of Dukes' in England. This number is higher than the five-year average but lower than the 15,933 cases reported during the same period back in 2023. Dr. Theresa Lamagni from UKHSA highlighted that while scarlet fever is a common childhood illness, it can affect individuals of any age. The symptoms reported were extremely similar to that of Dukes', including fever, a sandpapery rash, sore throat, and swollen tonsils. Currently, the only effective treatment in targeting the numbered diseases is the use of antibiotics, as it can reduce complications and prevent the spread of the infection. In addition, to prevent the spread, regular hand washing, good ventilation at home, and avoiding close contact with others while symptomatic are strongly recommended. Infected individuals should stay away from nursery, school, or work for at least 24 hours after starting antibiotics. In certain rare cases, the illness can evolve to invasive GAS cases, and possibly with Dukes presentation symptoms. When there are signs of GAS infections, netizens should take imminent precautions to seek emergency medical attention, especially if the child has difficulty breathing, pauses in breathing, irregular pulses, gasps for air, blue or greyish skin, tongue, or lips.

Although the numbers are concerning, it is not something that would impose a global pandemic. There have been annual reports from Europe, Canada, and the U.S. indicating a recent surge in severe invasive GAS cases and what may be associated with Dukes' and Scarlet Fever, with notable increases in pediatric cases, some resulting in death. The surge often occurs around the same time during the summer and fall months, rather than the typical winter and spring. In the U.S. alone, the Centers for Disease Control and Prevention (CDC) has reported early and elevated levels of those said infections from 2023 and beyond, particularly among children, coinciding with increased cases in respiratory viruses. Although severe GAS infections decreased during the COVID-19 pandemic, they have since risen, possibly due to reduced immunity and reluctance to see treatment.

However, despite the resurgence, antibiotics remain effective against treating GAS cases associated with Scarlet Fever and Dukes', and there is no evidence of increased resistance of new genetic variants. Parents are still advised to take careful precautions to reduce the risk of infection such as the steps outlined previously. Early recognition and treatment are crucial to preventing complications and ensuring recovery all the while avoiding any bacterial mutation and unwanted evolutions.
