= Target lesion =

Rash with central clearing

In dermatology, a target lesion or bull's-eye lesion, named for its resemblance to the bull's-eye of a shooting target, is a rash with central clearing. It occurs in several diseases, as follows:

- Target lesions are the typical lesions of erythema multiforme, in which a vesicle is surrounded by an often hemorrhagic maculopapule. Erythema multiforme is often self-limited, of acute onset, resolves in three to six weeks, and has a cyclical pattern. Its lesions are multiform (polymorphous) and include macules, papules, vesicles, and bullae.
- Target lesions are also typical of Lyme disease. In the context of Lyme disease, the target lesion is synonymous with erythema migrans (erythema chronicum migrans), although not everyone who gets Lyme disease will have a target-shaped rash, and some will have no rash at all.

== Causes ==
Such lesions may be idiopathic or may follow infections, drug therapy, or immunodeficiency.

== Morphology ==
The target lesion consists of three zones :

1. Dark centre of small papule, vesicle, or bulla (iris)
2. Pale intermediate zone
3. Peripheral rim of erythema (redness)
