= Michaelis–Gutmann bodies =

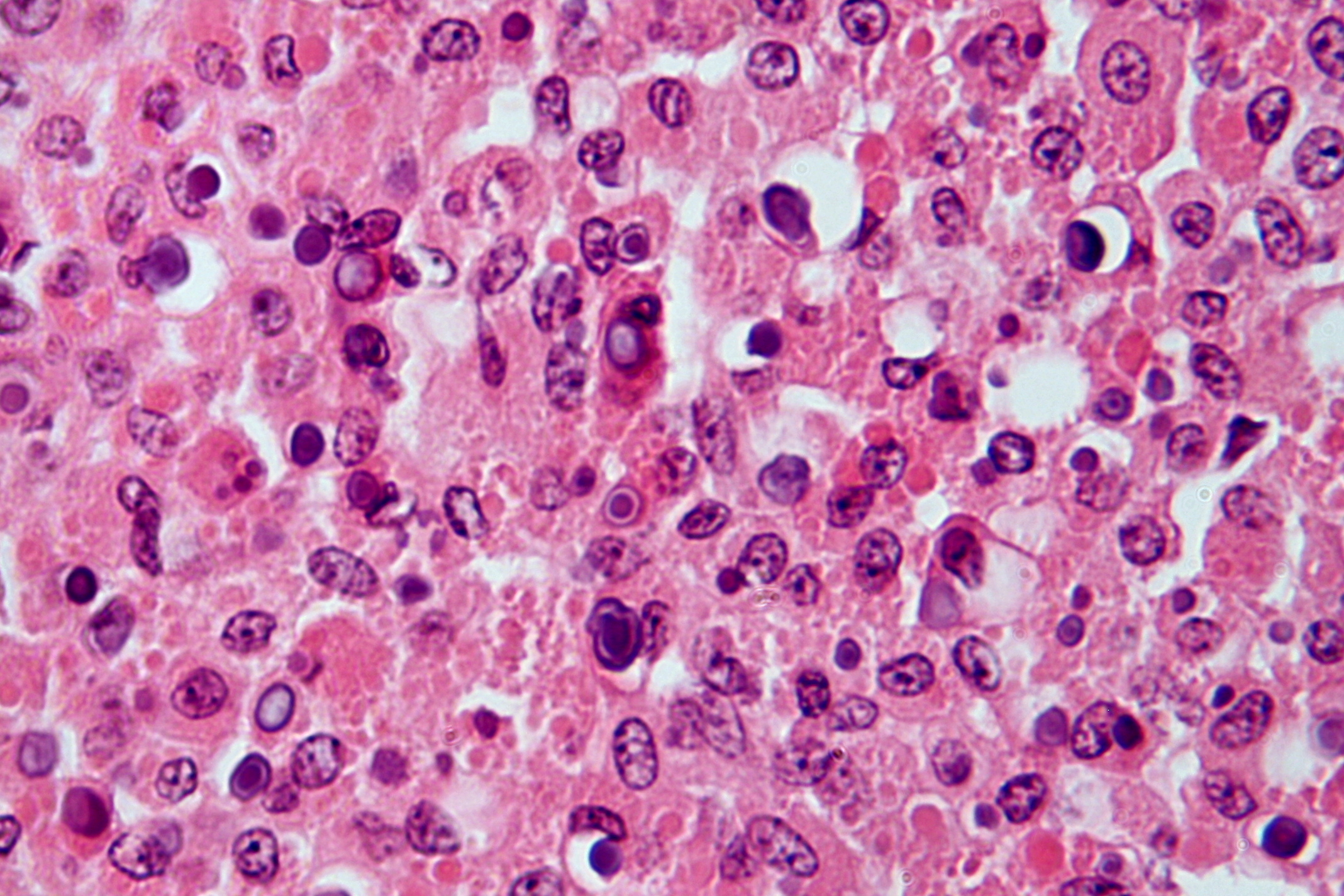
Micrograph showing Michaelis-Gutmann bodies. H&E stain.

Michaelis–Gutmann bodies (M–G bodies) are concentrically layered basophilic inclusions found in Hansemann cells in the urinary tract. These are 2 to 10 μm in diameter, and are thought to represent remnants of phagosomes mineralized by iron and calcium deposits.

M–G bodies are a pathognomonic feature of malakoplakia, an inflammatory condition that affects the genitourinary tract. They were initially discovered in 1902 by Leonor Michaelis and Carl Gutmann.

Michaelis–Gutmann bodies stain positive for von kossa (calcium), Prussian Blue (iron), and PAS diastase stain.
