= Erythema multiforme major =

Severe rash with skin loss or detachment

- Other names: Erythema multiforme majus
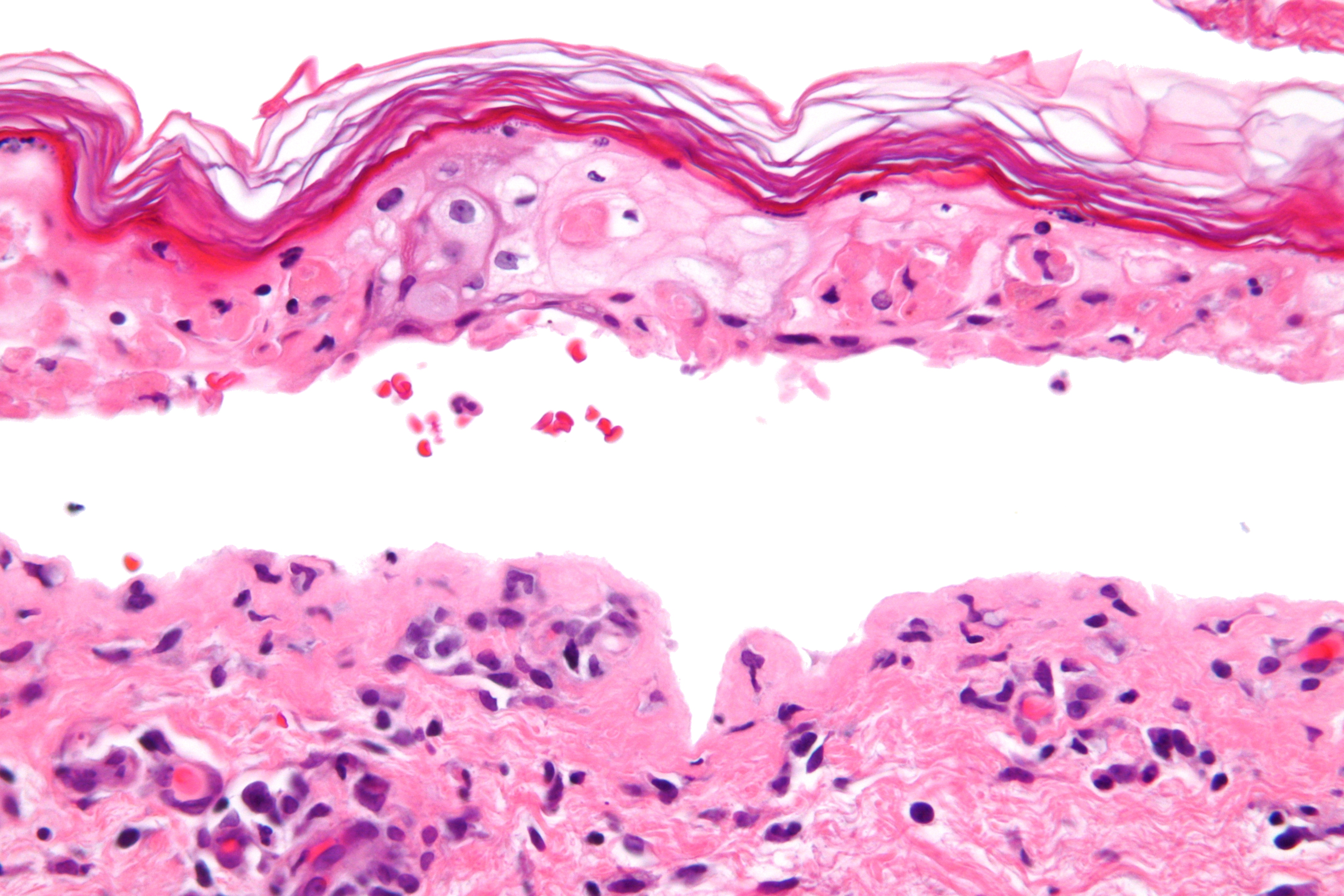
- Micrograph of confluent epidermal necrosis. H&E stain.
- Specialty: Dermatology

In dermatology, erythema multiforme major is a form of rash with skin loss or epidermal detachment.

The term "erythema multiforme majus" is sometimes used to imply a bullous (blistering) presentation.

According to some sources, there are two conditions included on a spectrum of this same disease process:

- Stevens–Johnson syndrome (SJS)
- Toxic epidermal necrolysis (TEN) which described by Alan Lyell and previously called Lyell syndrome[5].

In this view, EM major, SJS and TEN are considered a single condition, distinguished by degree of epidermal detachment.

However, a consensus classification separates erythema multiforme minor, erythema multiforme major, and SJS/TEN as three separate entities.
