= Erythema multiforme =

Immune hypersensitivity reaction causing rash

Erythema multiforme (EM)
- Erythema multiforme minor of the hands (note the blanching centers of the lesion)
- Specialty: Dermatology, immunology
- Symptoms: Rash, skin eruptions, fever, mucosal lesions
- Causes: Type IV hypersensitivity
- Risk factors: Herpes simplex virus infection
- Differential diagnosis: Stevens-Johnson syndrome/Toxic epidermal necrolysis
- Treatment: Corticosteroids, antivirals (HSV-associated cases only)

Erythema multiforme (EM) is an immune-mediated inflammatory skin condition associated with several viral infections, that appears with red patches evolving into target lesions, typically on both hands. It is typically associated with infection by either herpes simplex virus or Mycoplasma pneumoniae.

It is a type IV hypersensitivity reaction in which T-lymphocytes target skin keratinocytes due to the presence of specific proteins that resemble antigens of HSV, Mycoplasma, or other pathogens and foreign substances. It is an uncommon disorder, with peak incidence in the second and third decades of life. The disorder has various forms or presentations, which its name reflects (multiforme, "multiform", from multi- + formis). Target lesions are a typical manifestation. Two standard types, one mild to moderate and one severe, are recognized (erythema multiforme minor and erythema multiforme major), as well as several rare and atypical types.

== Signs and symptoms ==
The condition varies from a mild, self-limited rash (E. multiforme minor) to a severe, life-threatening form known as erythema multiforme major (or erythema multiforme majus) that also involves mucous membranes. Consensus classification:

- Erythema multiforme minor—typical targets or raised, edematous papules distributed acrally (on fingers and toes)
- Erythema multiforme major—typical targets or raised, edematous papules distributed acrally with involvement of one or more mucous membranes; epidermal detachment involves less than 10% of total body surface area

The mild form usually presents with mildly itchy (but itching can be very severe), pink-red blotches, symmetrically arranged and starting on the extremities. It often takes on the classical "target lesion" appearance, with a pink-red ring around a pale center. Resolution within 7–10 days is the norm.

Individuals with persistent (chronic) erythema multiforme will often have a lesion form at an injury site, e.g. a minor scratch or abrasion, within a week. Irritation or even pressure from clothing will cause the erythema sore to continue to expand along its margins for weeks or months, long after the original sore at the center heals.

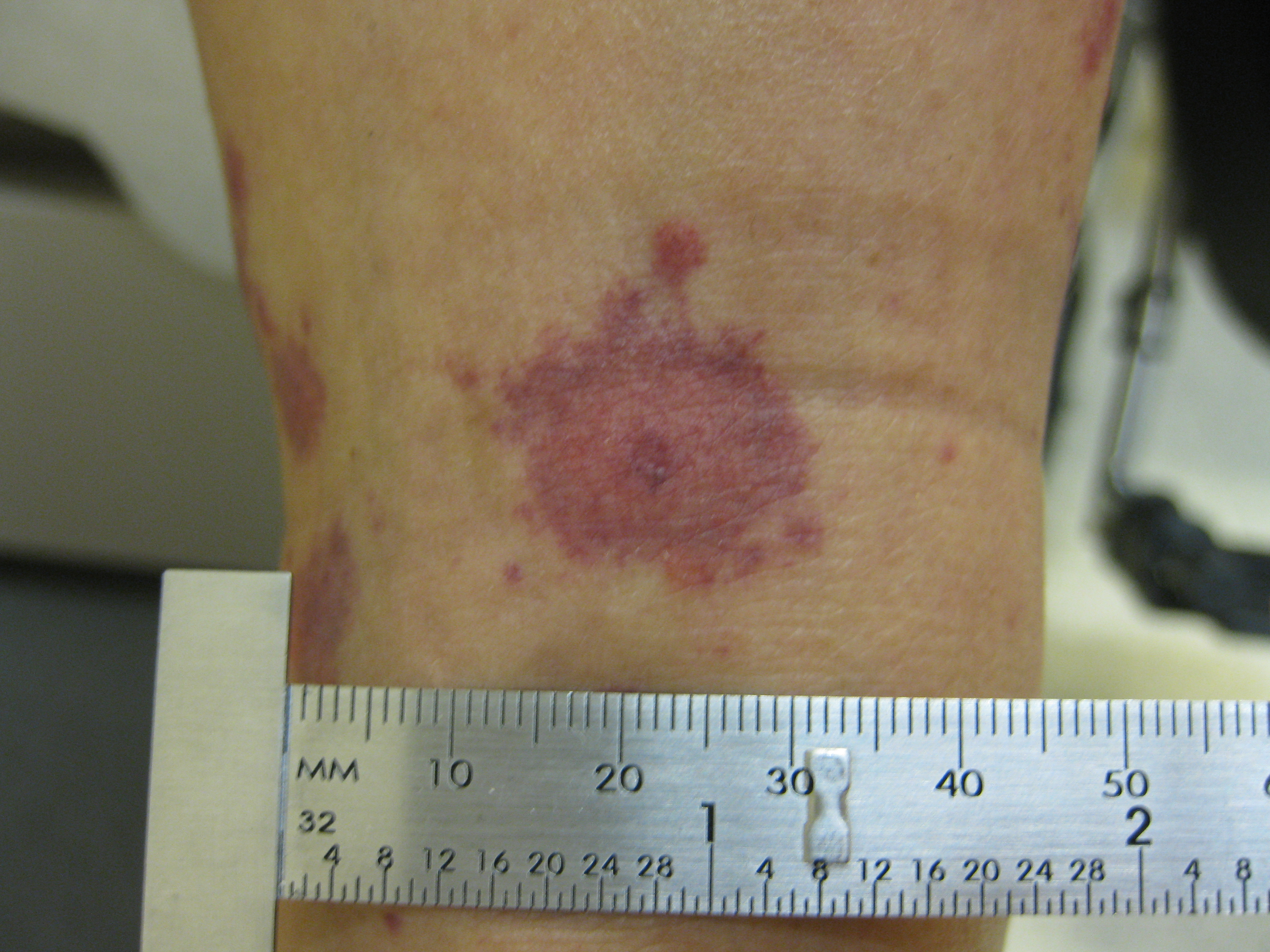
Target lesion

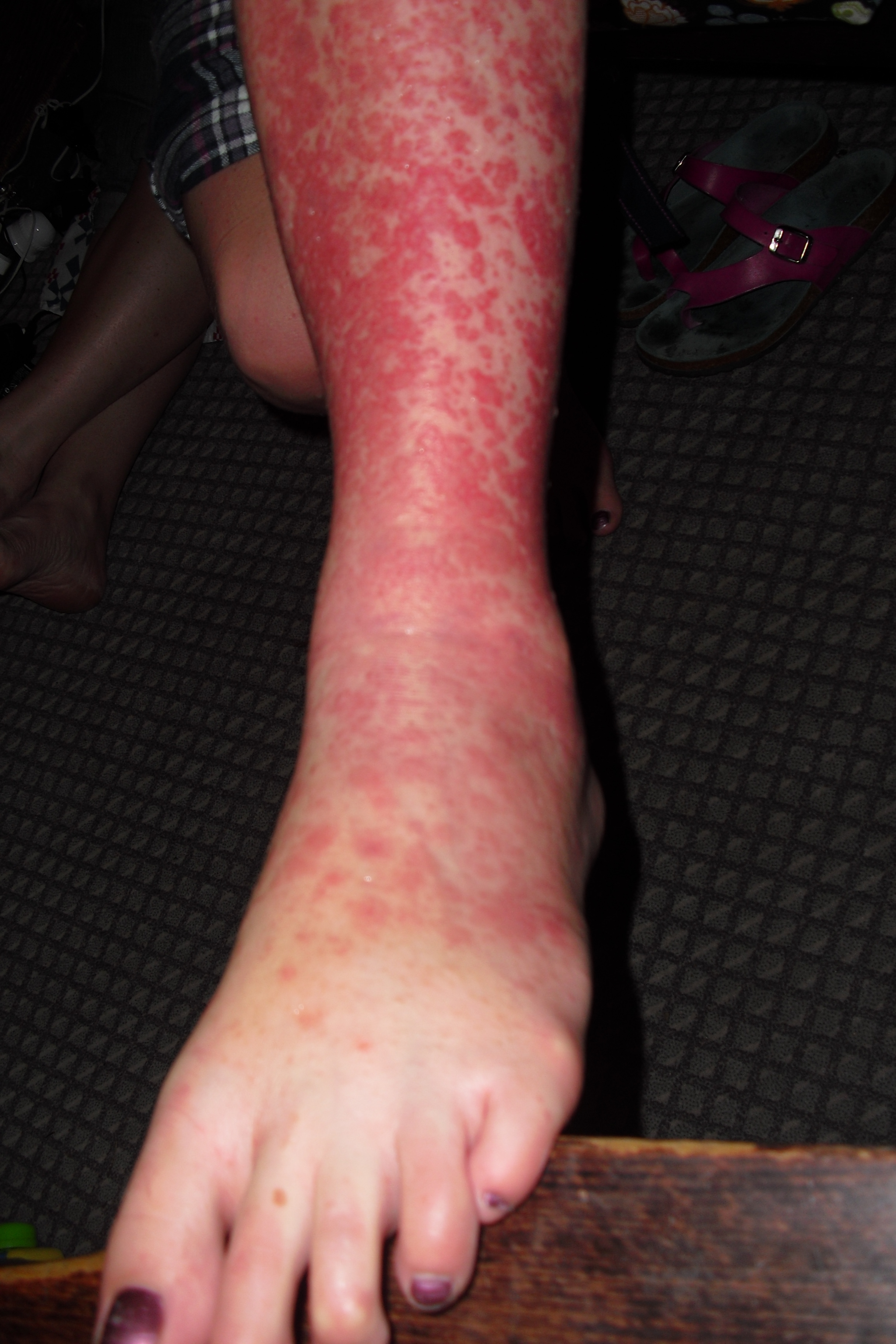
Erythema Multiforme target lesions on the leg

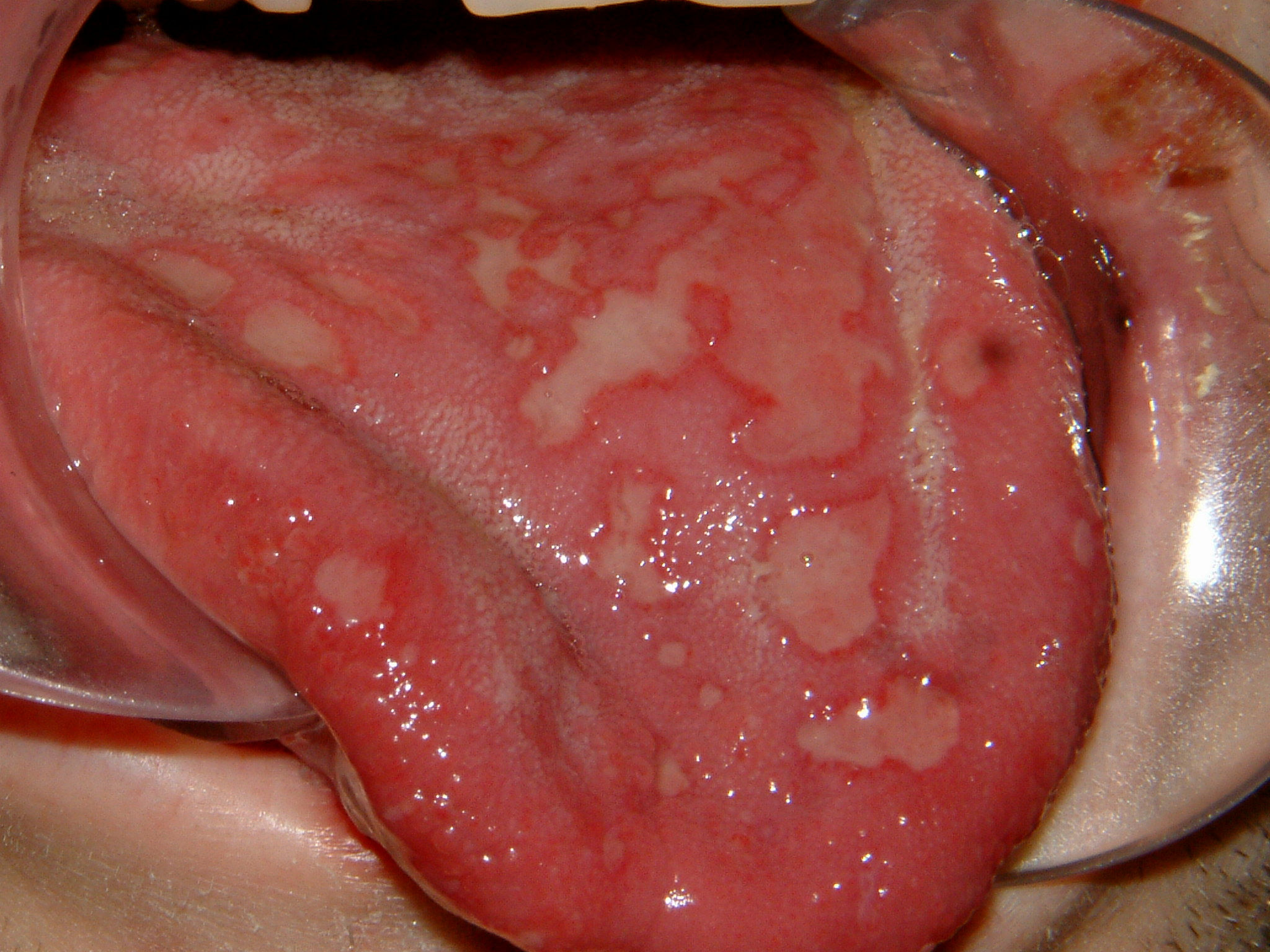
Erythema multiforme of tongue

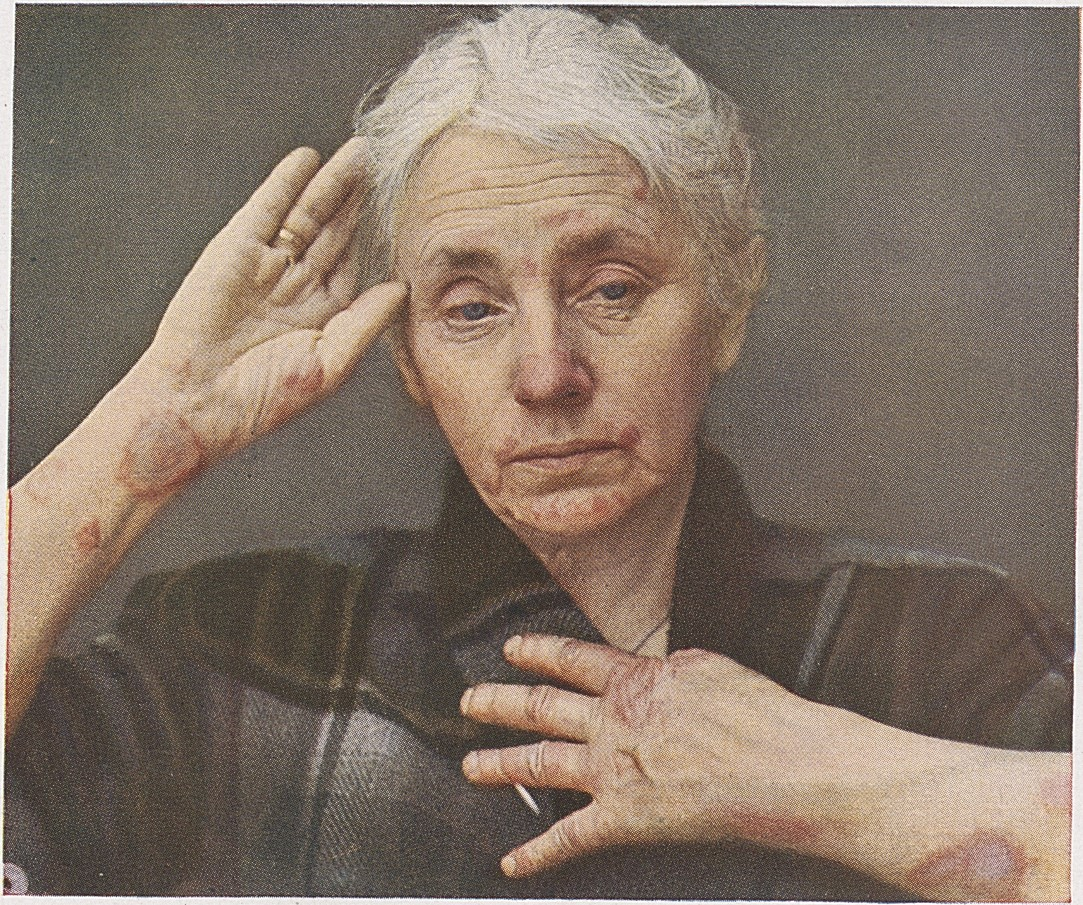
Erythema multiforme of head and limbs

== Causes ==
Erythema multiforme typically arises as a type IV hypersensitivity reaction to certain infections or, rarely, certain medications. The most common trigger is an infection with any type of the herpes simplex virus. The second most common trigger, and the most common in children, is infection with Mycoplasma pneumoniae, most commonly as an atypical pneumonia. When the body encounters these triggers, the immune system responds by activating various cells to fight off what it perceives as harmful invaders. Certain medications and other infections are also sometimes identified as causes of erythema multiforme, and while some experts doubt any true association with EM, others disagree, citing the lack of any HSV DNA found in cases of drug-associated EM.

The pathogenic immune response in EM involves both CD4+ helper T cells and CD8+ cytotoxic T cells, which orchestrate a type IV hypersensitivity reaction. Upon activation, these T cells release proinflammatory cytokines such as IFN-γ and TNF-α. Despite the known association with IFN-γ, erythema multiforme is not considered a humorally-mediated autoimmune reaction.

Rarely, some patients may have a persistent and treatment-resistant form of erythema multiforme caused by the Epstein-Barr virus. This pathology is distinct from the recurrent cases that sometimes arise from HSV-associated EM.

Stevens–Johnson syndrome and toxic epidermal necrolysis used to be considered part of the erythema multiforme "spectrum," but EM is now recognized as a fundamentally different condition. In addition to the differing pathogenesis, SJS/TEN also differs in its clinical characteristics, and may be excluded based on clinical characteristics alone.

=== Herpes simplex virus ===
Herpes simplex virus (HSV) is by far the most frequent cause of erythema multiforme. HSV DNA is also detected in nearly half of patients with idiopathic EM, suggesting that the true frequency is even higher than traditionally thought. Because of this frequency, more is understood about EM caused by HSV than any other type.

100% of HSV-associated EM cases are found to have DNA for viral-type DNA polymerase (Pol) gene within keratinocytes. Despite this association, an active and infectious form of HSV has never been found in a patient with EM, indicating that it is exclusively a post-viral hypersensitivity syndrome in these patients, rather than a symptom of the virus itself. The viral DNA polymerase protein is synthesized by basal keratinocytes, which then present the protein or fragments of its DNA to immune cells via MHC I. The resulting immune reaction results in the creation of CD8+ T-cells specific to HSV, which then induce a strong inflammatory response, recruiting other immune cells to places where infected keratinocytes are identified. Keratinocyte production of Pol protein only lasts for a few days, however, so most HSV-related cases of erythema multiforme do not become chronic or recurrent. However, recurrence is a known possibility with this type of EM, potentially justifying the use of preventative antiviral therapy.

== Treatment ==
Drug-induced erythema multiforme should be treated by immediately stopping the causative medication. Cases of idiopathic or infection-associated erythema multiforme may or may not be treated, depending on the underlying cause and the severity of the EM. Acute cases of erythema multiforme are often diagnosed clinically, based on symptom presentation, and treated with systemic steroid medications. Cases of EM known to be associated with HSV are frequently treated with antiviral medications such as acyclovir.

== See also ==
- Erythema multiforme major
- Erythema multiforme minor
- Toxic epidermal necrolysis
- Stevens–Johnson syndrome
