= Exanthem =

Widespread rash occurring on the body

- Other names: Exanthema
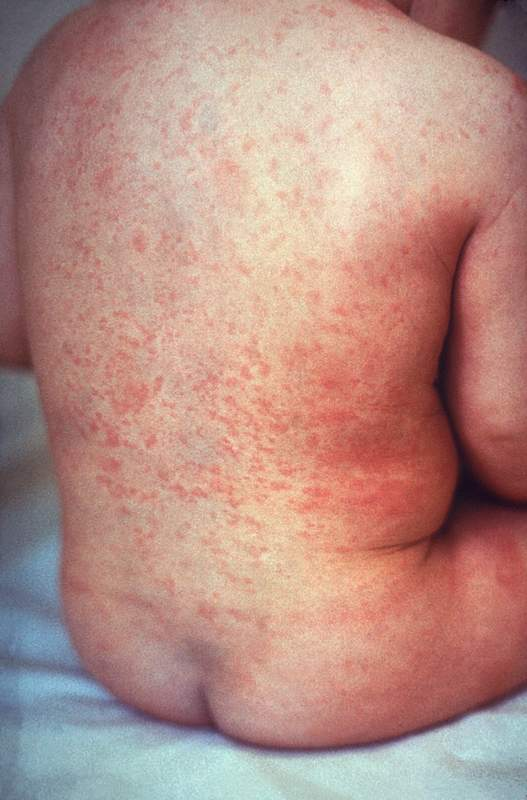
- Rash seen in rubella
- Specialty: Dermatology

An exanthem is a widespread rash eruption occurring on the outside of the body, usually presents in children, the rash is typically associated with constitutional symptoms including fever and fatigue. It is usually caused by a virus, but an exanthem can be caused by bacteria, toxins, drugs, other microorganisms, or as a result of autoimmune disease. Exanthems associated with viruses are usually not specific but some are pathognomonic for certain viruses, the rash is not caused by the virus itself but the body's reaction to the virus.

The term exanthem is from the Greek ἐξάνθημα, exánthēma, 'a breaking out'. It can be contrasted with enanthems which occur inside the body, such as on mucous membranes. Exanthems occasionally present in association with enanthems .

== Infectious exanthem ==
in 1900, the physician Clement Dukes assigned a number for the known exanthems affecting the pediatric age group which are first disease (measles), second disease (scarlet fever), third disease (rubella), and fourth disease (filatove-dukes). In 1905, the Russian-French physician Léon Cheinisse added fifth disease which is now known as erythema infectiosum or slapped cheek syndrome. In 1909, sixth disease (roselola infantum or exanthem subitum) was introduced by John Zahorsky.

Of these six "classical" infectious childhood exanthems, four are viral. Numbers were provided in 1905.

The four viral exanthems have much in common, and are often studied together as a class. They are:

| Name | Number | Virus | Rash characteristics |
|---|---|---|---|
| Measles (rubeola) | "first disease" | measles virus | Erythematous macules and papules appearing first on the head and spread down over body over 3 days. Enanthem: pathognomonic Koplik spots (punctate blue-white erosions on buccal mucosa) |
| Rubella, ("German measles") identified in 1881. | "third disease" | rubella virus | Pink macules and papules that appear first on the head and spread down over body in 24 hours. Rash disappears in 2–3 days. Enanthem: Forcheimmer sign (punctate petechiae on soft palate or uvula) |
| Erythema infectiosum, identified as a distinct condition in 1896. | "fifth disease" | parvovirus B19 | Confluent erythematous and edematous patches on cheeks ("slapped cheek") for 1–4 days followed by a "lacy," reticular, erythematous rash on the body. |
| Roseola infantum (exanthem subitum) | "sixth disease" | HHV-6 and HHV-7 | Rapid onset of erythematous, blanching macules and papules surrounded by white halos on the trunk after 3–5 days of high fever. The rash spreads to the neck and body extremities and lasts 1–2 days. |

Scarlet fever, or "second disease", is associated with the bacterium Streptococcus pyogenes. Fourth disease, also known as "Dukes' disease", is a condition whose existence is not widely accepted today. It was described in 1900 and is postulated to be related to the bacterium Staphylococcus aureus.

In 1979 and 2001 a possible "seventh disease" was postulated following reports of a condition in Japan also referred to as acute febrile infantile mucocutaneous lymph node syndrome (MCLS).

Many other common viruses apart from the ones mentioned above can also produce an exanthem as part of their presentation, though they are not considered part of the classic numbered list:

- Varicella zoster virus (chickenpox or shingles)
- Mumps
- rhinovirus (the common cold)
- unilateral laterothoracic exanthem of childhood
- Some types of viral haemorrhagic fever are also known to produce a systemic rash of this kind during the progression of the disease.
- Tick-borne diseases like Rocky Mountain spotted fever produce a rash that may become extensive enough so as to be classified as exanthemous in as many as 90% of children with the disease.

== See also ==
- List of cutaneous conditions
