= Neuroborreliosis =

Central nervous system disorder

- Other names: Lyme neuroborreliosis (LNB)
- Specialty: Infectious diseases
- Symptoms: Stiff neck (meningitis), facial nerve palsy, and radiculoneuritis

Neuroborreliosis is a disorder of the central nervous system. A neurological manifestation of Lyme disease, neuroborreliosis is caused by a systemic infection of spirochetes of the genus Borrelia. Symptoms of the disease include erythema migrans and flu-like symptoms.

== Signs and symptoms ==
Neuroborreliosis is often preceded by the typical symptoms of Lyme disease, which include erythema migrans and flu-like symptoms such as fever and muscle aches. Neurologic symptoms of neuroborreliosis include the meningoradiculitis (which is more common in European patients), cranial nerve abnormalities, and altered mental status. Sensory findings may also be present. Rarely, a progressive form of encephalomyelitis may occur. In children, symptoms of neuroborreliosis include headache, sleep disturbance, and symptoms associated with increased intracranial pressure, such as papilledema. Less common childhood symptoms can include meningitis, myelitis, ataxia, and chorea. Ocular Lyme disease has also been reported, as has neuroborreliosis affecting the spinal cord, but neither of these findings are common.

Neuroborreliosis has also been documented to present with a variety of psychiatric symptoms including psychotic and mood alterations. These can include paranoia, delusions, olfactory, auditory and visual hallucinations, dementia, major depression, catatonia, and mania. These symptoms may appear well after initial infection. One case of schizoaffective disorder linked to Lyme infection appeared seven years after the diagnosis and treatment of a Lyme infection.

== Diagnosis ==
=== Differential diagnosis ===
A number of diseases can produce symptoms similar to those of Lyme neuroborreliosis. They include:

- Acute disseminated encephalomyelitis
- Viral meningitis
- Multiple sclerosis
- Bell's palsy

Diagnosis is determined by clinical examination of visible symptoms. Neuroborreliosis can also be diagnosed serologically to confirm clinical examination via western blot, ELISA, and PCR.

== Treatment ==
In the US, neuroborreliosis is typically treated with intravenous antibiotics which cross the blood–brain barrier, such as penicillins, ceftriaxone, or cefotaxime. One relatively small randomized controlled trial suggested ceftriaxone was more effective than penicillin in the treatment of neuroborreliosis. Small observational studies suggest ceftriaxone is also effective in children. The recommended duration of treatment is 14 to 28 days.

Several studies from Europe have suggested oral doxycycline is as effective as intravenous ceftriaxone in treating neuroborreliosis. Doxycycline has not been widely studied as a treatment in the US, but antibiotic sensitivities of prevailing European and US isolates of Borrelia burgdorferi tend to be identical. However, doxycycline is generally not prescribed to children due to the risk of bone and tooth damage.

Discredited treatments for neuroborreliosis include:

- Malariotherapy
- Hyperbaric oxygen therapy
- Colloidal silver
- Injections of hydrogen peroxide and bismacine

== See also ==
- Tick-borne disease
