= Bannwart =

Bannwart is a German surname of Swiss origin. Notable people with the surname include:

- Alexander Bannwart (1880–1959), Swiss-American businessman
- Roman Bannwart (1919–2010), Swiss Roman Catholic theologian, priest, and musician
- Stéphanie Bannwart (born 1991), Swiss volleyball player
- Walter Bannwart (1927-20??), Swiss footballer

== See also ==
- Alfred Bannwarth (1903–1970), German neurologist
