= Acrodermatitis chronica atrophicans =

- Other names: Herxheimer disease and Primary diffuse atrophy
- Specialty: Dermatology
- Causes: untreated infection with Borrelia afzelii

Acrodermatitis chronica atrophicans (ACA) is a skin rash indicative of the third or late stage of European Lyme borreliosis.

ACA is a dermatological condition that takes a chronically progressive course and finally leads to a widespread atrophy of the skin. Involvement of the peripheral nervous system is often observed, specifically polyneuropathy.

This progressive skin process is due to the effect of continuing active infection with the spirochete Borrelia afzelii, which is the predominant pathophysiology. B. afzelii may not be the exclusive etiologic agent of ACA; Borrelia garinii has also been detected.

== Presentation ==
The rash caused by ACA is most evident on the extremities. It begins with an inflammatory stage with bluish red discoloration and cutaneous swelling, and concludes several months or years later with an atrophic phase. Sclerotic skin plaques may also develop. As ACA progresses the skin begins to wrinkle (atrophy).

== Diagnosis ==
Generally a two-step approach is followed. First, a screening test involving IgM and IgG ELISA. If the ELISA screening has a positive or equivocal result, then the second step is to perform a Western Blot as a confirmatory test.

Other methods include microscopy and culture (in modified Kelly's medium) of skin biopsy or blood samples.

== Treatment ==
Antibiotics is recommended in treatment of ACA. Doxycycline is often used. Resolution may take several months. Skin damage and nerve damage may persist after treatment.

== History ==
The first record of ACA was made in 1883 in Breslau, Germany, where a physician named Alfred Buchwald first delineated it.Herxheimer and Hartmann described it in 1902 as a "tissue paper like" cutaneous atrophy.

== See also ==
- Erythema migrans
- List of cutaneous conditions
- Lyme disease

== Bibliography ==
- Stanek G & Strle F (2008) Lyme Disease—European Perspective| Infectious Disease Clinics of North America | Volume 22 | Issue 2 | June 2008, Pages 327-339|Abstract
