= Lymphocytic meningoradiculitis =

- Other names: Bannwarth Syndrome

Lymphocytic meningoradiculitis, also known as Bannwarth syndrome, is a neurological disease characterized as intense nerve pain radiating from the spine. The disease is caused by an infection of Borrelia burgdorferi, a tick-borne spirochete bacterium also responsible for causing Lyme disease.

== Signs and symptoms ==
Lymphocytic meningoradiculitis is characterized by an intense spinal pain in the lumbar and cervical regions, radiating to the extremities. Symptoms may include facial paralysis, abducens palsy, anorexia, tiredness, headache, double vision, paraesthesia, and erythema migrans.

== Treatment ==
Lymphocytic meningoradiculitis is treated with antibiotics. Oral doxycycline or IV ceftriaxone are typically recommended for 14–21 days.

== History ==
The disease was first reported in 1941 by German neurologist, Alfred Bannwarth, who described the main symptoms as intense radicular pain, facial palsy, severe headaches, and vomiting. A common feature he observed in his infected patients was an abnormal increase of lymphocytes in their cerebrospinal fluid (CSF).

== See also ==
- Tick-borne disease
