= Bismacine =

Patent medicine

Bismacine, also known as Chromacine, is a substance manufactured by American Biologics Corporation and marketed as a purported alternative treatment for Lyme disease. Bismacine is based on bismuth compounds, and two deaths have followed the use of intravenous bismacine to treat Lyme disease. In 2006, the U.S. Food and Drug Administration warned consumers not to use bismacine, noting that it is ineffective and dangerous.
