= Cefuroxime =

Antibiotic medication

Clinical data
- Trade names: Zinacef, others
- AHFS/Drugs.com: Monograph
- MedlinePlus: a601206
- License data: US DailyMed: Cefuroxime
- Routes of administration: Intramuscular, intravenous, by mouth
- Drug class: Second-generation cephalosporin
- ATC code: J01DC02 (WHO) S01AA27 (WHO) QJ51DC02 (WHO)

Legal status
- Legal status: AU: S4 (Prescription only); CA: ℞-only; In general: ℞ (Prescription only)

Pharmacokinetic data
- Bioavailability: 37% on an empty stomach, up to 52% if taken after food
- Elimination half-life: 80 minutes
- Excretion: Urine 66–100% unchanged

Identifiers
- IUPAC name: (6R,7R)-3-{[(Aminocarbonyl)oxy]methyl}-7-{[(2Z)-2-(2-furyl)-2-(methoxyimino)acetyl]amino}-8-oxo-5-thia-1-azabicyclo[4.2.0]oct-2-ene-2-carboxylic acid
- CAS Number: 55268-75-2
- PubChem CID: 5479529
- DrugBank: DB01112
- ChemSpider: 4586393
- UNII: O1R9FJ93ED
- KEGG: D00262
- ChEMBL: ChEMBL466
- CompTox Dashboard (EPA): DTXSID5022774
- ECHA InfoCard: 100.054.127

Chemical and physical data
- Formula: C_{16}H_{16}N_{4}O_{8}S
- Molar mass: 424.38 g·mol^{−1}
- 3D model (JSmol): Interactive image
- SMILES: CO/N=C(/C1=CC=CO1)\C(=O)N[C@H]2[C@@H]3N(C2=O)C(=C(CS3)COC(=O)N)C(=O)O
- InChI: InChI=1S/C16H16N4O8S/c1-26-19-9(8-3-2-4-27-8)12(21)18-10-13(22)20-11(15(23)24)7(5-28-16(17)25)6-29-14(10)20/h2-4,10,14H,5-6H2,1H3,(H2,17,25)(H,18,21)(H,23,24)/b19-9-/t10-,14-/m1/s1; Key:JFPVXVDWJQMJEE-IZRZKJBUSA-N

Cefuroxime, sold under the brand name Zinacef among others, is a second-generation cephalosporin antibiotic used to treat and prevent a number of bacterial infections. These include pneumonia, meningitis, otitis media, sepsis, urinary tract infections, and Lyme disease. It is used by mouth or by injection into a vein or muscle.

Common side effects include nausea, diarrhea, allergic reactions, and pain at the site of injection. Serious side effects may include Clostridioides difficile infection, anaphylaxis, and Stevens–Johnson syndrome. Use in pregnancy and breastfeeding is believed to be safe. It is a second-generation cephalosporin and works by interfering with a bacteria's ability to make a cell wall resulting in its death.

Cefuroxime was patented in 1971 and approved for medical use in 1977. It is on the World Health Organization's List of Essential Medicines. In 2023, it was the 279th most commonly prescribed medication in the United States, with more than 700,000 prescriptions.

== Medical uses ==
Cefuroxime is active against many bacteria including susceptible strains of Staphylococci and Streptococci, as well as a range of gram negative organisms. As with the other cephalosporins, it is susceptible to beta-lactamase, although as a second-generation variety, it is less so. Hence, it may have greater activity against Haemophilus influenzae, Neisseria gonorrhoeae, and Lyme disease. Unlike other second-generation cephalosporins, cefuroxime can cross the blood–brain barrier.

A systematic review found high quality evidence that injecting the eye with cefuroxime after cataract surgery will lower the chance of developing endophthalmitis after surgery.

== Side effects ==
Cefuroxime is generally well tolerated, and its side effects are usually transient. If ingested after food, this antibiotic is both better absorbed and less likely to cause its most common side effects of diarrhea, nausea, vomiting, headaches/migraines, dizziness, insomnia and abdominal pain.

Although a widely stated cross-allergic risk of about 10% exists between cephalosporins and penicillin, an assessment in 2006 has shown no increased risk for a cross-allergic reaction for cefuroxime and several other second-generation or later cephalosporins.

== Related compounds ==
Cefuroxime axetil is an acetoxyethyl ester prodrug of cefuroxime which is effective when taken by mouth. It is a second-generation cephalosporin.

== Trade names ==
In the US it is marketed as Zinacef by Covis Pharmaceuticals since the company acquired the U.S. rights to the product from GSK. GSK had continued marketing a pediatric oral suspension as Ceftin; however, this product was discontinued in 2017.

In Bangladesh, it is available as Sefur by Opsonin Pharma, Kilbac by Incepta, Axim by Aristopharma, Rofurox by Radiant, Xorimax by Sandoz, and Uroxime by EURO Pharma. In India, it is available as Ceftum and Cefuall by Allencia Biosciences in tablet form and Supacef in injection form by GSK. In India, it has also been marketed by HSK with the trade name Ceftum in different formulations (such as 1.5 gm inj, 250 mg tablet, 500 mg tablet, 125 mg/5 ml dry syrup). In Poland, it is available as Zamur by Mepha, subsidiary of Teva Pharmaceutical Industries. In Australia, the "first generic" form of cefuroxime axetil, Pharmacor Cefuroxime (tablets) from Pharmacor Pty Ltd, was registered on 27 March 2017, by the Therapeutic Goods Administration. Cefuroxime axetil is sold in tablet form in Turkey under the brand names Aksef and Cefaks. Cefuroxime axetil is also available (in two strengths) as granules for oral suspension from Aspen Pharmacare Australia Pty Ltd under the brand name Zinnat cefuroxime.
