= Lymphocytic pleocytosis =

Increase in lymphocytes within cerebrospinal fluid

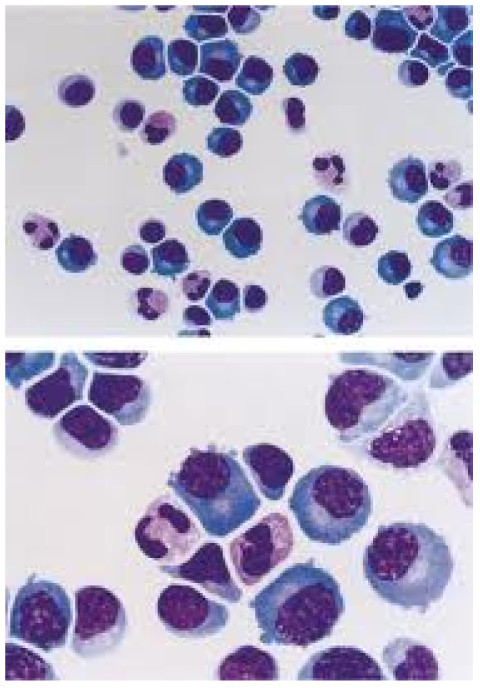
A stain demonstrating an increase in lymphocytes within the cerebrospinal fluid. Concentrations in healthy individuals are usually under 5 white blood cells per μL.

Lymphocytic pleocytosis is an abnormal increase in the amount of lymphocytes in the cerebrospinal fluid (CSF). It is usually considered to be a sign of infection or inflammation within the nervous system, and is encountered in a number of neurological diseases, such as pseudomigraine, Susac's syndrome, and encephalitis. While lymphocytes make up roughly a quarter of all white blood cells (WBC) in the body, they are generally rare in the CSF. Under normal conditions, there are usually less than 5 white blood cells per μL of CSF. In a pleocytic setting, the number of lymphocytes can jump to more than 1,000 cells per μL. Increases in lymphocyte count are often accompanied by an increase in cerebrospinal protein concentrations in addition to pleocytosis of other types of white blood cells.

== Symptoms and signs ==
Though exact concentrations differ based on the specific disease, mild cases of lymphocytic pleocytosis are considered to begin when lymphocyte counts enter the range of 10-100 cells per mm^{3}. In healthy individuals, only 0-5 white blood cells per μL are normally present in the CSF. In patients with pseudomigraines, studies have shown concentrations ranging from 10 to 760 cells per mm^{3}, with a mean concentration of 199 ± 174 cells per mm^{3}. Increases in white blood cell count to more than 500 cells per mm^{3} can cause the CSF to appear cloudy when observed during diagnostic tests. The rise in concentration corresponds to an inflammatory immune response typically seen during viral infections. Despite their diversity, diseases featuring lymphocytic pleocytosis share a number of symptoms, most notably headaches and neurological deficits.

== Causes ==
Cerebral spinal fluid lymphocytic pleocytosis is generally the result of an immune response to neurovascular inflammation. Many cases point to a viral infection as the root cause of pleocytosis, in which the immune system produces antibodies against neuronal and vascular antigens. This evidence possibly connects it to viral meningitis and Mollaret's disease. Certain non-viral infections, such as Lyme disease have also been considered possible causes. In some diseases, an infection precipitates an autoimmune response, leading to increased lymphocyte levels.

== Diagnosis ==
The presence of lymphocytic pleocytosis is generally detected through a lumbar puncture followed by clinical analysis of cerebrospinal fluid. When combined with analysis of the appearance and pressure of the tested CSF, along with measurements for the amount of glucose and proteins present, white blood cell counts can be used to detect or diagnose a number of diseases. Among these are subarachnoid hemorrhage, multiple sclerosis, and the various types of meningitis. While a lumbar puncture may return a WBC count within the normal range of 0-5 cells per μL, this does not rule out the possibility of a disease.

== Diseases ==
Research has found the presence of lymphocytic pleocytosis in the following diseases and documented their respective mechanisms and reactions:

=== Viral encephalitis ===
In encephalitis, the inflammation of the brain leads to a breakdown in neurological function, causing the patient to have symptoms such as fever, confusion, amnesia, personality changes, paralysis, seizures and language dysfunction. A viral infection can directly cause encephalitis or trigger a cascade ending in autoimmunity, with both mechanisms eventually leading to a rise in CSF lymphocyte concentration.

For patients with herpes simplex virus, more than 90% are found to have lymphocytic pleocytosis of varying levels. Intravenous aciclovir, can be used to prevent viral replication, and in the event of persistent lymphocytic pleocytosis, higher doses of aciclovir can also be taken. Studies have shown this treatment combined with valacyclovir to be effective in combating HSV-1 and eventually returning lymphocyte counts to normal.

A viral infection may also result in encephalitis triggered by an autoimmune response. One common form of autoimmune encephalitis, anti-NMDA receptor encephalitis, is thought to be commonly initiated by herpes infections resulting in an autoimmune response to the NR1 subunit of the NMDA receptor. Lymphocytic pleocytosis is involved in the initial stages of the disease. During this period, lymphocytes can number in the hundreds per mm^{3}, while later on, lymphocyte levels have a tendency to return to equilibrium. It has been proposed that this early spike in lymphocytic concentration is the result of the breaching of the blood–brain barrier during the initial viral infection, giving peripheral antibodies access to the central nervous system and leading to the development of autoimmunity.

=== Pseudomigraine ===
Multiple studies have been performed to examine the correlation between pseudomigraines and lymphocytic pleocytosis. A pseudomigraine is characterized by a moderate or severe, typically bilateral throbbing headache accompanied by transient neurological symptoms and lymphocytic pleocytosis. These migraine episodes are recurrent and self-limiting. In these studies, individuals ranging from about 15–40 years of age were examined and the majority of those tested were male. After each migraine episode, the patients were all asymptomatic. When examined via EEG, CT, and MRI forms of imaging, the CT and MRI scans were all normal; however, 30 out of 42 patients had abnormal EEG scans. For 26 of these patients, there was unilateral excessive slowing while 4 of these patients experienced bilateral slowing. In another study, patients displayed an elevated level of lymphocytic pleocytosis with each pseudomigraine episode.

=== Susac's syndrome ===
In Susac's syndrome, an autoimmune response damages the blood vessels of the brain, retina and cochlea, leading to a loss of neurological functions. Patients with the syndrome had hearing and vision loss and were found to have higher concentrations of lymphocytes and proteins in their cerebrospinal fluid. Treatment with immunosuppressive drugs like prednisone followed by azathioprine were found to have significant effects and patients gradually regained lost function, in some cases after only a few weeks.

== Treatments ==
The most appropriate method of returning lymphocyte counts to normal levels is to treat the disease responsible for their increase. For cases in which the root cause is a viral or bacterial infection, drugs that counteract these pathogens have been found to be effective. Since herpes infections often lead to pleocytosis, aciclovir and valacyclovir are commonly prescribed. When pleocytosis is the result of an autoimmune response, immunosuppressive drugs like prednisone can be used.

== History ==
Determination of lymphocytic pleocytosis became possible with the advent of the diagnostic lumbar puncture and the technology necessary to analyze the cerebrospinal fluid via microbiological, biochemical, and immunological tests. While the first lumbar punctures were performed in the late 19th century, the tests revealing elevated lymphocyte levels within the CSF were not available until much later. Modern lumbar punctures testing for lymphocyte counts are commonly used to diagnose or rule out certain diseases such as meningitis and determine whether an infection is present within the CSF.
