= Alfred Bannwarth =

German neurologist

- Born: 1903; Munich, Germany
- Died: 1969 (aged 65–66)
- Known for: Bannwarth's syndrome

Alfred Bannwarth (1903–1969) was a German neurologist who is credited for first reporting lymphocytic meningoradiculitis.

== Biography ==
=== Early life and education ===
After first studying music, Bannwarth studied medicine at the Ludwig-Maximilians-Universität München in Munich, Germany, and later became an assistant to German neurologist Max Nonne at University Medical Center Hamburg-Eppendorf in Hamburg.

=== Military service ===
Bannwarth enlisted as a military doctor in the German military in 1945. During his service, he was stationed in the valley of Lake Tegern, where he was captured by American soldiers and held prisoner until June 1946.
