= Polly Murray =

American Lyme disease patient (1934–2019)

Mary Luckett "Polly" Murray (1934–2019) was a key figure in the recognition of Lyme disease. She was one of the first individuals to document the symptoms of the disease. In 1975, she reported the illness in her family and her community to the Connecticut State Department of Health. Scientists from Yale University who met with Murray are credited with identifying the disease now known as Lyme disease.

Polly Murray was born in New York City. She was raised in Irvington, NY. Murray attended The Masters School in Dobbs Ferry and received a BA from Mount Holyoke College. During a fellowship at the Yale School of Art she studied with the American painter Robert Brackman and the Art Students League of New York.

Murray moved to Lyme, Connecticut in the late 1950s, living in a forested area near the banks of the Connecticut River. Soon after, she began experiencing rashes, migraines, fever and aching joints. Murray's symptoms worsened during the late 1960s and early 1970s. She was unable to paint as a result. She was hospitalized three times in 1971 alone. Doctors were unable to determine the cause of her illness.

Murray's husband and four children all experienced similar symptoms. By the summer of 1975, two of her sons were using crutches due to swollen knees and her son Todd was diagnosed with juvenile rheumatoid arthritis. Murray also became aware of others in her community experiencing symptoms similar to her family's. The symptoms usually began with a red rash, typically followed by fever and joint pain. Murray began compiling a list of those affected. On Thursday October 16, 1975, Murray called the Connecticut State Health Department to report the unusual cluster of disease. The call prompted a meeting between Murray and Alen Steere, a fellow in rheumatology at the Yale School of Medicine. By 1977, Lyme arthritis, now known as Lyme disease, was identified as a new, distinct illness by Steere and his mentor Stephen Malawista. Scientists eventually discovered that deer ticks were responsible for the spread of the disease.

Throughout the 1980s and 1990s Murray worked to raise awareness about Lyme disease. She was involved in fundraising, patient and physician education, and served on Lyme disease support groups and foundations. She published a book to tell her story in 1996, The Widening Circle: A Lyme Disease Pioneer Tells Her Story (St. Martins' Press). Murray received an Alumnae Honorary Degree from Mount Holyoke college in 1996. She also lectured at Case Western Reserve University and Columbia University.
