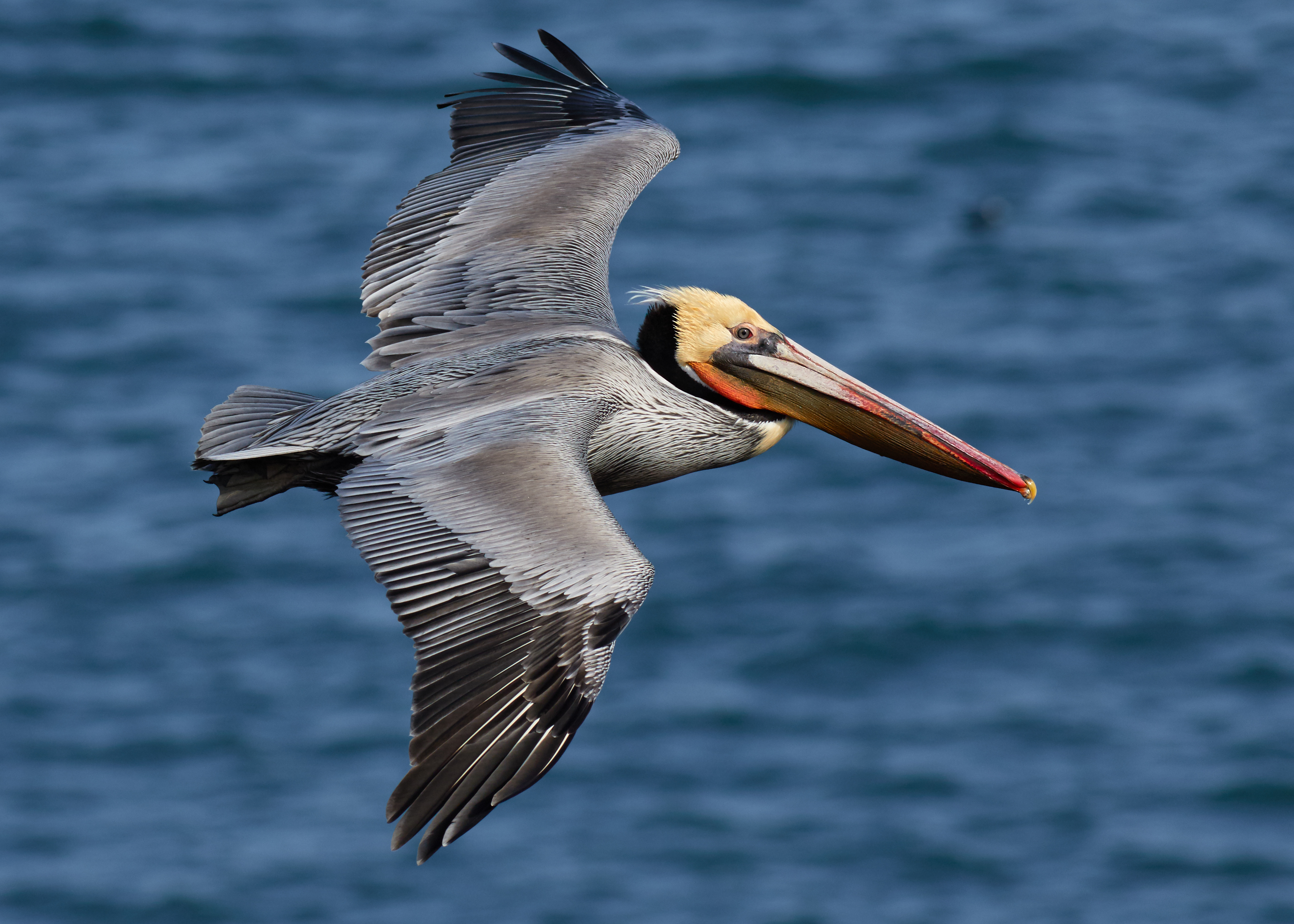

Conservation status
- Least Concern (IUCN 3.1)

- Apparently Secure (NatureServe)

Scientific classification
- Kingdom: Animalia
- Phylum: Chordata
- Class: Aves
- Order: Pelecaniformes
- Family: Pelecanidae
- Genus: Pelecanus
- Species: P. occidentalis

Binomial name
- Pelecanus occidentalis Linnaeus, 1766
- Distribution Nonbreeding Year-round

= Brown pelican =

Species of bird

The brown pelican (Pelecanus occidentalis) is a bird of the pelican family, Pelecanidae, one of three species found in the Americas and one of two that feed by diving into water. It is found on the Atlantic Coast from New Jersey to the mouth of the Amazon River, and along the Pacific Coast from British Columbia to Peru, including the Galapagos Islands. The nominate subspecies in its breeding plumage has a white head with a yellowish wash on the crown. The nape and neck are dark maroon–brown. The upper sides of the neck have white lines along the base of the gular pouch, and the lower fore neck has a pale yellowish patch. The male and female are similar, but the female is slightly smaller. The nonbreeding adult has a white head and neck. The pink skin around the eyes becomes dull and gray in the nonbreeding season. It lacks any red hue, and the pouch is strongly olivaceous ochre-tinged and the legs are olivaceous gray to blackish-gray.

The brown pelican mainly feeds on fish, but occasionally eats amphibians, crustaceans, and the eggs and nestlings of birds. It nests in colonies in secluded areas, often on islands, vegetated land among sand dunes, thickets of shrubs and trees, and mangroves. Females lay two or three oval, chalky white eggs. Incubation takes 28 to 30 days with both sexes sharing duties. The newly hatched chicks are pink, turning gray or black within 4 to 14 days. About 63 days are needed for chicks to fledge. Six to 9 weeks after hatching, the juveniles leave the nest, and gather into small groups known as pods.

The brown pelican is the national bird of Saint Martin, Barbados, Saint Kitts and Nevis, and the Turks and Caicos Islands, and the official state bird of Louisiana, appearing on the flag, seal, or coat of arms of each. It has been rated as a species of least concern by the International Union for Conservation of Nature. It was listed under the United States Endangered Species Act from 1970 to 2009, as pesticides such as dieldrin and DDT threatened its future in the Southeastern United States and California. In 1972, the use of DDT was banned in Florida, followed by the rest of the United States. Since then, the brown pelican's population has increased. In 1903, Theodore Roosevelt set aside the first National Wildlife Refuge, Florida's Pelican Island, to protect the species from hunters.

== Taxonomy ==
The brown pelican was described by Swedish zoologist Carl Linnaeus in the 1766 12th edition of his Systema Naturae, where it was given the binomial name of Pelecanus occidentalis. It belongs to the New World clade of the genus Pelecanus.

The brown pelican is part of a clade that includes the Peruvian pelican (P. thagus) and American white pelican (P. erythrorhynchos); brown and Peruvian pelicans are sister taxa, with American white pelican a more distant relative. The Peruvian pelican was previously considered a subspecies of the brown pelican, but is now considered a separate species on the basis of its much greater size (around double the weight of the brown pelican), differences in bill color and plumage, and a lack of evidence of hybridization between the forms where their ranges approach and overlap. (In captivity, the brown pelican is known to have hybridized with both the American white pelican and the more distantly related great white pelican.)

In 1932, James L. Peters divided Pelecanus into three subgenera, placing brown pelican (including Peruvian pelican) in a monospecific Leptopelicanus, American white pelican in a monospecific Cyrtopelicanus, and all the rest in the subgenus Pelecanus, a treatment which was also followed by Jean Dorst and Raoul J. Mougin in 1979. Andrew Elliott in 1992, and Joseph B. Nelson in 2005, considered the deepest division among pelicans to lie between brown (plus Peruvian) pelican on the one hand, and the white-plumaged pelicans on the other (among which the large ground-nesting American white, Australian, great white, and Dalmatian pelicans were thought to form a clade, and the smaller tree-nesting pink-backed and spot-billed pelicans were likewise considered sister taxa). In 1993, Paul Johnsgard hypothesized that the Americas were colonized relatively late in pelican evolution, with the family originating in Africa or South Asia; however, he later supported the prevailing view that brown (with Peruvian) was the most divergent pelican (and considered American white and great white pelicans to be close relatives, implying two independent dispersals of pelicans into the Americas, with that of the ancestor of brown and Peruvian pelicans occurring early on). Sibley and Ahlquist's DNA-DNA hybridization studies and UPGMA tree published in 1990 supported brown pelican as sister to a clade comprising all the white-plumaged pelicans analyzed, including American white pelican (although the relationships among the latter group differed).

With better genetic data and more modern methods, a new phylogenetic hypothesis of pelican relationships has arisen, which contrasts with the traditional view of brown and Peruvian being the most divergent pelicans based on their distinctive plumage and behavior (and early molecular data). Rather than the brown-plumaged pelicans and white-plumaged pelicans forming two reciprocally monophyletic groups, the American white pelican is sister to brown and Peruvian pelicans, the three together forming an exclusively New World pelican clade. (Among the other pelicans, pink-backed, Dalmatian, and spot-billed pelicans are close relatives, together sister to Australian pelican. Great white pelican has no particularly close relatives; while it may be sister to the previous four, this relationship had low statistical support.)

=== Subspecies ===
Five subspecies of the brown pelican are recognized. At least some of these subspecies are genetically distinct despite similar phenotypes. The subspecies differ from one another in size, coloration of the throat pouch (among other bare parts) in breeding condition, and/or certain breeding plumage details, as well as geographic range.

Image	Subspecies	Distribution
	P. o. californicus (Ridgway, 1884)	This subspecies breeds on the Pacific coast of California and Baja California, and south to Jalisco. Its non-breeding range extends north along the Pacific coast to British Columbia, and south to Guatemala. It is rarely found in El Salvador.
	P. o. carolinensis (Gmelin, 1789)	This subspecies breeds in the eastern United States from Maryland south along the Atlantic, Gulf, and Caribbean coasts and south to Honduras and its Pacific coasts, Costa Rica, and Panama. Its non-breeding range is from southern New York to Venezuela.
	P. o. occidentalis (Linnaeus, 1766)	This subspecies breeds in the Greater and Lesser Antilles, the Bahamas, and along the Caribbean coast of the West Indies, Colombia, and Venezuela, up to Trinidad and Tobago.
	P. o. murphyi (Wetmore, 1945)	This subspecies is found from western Colombia to Ecuador, and is a non-breeding visitor to northern Peru.
	P. o. urinator (Wetmore, 1945)	This subspecies is found on the Galapagos Islands.

== Description ==
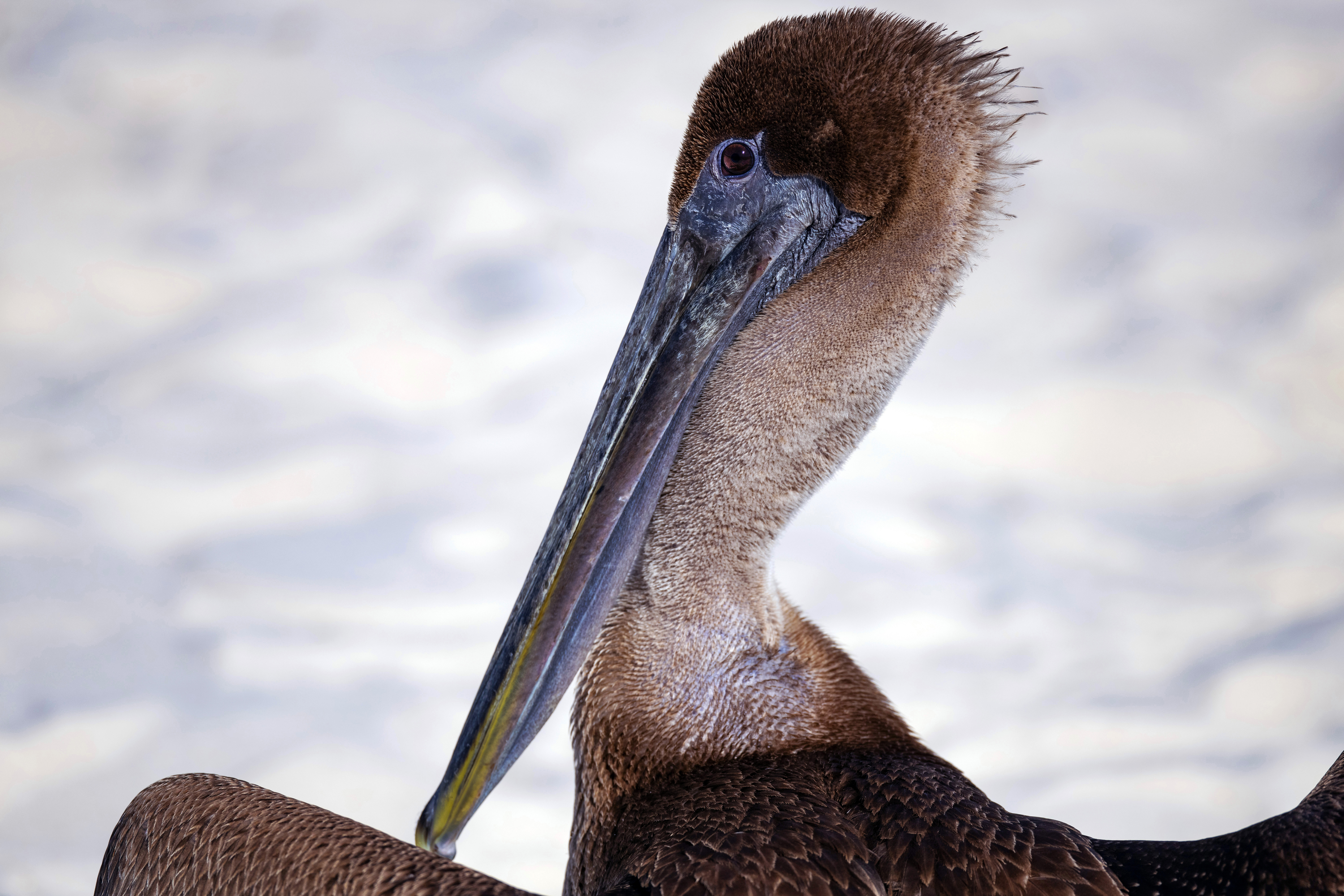
Brown pelican

The brown pelican is the smallest of the eight extant pelican species, but is often one of the larger seabirds in their range nonetheless. It measures 1 to 1.52 m (3 ft 3 in to 5 ft 0 in) in length and has a wingspan of 2.03 to 2.28 m (6 ft 8 in to 7 ft 6 in). The weight of adults can range from 2 to 5 kg (4.4 to 11.0 lb), about half the weight of the other pelicans found in the Americas, the Peruvian and American white pelicans. The average weight in Florida of 47 females was 3.17 kg (7.0 lb), while that of 56 males was 3.7 kg (8.2 lb). Like all pelicans, it has a very long bill, measuring 280 to 348 mm (11.0 to 13.7 in) in length.

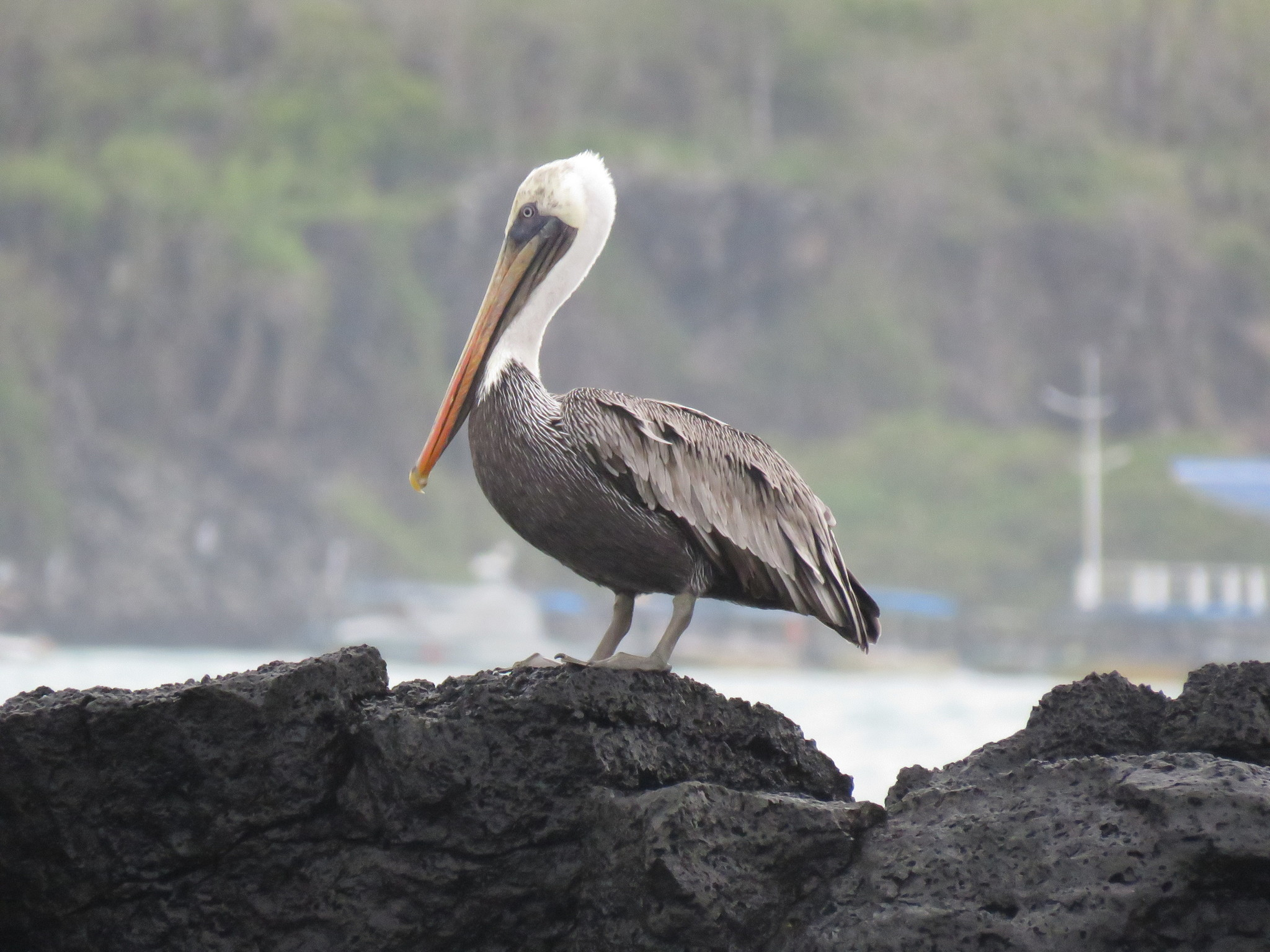
Adult P. o. urinator, in the Galápagos
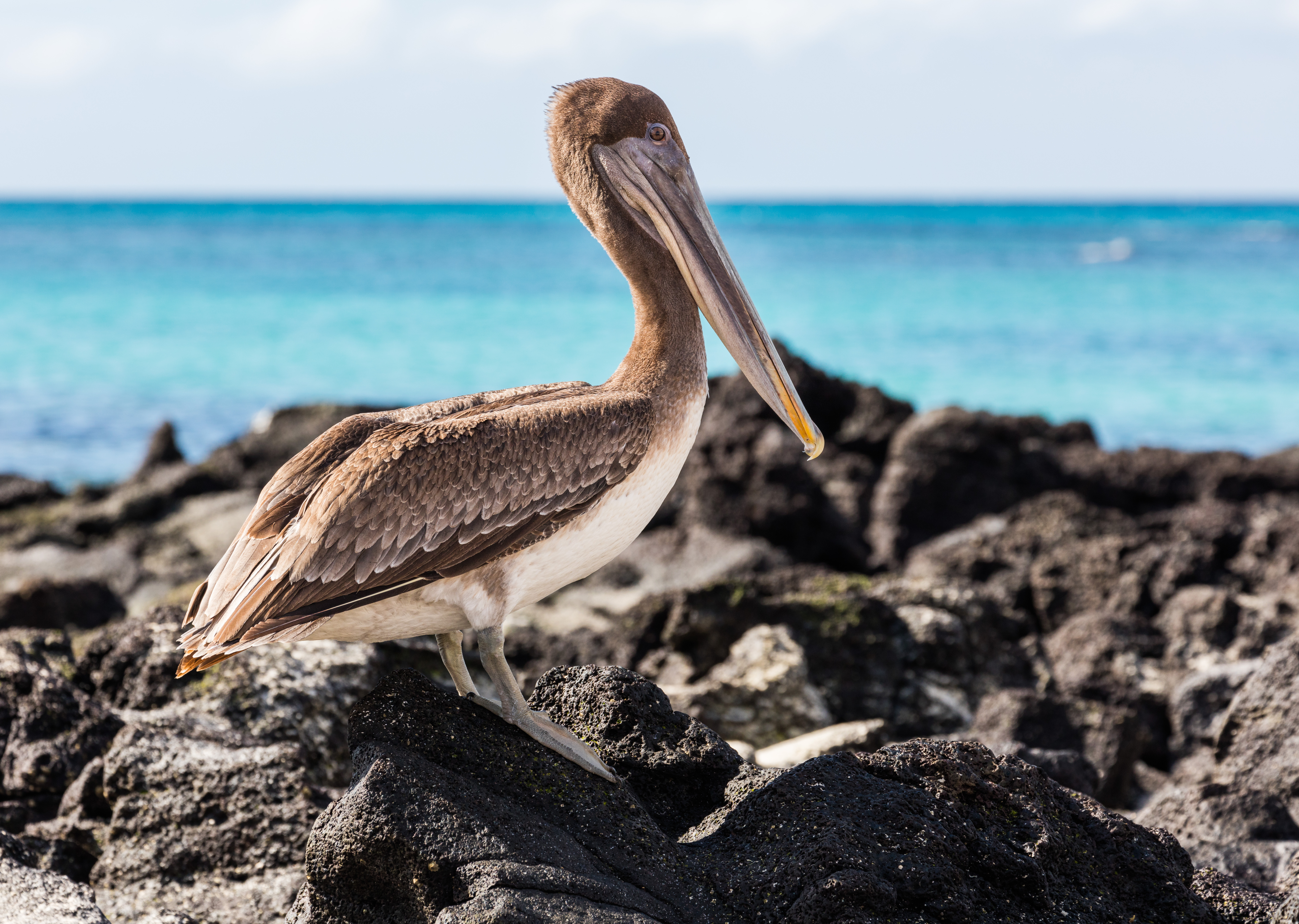
Juvenile P. o. urinator, in the Galápagos

The nominate subspecies in its breeding plumage has a white head with a yellowish wash on the crown. The nape and neck are dark maroon–brown. The upper sides of the neck have white lines along the base of the gular pouch, and the lower foreneck has a pale yellowish patch. The feathers at the center of the nape are elongated, forming short, deep chestnut crest feathers. It has a silvery gray mantle, scapulars, and upperwing coverts (feathers on the upper side of the wings), with a brownish tinge. The lesser coverts have dark bases, which gives the leading edge of the wing a streaky appearance. The uppertail coverts (feathers above the tail) are silvery white at the center, forming pale streaks. The median (between the greater and the lesser coverts), primary (connected to the distal forelimb), secondary (connected to the ulna), and greater coverts (feathers of the outermost, largest, row of upperwing coverts) are blackish, with the primaries having white shafts and the secondaries having variable silver-gray fringes. The tertials (feathers arising in the brachial region) are silver-gray with a brownish tinge. The underwing has grayish-brown remiges with white shafts to the outer primary feathers. The axillaries and covert feathers are dark, with a broad, silver–gray central area. The tail is dark gray with a variable silvery cast. The lower mandible is blackish, with a greenish-black gular pouch at the bottom for draining water when it scoops out prey. The breast and belly are dark, and the legs and feet black. It has a grayish white bill tinged with brown and intermixed with pale carmine spots. The crest is short and pale reddish-brown in color. The back, rump, and tail are streaked with gray and dark brown, sometimes with a rusty hue. The male and female are similar, but the female is slightly smaller. It is exceptionally buoyant due to the internal air sacks beneath its skin and in its bones. It is as graceful in the air as it is clumsy on land.

The nonbreeding adult has a white head and neck, and the pre-breeding adult has a creamy yellow head. The pink skin around the eyes becomes dull and gray in the non-breeding season. It lacks any red hue, and the pouch is strongly olivaceous ochre tinged and the legs are olivaceous gray to blackish-gray. It has pale blue to yellowish white irides which become brown during the breeding season. During courtship, the bill becomes pinkish red to pale orange, redder at the tip, and the pouch is blackish. Later in the breeding season the bill becomes pale ash-gray over most of the upper jaw and the basal third of the mandible.

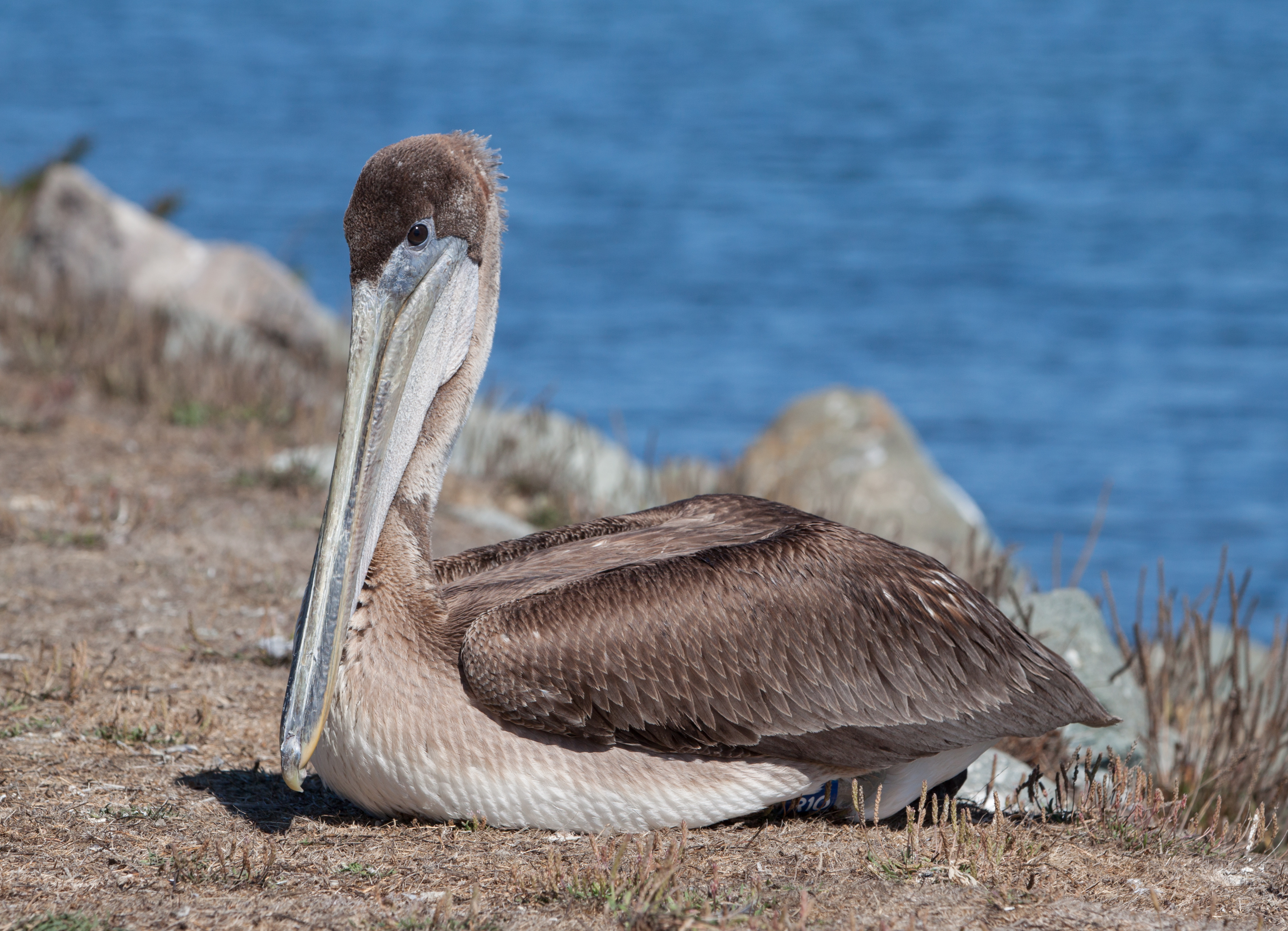
Juvenile at Bodega Harbor, California, United States

The juvenile is similar, but is grayish-brown overall and has paler underparts. The head, neck, and thighs are dusky-brown, and the abdomen is dull white. The plumage of the male is similar to a fully adult female, although the male's head feathers are rather rigid. The tail and flight feathers are browner than those of the adult. It has short, brown upperwing coverts, which are often darker on greater coverts, and dull brownish-gray underwing coverts with a whitish band at the center. The irides are dark brown and the facial skin is bluish. It has a gray bill which is horn-yellow to orange near the tip, with a dark gray to pinkish-gray pouch. It acquires adult plumage at over 3 years of age, when the feathers on the neck become paler, the upperparts become striped, the greater upperwing and median coverts become grayer, and the belly acquires dark spots.

The brown pelican is readily distinguished from the American white pelican by its nonwhite plumage, smaller size, and habit of diving for fish from the air, as opposed to co-operative fishing from the surface. It and the Peruvian pelican are the only true marine pelican species.

The brown pelican produces a wide variety of harsh, grunting sounds, such as a low-pitched hrrraa-hrra, during displays. The adult also rarely emits a low croak, while young frequently squeal.

== Distribution and habitat ==
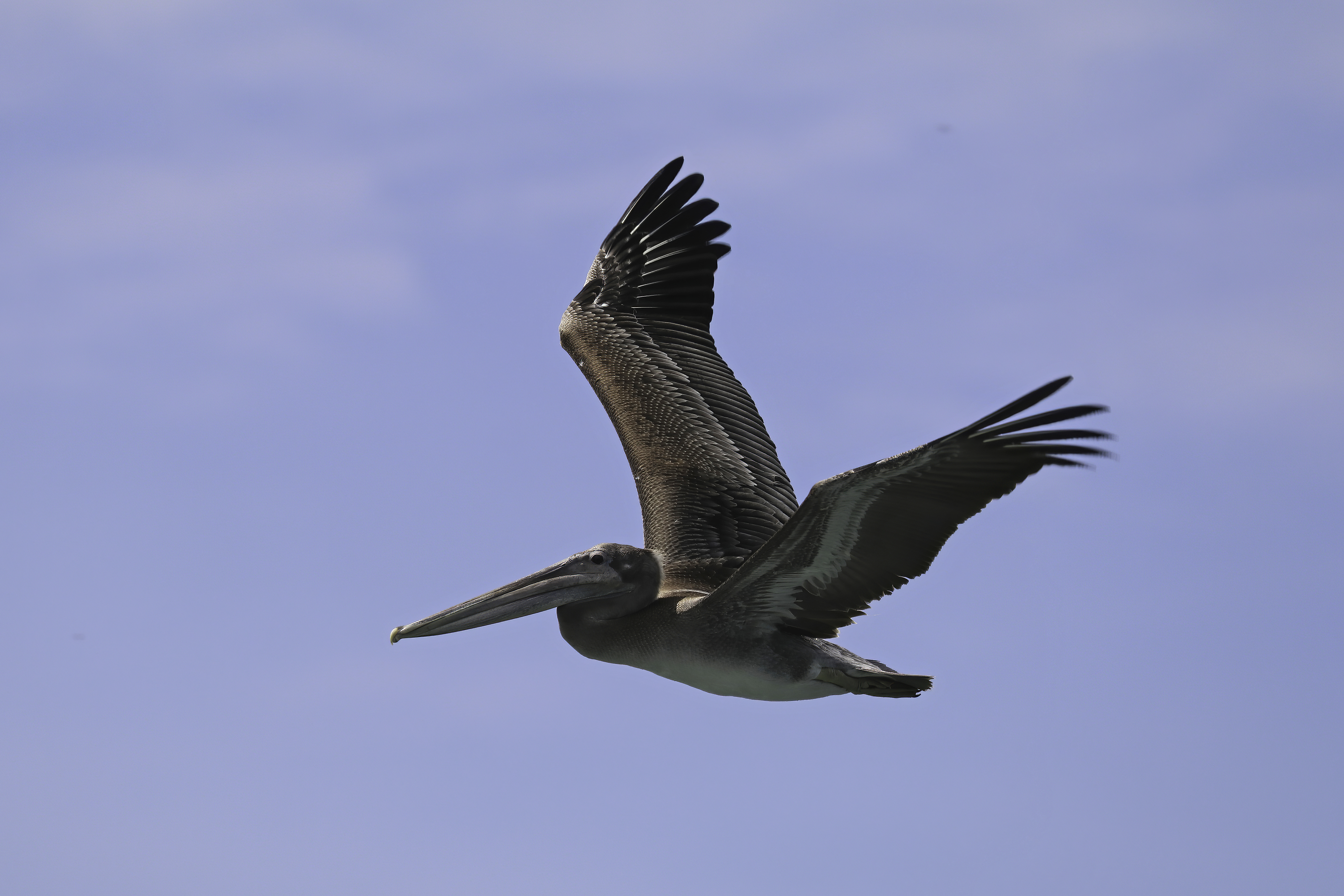
immature P. o. carolinensis, Panama

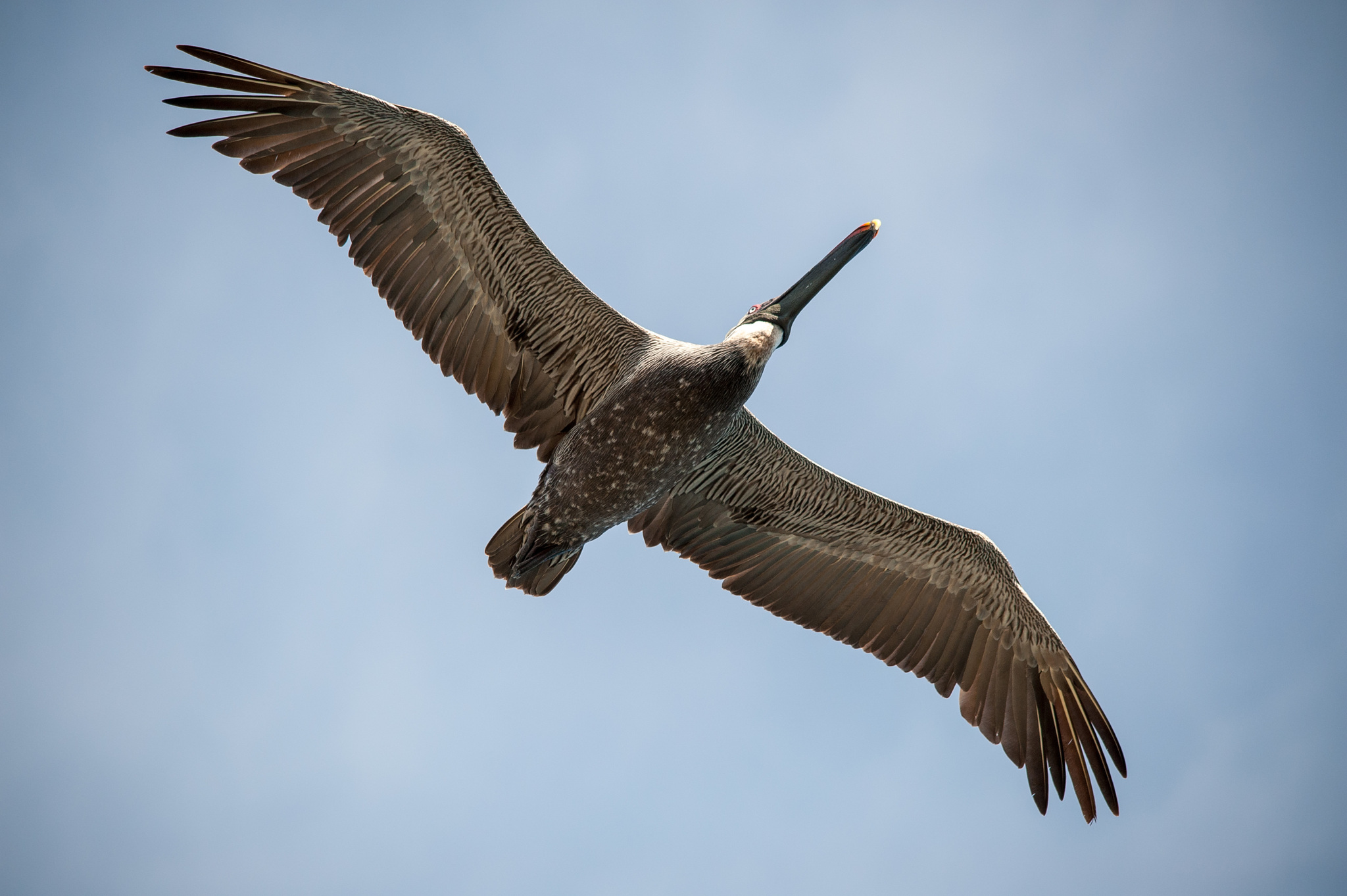
Ventral view of adult P. o. urinator in flight, in the Galápagos

The brown pelican lives on the Atlantic, Gulf, and Pacific Coasts in the Americas. On the Atlantic Coast, it is found from the New Jersey coast to the mouth of the Amazon River. Along the Pacific Coast, it is found from British Columbia to northern Peru, including the Galapagos Islands. After nesting, North American birds move in flocks further north along the coasts, returning to warmer waters for winter. In the non-breeding season, it is found as far north as Canada. It is a rare and irregular visitor south of Piura in Peru, where generally it is replaced by the Peruvian pelican, and can occur as a non-breeding visitor south at least to Ica during El Niño years. Small numbers of brown pelicans have been recorded from Arica in far northern Chile. It is fairly common along the coast of California, South Carolina, North Carolina, Georgia, the West Indies, and many Caribbean islands as far south as Guyana. Along the Gulf Coast, it inhabits Alabama, Texas, Florida, Mississippi, Louisiana, and Mexico.

The brown pelican is a strictly marine species, primarily inhabiting marine subtidal, warm estuarine, and marine pelagic waters. It is also found in mangrove swamps, and prefers shallow waters, especially near salty bays and beaches. It avoids the open sea, seldom venturing more than 20 miles from the coast. Some immature birds may stray to inland freshwater lakes. Its range may also overlap with the Peruvian pelican in some areas along the Pacific coast of South America. It roosts on rocks, water, rocky cliffs, piers, jetties, sand beaches, and mudflats.

=== Migration ===
Most brown pelican populations are resident (nonmigratory) and dispersive (species moving from its birth site to its breeding site, or its breeding site to another breeding site). Some migration is observed, especially in the northern parts of the species's range, but these movements are often erratic, depending on local conditions.

While usually restricted to coastal regions, brown pelicans occasionally wander inland, and there are records of vagrant individuals across much of the interior of North America. The species also occasionally wanders along the coasts of the Americas outside its normal range, with vagrants reported as far north as Southeast Alaska and Newfoundland, as far south as central Chile (well into the range of the closely related Peruvian pelican), and as far east in South America as Alagoas. Rare inland vagrants, generally caused by hurricanes or El Niño phenomena, have been reported from the Colombian Andes. They were first recorded in July 2009 in the Interandean Valley, where they remained for at least 161 days. There are four records far inland in Amazônia Legal, along the Amazon River and its tributaries.

== Behavior ==
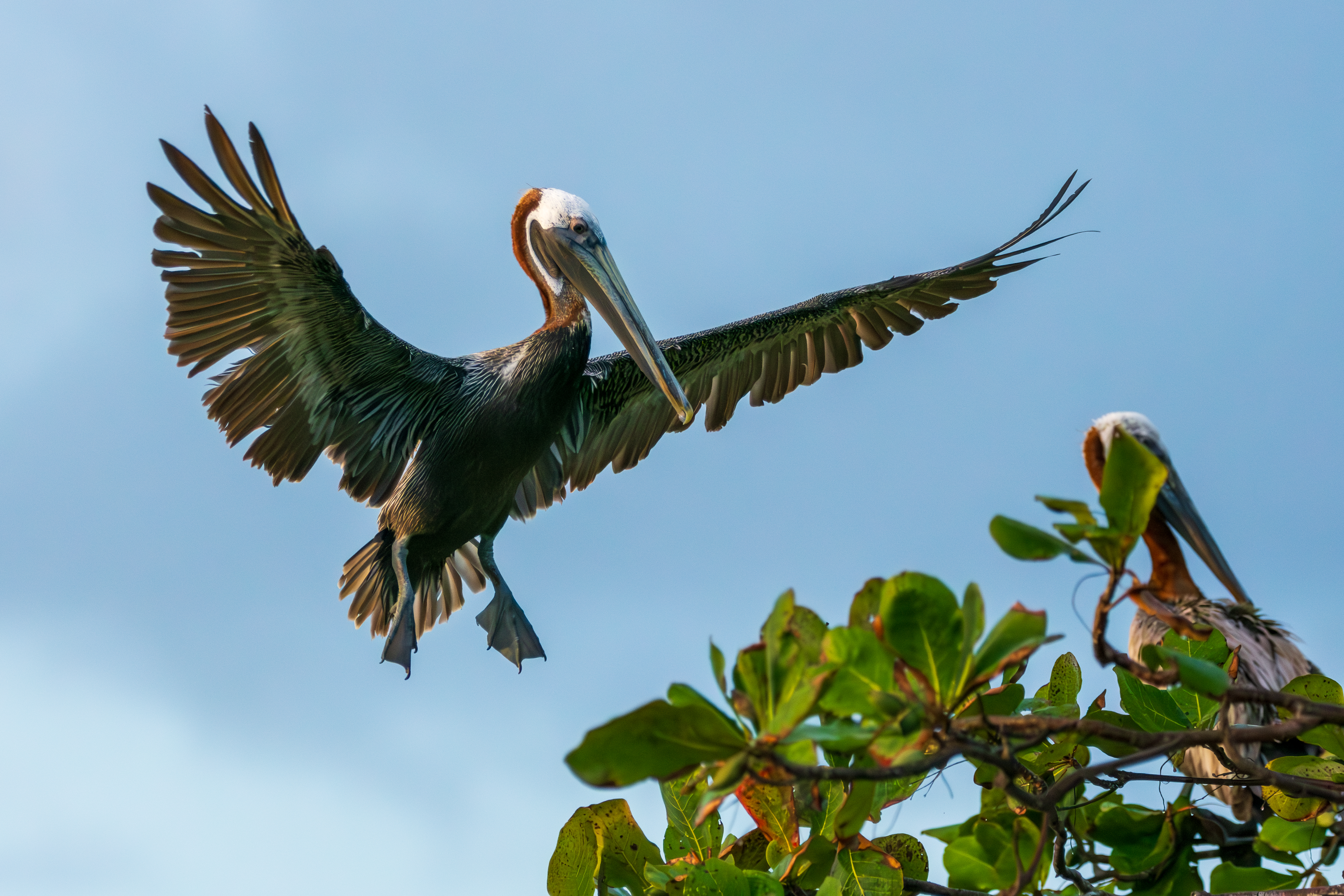
Pelicans perching and socializing on Coccoloba uvifera in Rincon, PR

The brown pelican is a very gregarious bird; it lives in flocks of both sexes throughout the year. In level flight, brown pelicans fly in groups, with their heads held back on their shoulders and their bills resting on their folded necks. They may fly in a V formation, but usually in regular lines or single file, often low over the water's surface. To exclude water from the nasal passage, they have narrower internal regions of the nostrils.

=== Feeding ===
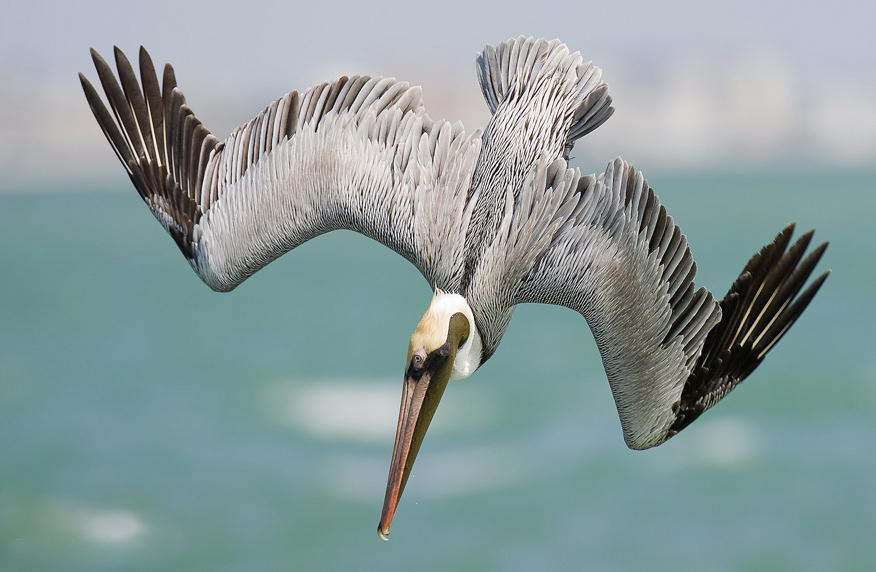
Diving

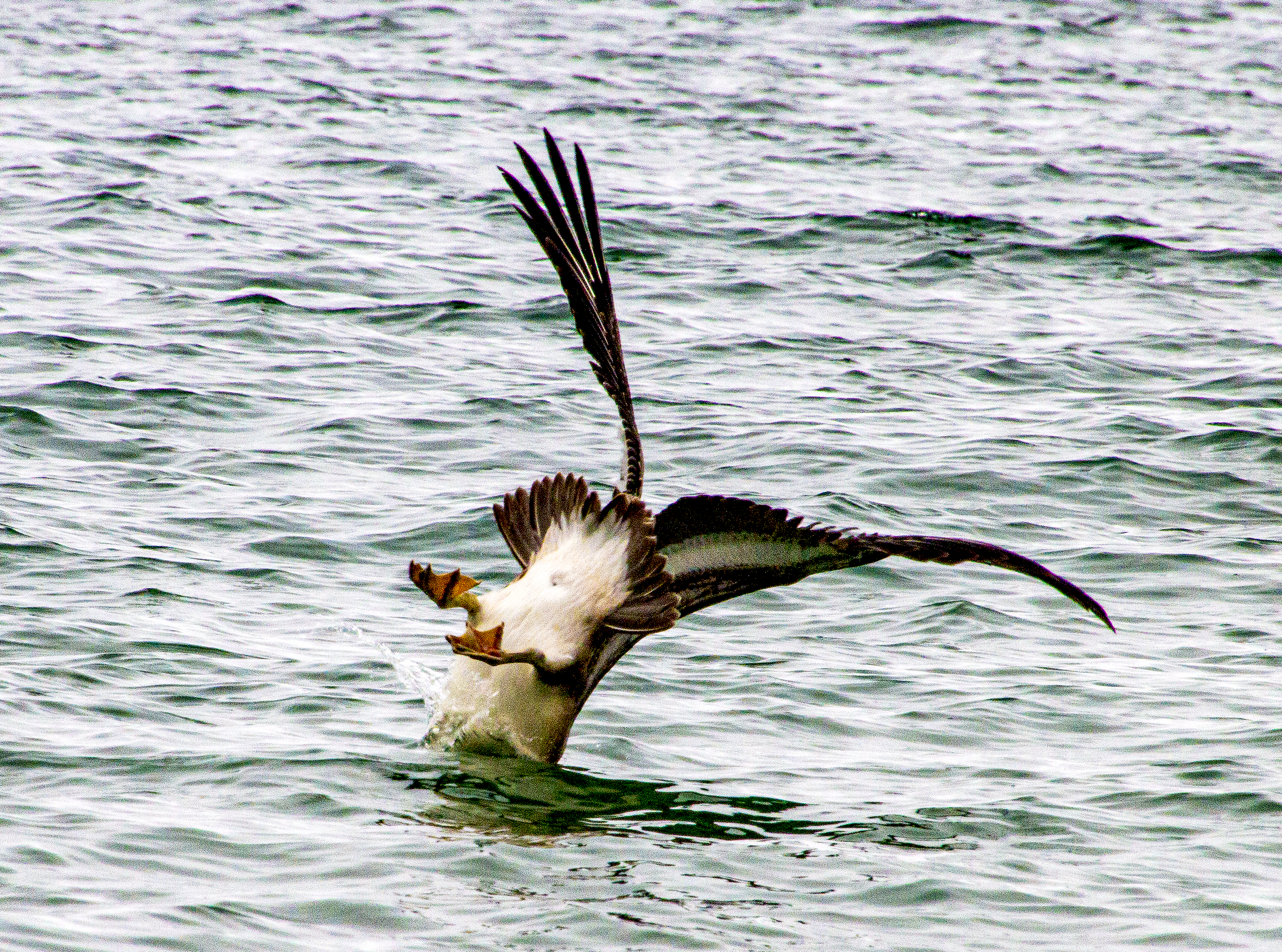
California brown pelican half-submerged after a dive

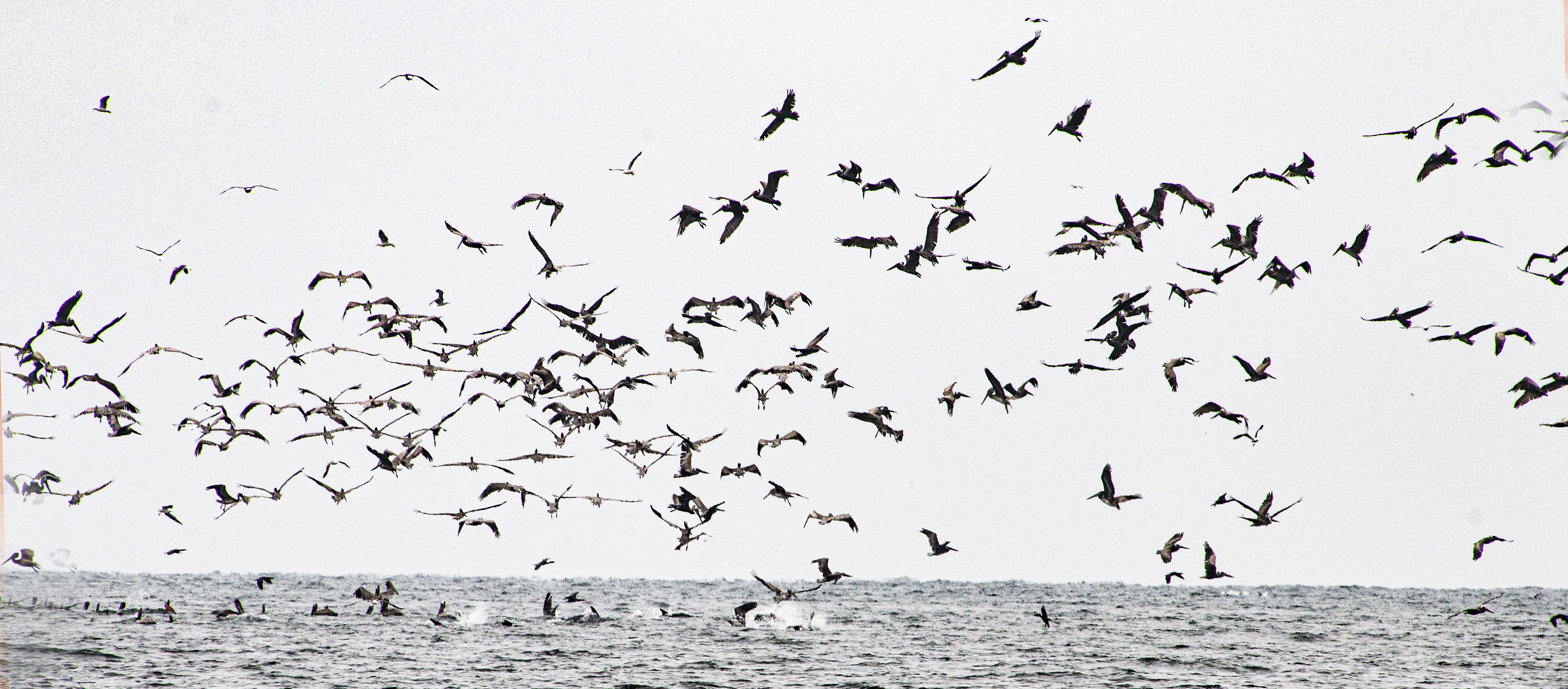
Flock of California brown pelicans feeding in waters off San Diego, California

The brown pelican is a piscivore, primarily feeding on fish. Menhaden may account for 90% of its diet, and the anchovy supply is particularly important to the brown pelican's nesting success. Other fish preyed on with some regularity includes pigfish, pinfish, herring, sheepshead, silversides, mullets, sardines, minnows, and topminnows. Brown pelicans residing in Southern California rely especially heavily on pacific sardine as a major food source which can compose up to 26% of their diet, making them one of the top three predators of sardines in the area. Non-fish prey includes crustaceans, especially prawns, and it occasionally feeds on amphibians and the eggs and nestlings of birds (egrets, common murres and its own species).

As the brown pelican flies at a maximum height of 18 to 21 m (60 to 70 ft) above the ocean, it can spot schools of fish while flying. When foraging, it dives bill-first like a kingfisher, often submerging completely below the surface momentarily as it snaps up prey. Besides its sister species, the Peruvian pelican, this is the only pelican to primarily forage via diving, all other extant pelican merely float on the waters' surface when foraging. Upon surfacing, it spills the water from its throat pouch before swallowing its catch. Only the Peruvian pelican shares this active foraging style (although that species never dives from such a great height), while other pelicans forage more inactively by scooping up corralled fish while swimming on the water surface. It is an occasional target of kleptoparasitism by other fish-eating birds such as gulls, skuas, and frigatebirds. They are capable of drinking saline water due to the high capacity of their salt glands to excrete salt.

=== Breeding ===
The brown pelican is a monogamous breeder within a breeding season, but does not pair for life. Nesting season peaks during March and April. The male chooses a nesting site and performs a display of head movements to attract a female. At the proposed nest site, major courtship displays such as head swaying, bowing, turning, and upright (standing on its legs without any support) are performed by both the sexes. They may also be accompanied by low raaa calls.

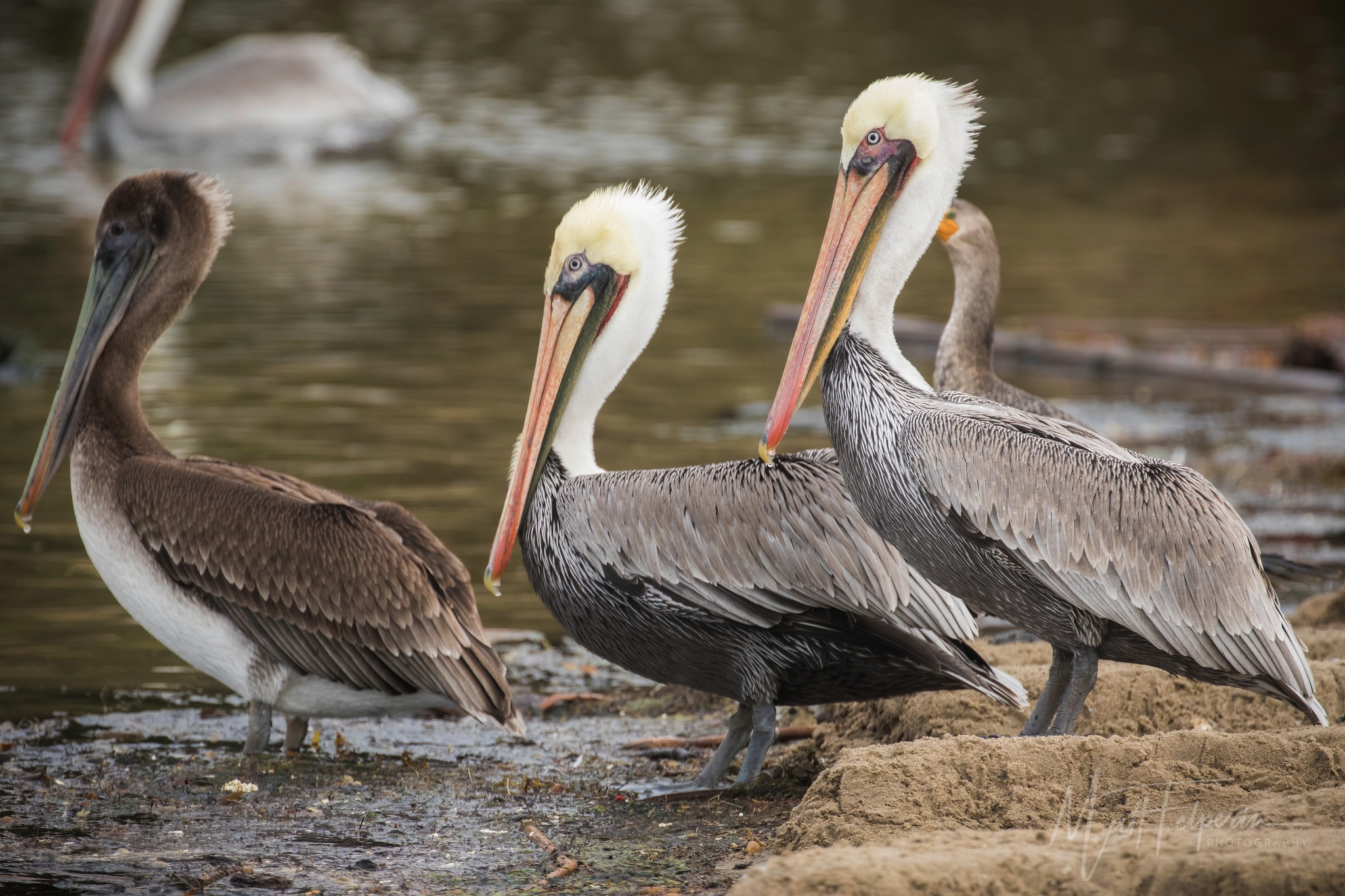
Adults with a juvenile, in Malibu, California

Once a pair forms a bond, overt communication between them is minimal. It is a colonial species, with some colonies maintained for many years. Probably owing to disturbance, tick infestation, or alteration in food supply, colonies frequently shift. It nests in secluded area, often on islands, vegetated spots among sand dunes, thickets of shrubs and trees, and in mangroves, although sometimes on cliffs, and less often in bushes or small trees. Nesting territories are clumped, as individual territories may be at a distance of just 1 m (3.3 ft) from each other. They are usually built by the female from reeds, leaves, pebbles, and sticks, and consist of feather-lined impressions protected with a 10 to 25 cm (3.9 to 9.8 in) rim of soil and debris. They are usually found 0.9 to 3 m (3 to 10 ft) above the ground. Renesting may occur if eggs are lost from the nest early in the breeding season.

There are usually two to three, or sometimes even four, oval eggs in a clutch, and only one brood is raised per year. The egg is chalky white, and can measure about 76 mm (3.0 in) in length and 51 mm (2.0 in) in width. Incubation takes 28 to 30 days with both sexes sharing duties, keeping the eggs warm by holding them on or under their webbed feet. It takes 28 to 30 days for the eggs to hatch, and about 63 days to fledge. After that, the juvenile leave the nest and gather into small groups known as pods. The newly hatched chicks are pink and weigh about 60 g (0.13 lb). Within 4 to 14 days, they turn gray or black. After that, they develop a coat of white, black or grayish down. Fledging success may be as high as 100% for the first hatched chick, 60% for the second chick, and just 6% for the third chick.

The parents regurgitate predigested food for the young to feed upon until they reach their fledging stage. After about 35 days, the young venture out of the nest by walking. The young start flying about 71 to 88 days after hatching. The adults remain with them until some time afterwards and continue to feed them. In the 8- to 10-month period during which they are cared for, the nestling pelicans are fed by regurgitated, partially digested food of around 70 kg (150 lb) of fish. The young reach sexual maturity (and full adult plumage) at anywhere from three to five years of age. A brown pelican has been recorded to have lived for over 31 years in captivity.

Former dredge-spoil islands along the Cape Fear River in North Carolina have been documented by the United States Army Corps of Engineers as nesting habitat for brown pelicans, representing some of the only remaining nesting sites for seabirds in the southeastern North Carolina coastal region.

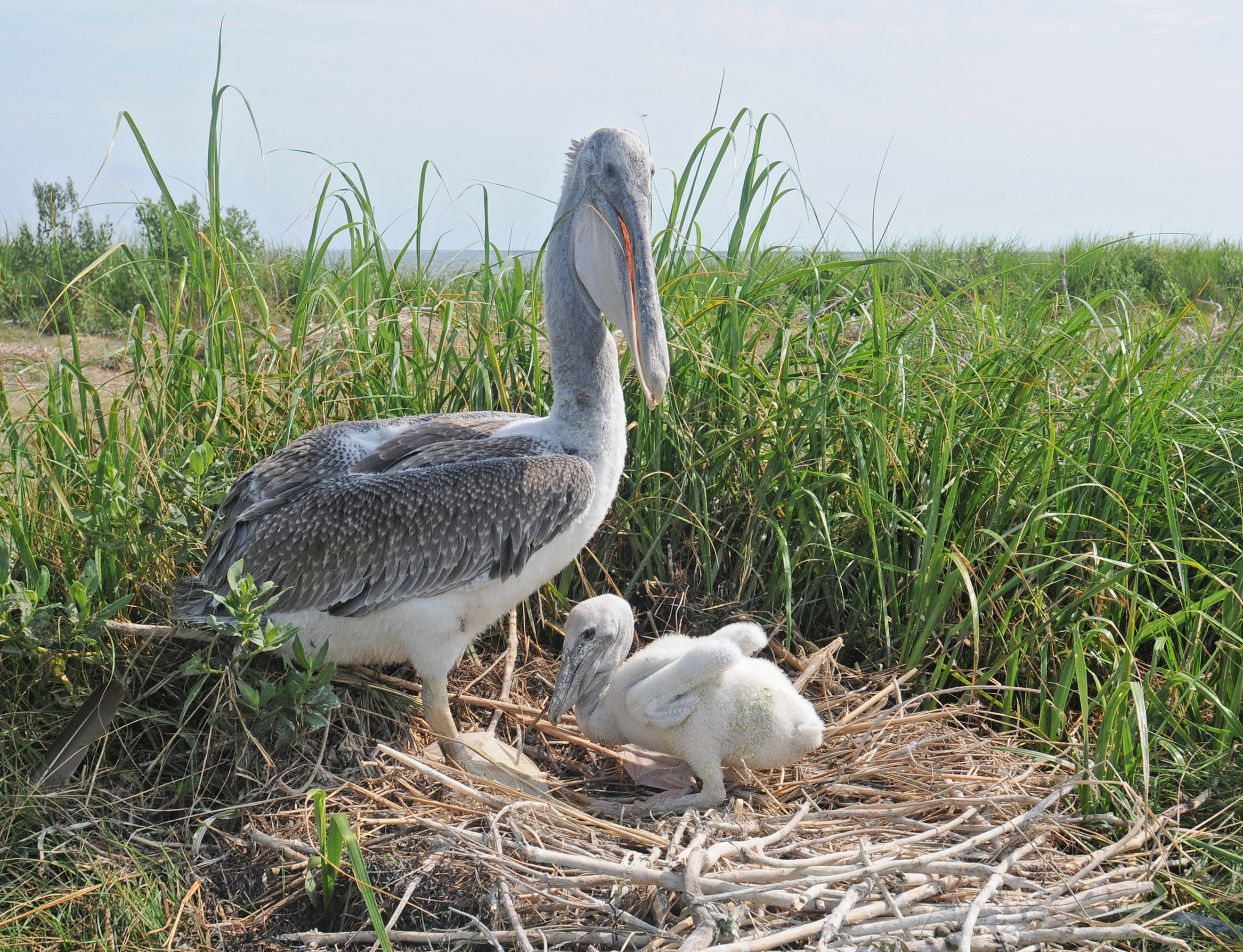
Adult with a chick on a nest on Smith Island, Chesapeake Bay, Maryland, USA

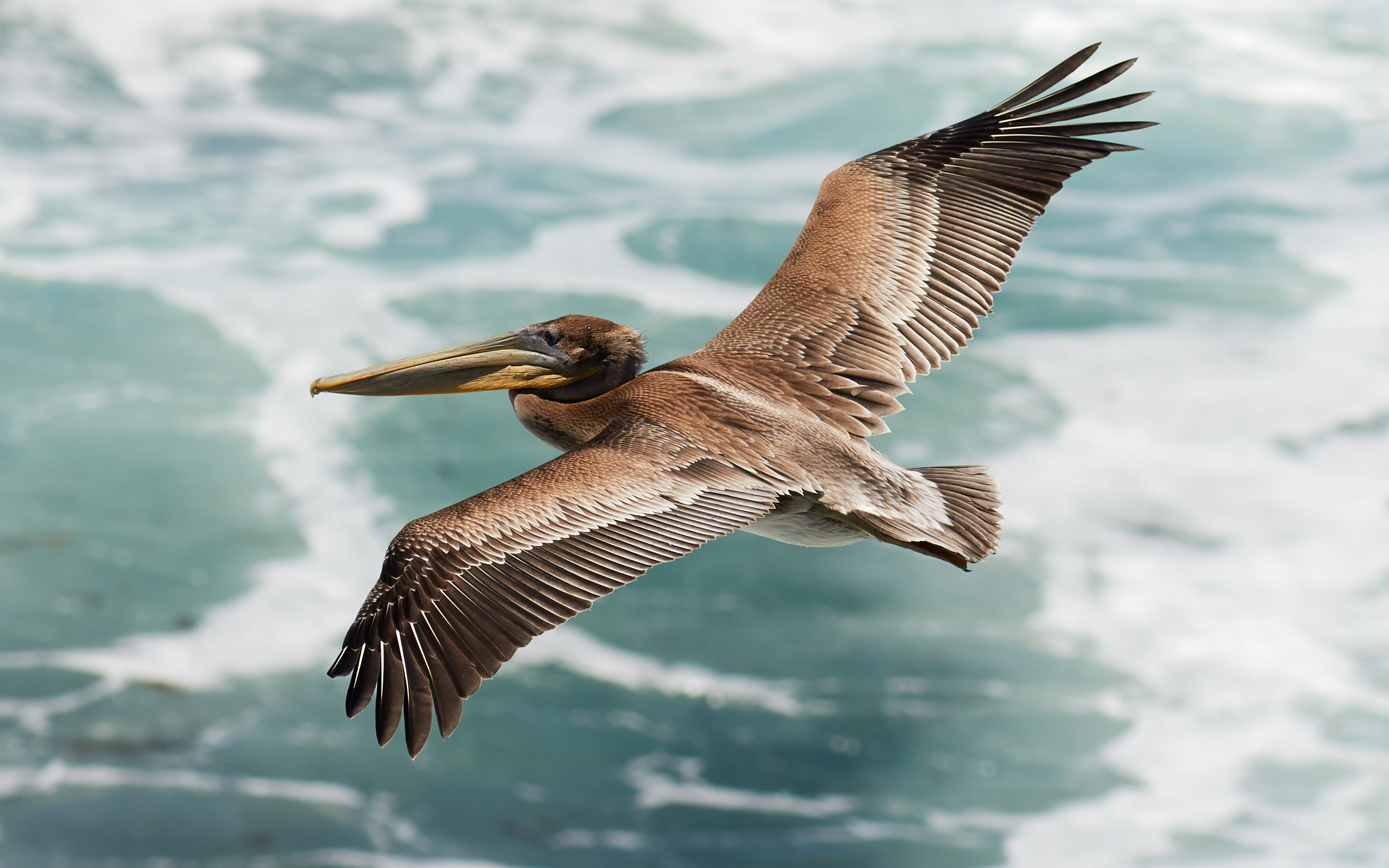
Juvenile in flight, Bodega Head, California

=== Predators and parasites ===
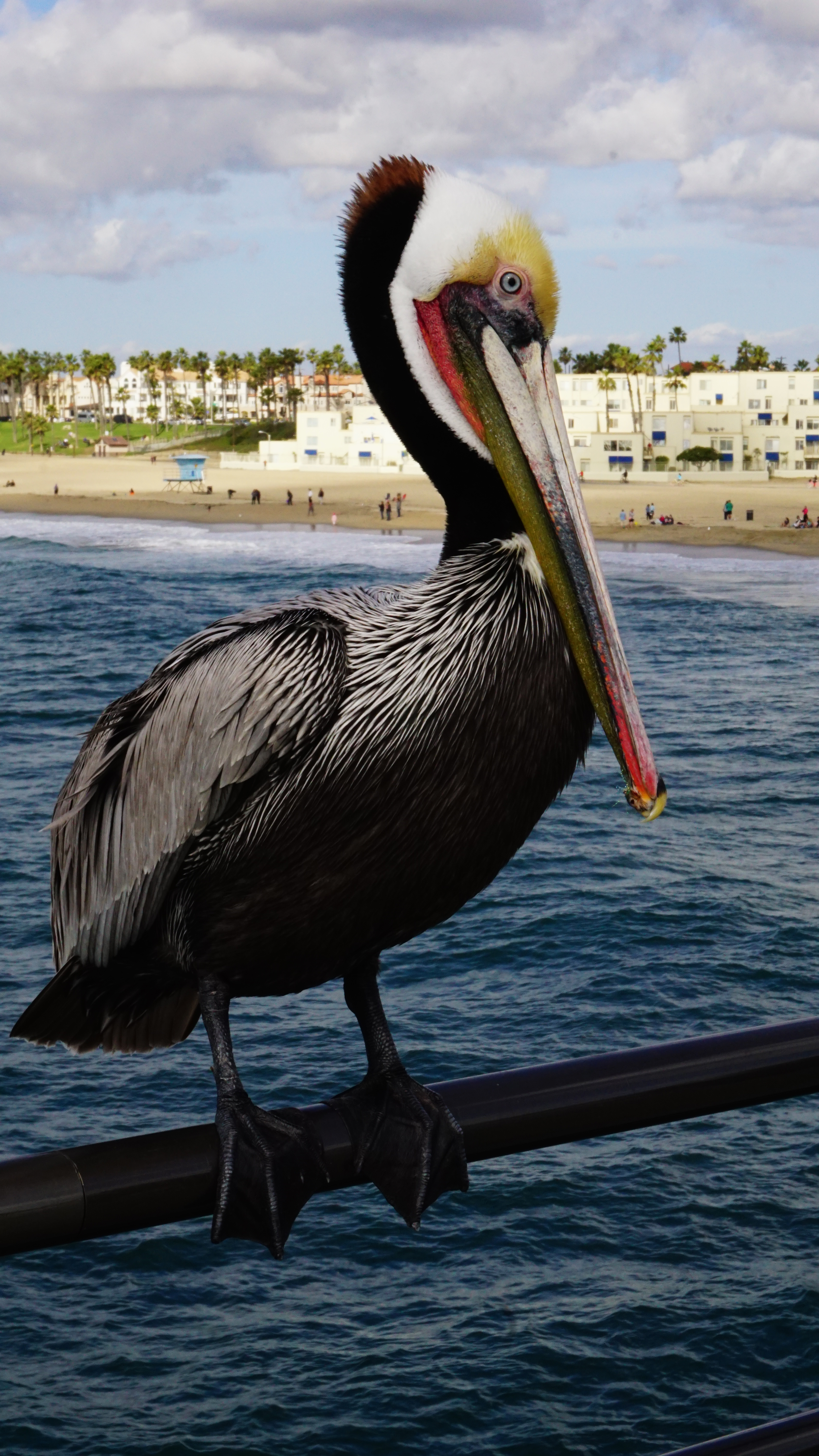
At Huntington Beach, CA pier.

Predation is occasional at colonies, and predators of eggs and young (usually small nestlings are threatened but also occasionally up to fledgling size depending on the size of the predator) can include gulls, raptors (especially bald eagles), spiny-tailed iguanas, alligators, vultures, feral cats, feral dogs, raccoons, fish crows, and corvids. Predation is likely reduced if the colony is on an island. Although it is rare, bobcats have been documented eating both the offspring and injured adults. Predation on adult brown pelicans is rarely reported, but cases where they have fallen prey to bald eagles have been reported. Also, South American sea lions and unidentified large sharks have been observed to prey on adult brown pelicans by seizing them from beneath while the birds are sitting on ocean waters. In California, adult brown pelicans have become a common prey item for North American river otters.

The invasive red imported fire ant is known to prey on hatchlings. Like all pelicans, brown pelicans are highly sensitive to disturbances by humans (including tourists or fishermen) at their nests, and may even abandon their nests. Due to their size, non-nesting adults are rarely predated. Brown pelicans have several parasitic worms such as Petagiger, Echinochasmus, Phagicola longus, Mesostephanus appendiculatoides, Contracaecum multipapillatum, and Contracaecum bioccai, from its prey diet of black mullets, white mullets, and other fish species.

In Florida, brown pelicans may be eaten by some growth stage of invasive snakes like Burmese pythons, reticulated pythons, Southern African rock pythons, Central African rock pythons, boa constrictors, yellow anacondas, Bolivian anacondas, dark-spotted anacondas, and green anacondas.

== Relationship with humans ==
The brown pelican is now a staple of crowded coastal regions and is at some risk by fishermen (monofilament fishing line and hooks) and boaters. In the early twentieth century, hunting was a major cause of its death, and people still hunt adults for their feathers and collect eggs on the Caribbean coasts, in Latin America, and occasionally in the United States, even though it is protected under the Migratory Bird Treaty Act of 1918.

=== Depictions in culture ===
Flag of Louisiana prominently displaying the brown pelican

The brown pelican appears atop the coat of arms of Sint Maarten

The brown pelican is the national bird of Saint Martin, Barbados, Saint Kitts and Nevis, and the Turks and Caicos Islands. In 1902, it was made a part of the official Louisiana seal and, in 1912, a pelican and her young became part of the Flag of Louisiana as well. One of Louisiana's state nicknames is "The Pelican State", and the brown pelican is the official state bird of Louisiana. It is one of the mascots of Tulane University, present on its seal, and is also present on the crest of the University of the West Indies. The National Basketball Association (NBA)'s New Orleans Pelicans are named in the honor of the brown pelican.

In the 1993 film The Pelican Brief, based on the novel of the same name by John Grisham, a legal brief speculates that the assassins of two supreme court justices were motivated by a desire to drill for oil on a Louisiana marshland that was a habitat of the endangered brown pelican. In the same year, Jurassic Park showed a pod of brown pelicans at the end of the film. In the 2003 Disney/Pixar film Finding Nemo, a brown pelican (voiced by Geoffrey Rush in an Australian accent) was illustrated as a friendly, virtuous talking character named Nigel. (Note: The film is set in Australia, although the Australian pelican is the only pelican known to occur in that country.)

=== Status and conservation ===
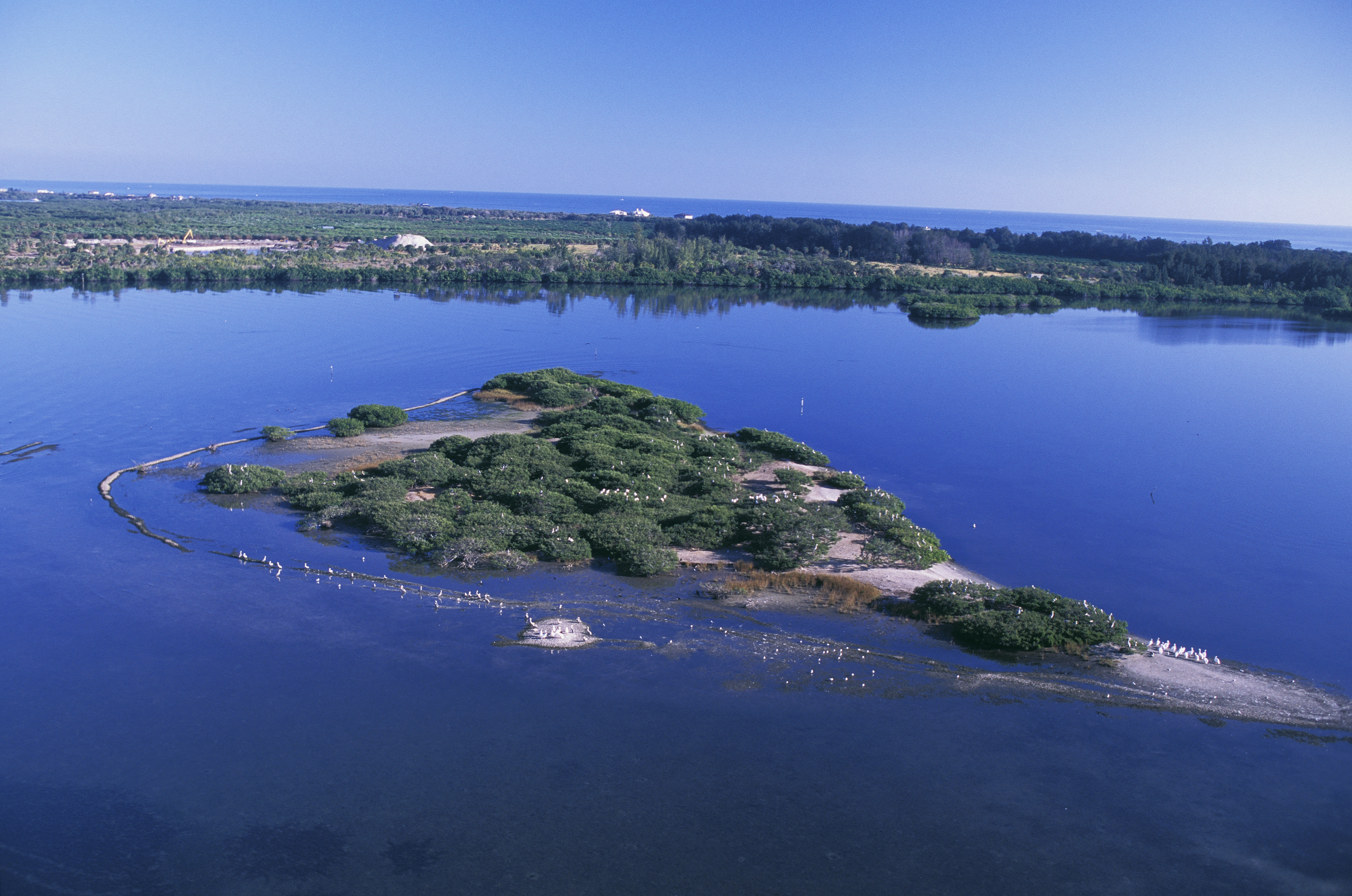
Aerial view of the Pelican Island National Wildlife Refuge

Since 1988, the brown pelican has been rated as least concern on the IUCN Red List of Endangered species based on its large range—greater than 20,000 km^{2} (7700 mi^{2})—and an increasing population trend. The population size is also well beyond the threshold for vulnerable species. The nominate race population is thought to number at least 290,000 in the West Indies, and 650,000 globally. In 1903, Theodore Roosevelt set aside Pelican Island, now known as Pelican Island National Wildlife Refuge, to solely protect the brown pelican from hunters.

Starting in the 1940s with the invention and extensive use of pesticides such as DDT, the brown pelican population had drastically declined due to a lack of breeding success. By the 1960s, it had almost disappeared along the Gulf Coast and, in southern California, it had suffered almost total reproductive failure, due to DDT usage in the United States. The brown pelican was listed under the United States Endangered Species Act from 1970 to 2009. A research group from the University of Tampa, headed by Ralph Schreiber, conducted research in Tampa Bay, and found that DDT caused the pelican eggshells to be too thin to support the embryo to maturity. In 1972, the United States Environmental Protection Agency (USEPA) banned DDT usage in the United States and limited the use of other pesticides. There has been a decline in chemical contaminant levels in brown pelican eggs since then, and a corresponding increase in its nesting success. It became extinct in 1963 in Louisiana. Between 1968 and 1980, the Louisiana Department of Wildlife and Fisheries' reintroduction program re-established the brown pelican, and its population numbers in California and Texas were restored due to improved reproduction and natural recolonization of the species. By 1985, its population in the eastern United States, including Florida, Georgia, South Carolina, Alabama, and northward along the Atlantic Coast, had recovered and the species was removed from the Endangered Species List. Its population has grown by about 68% per decade over a period of 40 years in North America, and this trend appears to be continuing. It is still listed as endangered in the Pacific Coast region of its range and in the southern and central United States. Although the United States Gulf Coast populations in Louisiana and Texas are still listed as endangered, they were recently estimated in 2009 about 12,000 breeding pairs. Since that time the Deepwater Horizon oil spill has adversely affected populations, and current population figures are not available.

==== Indicator species ====
The brown pelican abundance has steadily recovered from the drastic population decreases in the 1940s, however bottom up control threatens the Southern California populations as food sources become diminished. It is common for forage fish populations to experience regular fluctuations, however there has been a consistent decrease in the Pacific sardine population beginning as early as 2014. In 2019 these declines were found to have reached levels which were a mere 10% of the highest reported abundances. Fluctuations in sardine populations have largely been attributed to bottom-up control, primarily including climate variability and ocean temperature. The significant decrease in pacific sardine population can be linked to the levels of nitrogen within their habitat, a limiting factor in plankton production. Pacific sardines in the California current system rely on wind driven upwelling to push cooler, nitrogen rich waters towards the surface, maintaining a sustainable, nutrient abundant environment. Continued environmental disruptions, such as El Niño, rising ocean temperatures, and increased commercial fishing, have drastic effects on nutrient cycling within the California current system, leading to lasting impacts on Pacific sardine productivity and reproductive success.

The brown pelican has been predicted to have high vulnerability to declining sardine populations . At the lowest levels of sardine abundance, the brown pelican population has been predicted to decline up to 50%. Even with a more moderate decline in sardine abundance (50% relative abundance), brown pelicans have been predicted to decrease by up to 27%. A recent decline in brown pelican breeding success coincides with the population decline of the Pacific sardine. Between 2014 and 2016, brown pelicans experienced a continuous breeding failure. These breeding failures have been characterized by decreased numbers of pelicans arriving at nesting colonies, large scale abandonment and early migration due to an inability to feed hatchlings, and sub-optimal breeding by those who do attempt to breed. Breeding success is greatly reduced by oceanic anomalies, specifically warm-phase anomalies that increase the intensity of upwellings. Increased upwellings disrupt marine productivity and forage fish availability. These trends have important implications for the health and conservation of brown pelicans, as well as other seabirds.

Seabirds have become increasingly important as an indicator species. They are often used in order to indirectly track changes in fish stocks, ecosystem health, and climate change. Environmental changes tend to have fast acting impacts on marine bird populations due to the simplicity of their trophic cascade, allowing for complex, long term trends in ecosystem health and resources to be easily realized and tracked. Brown pelicans have proven to be a useful indicator in determining the effects of the well-established fishing industry in Southern California. Sardine fishery in the Gulf of California has been showing signs of overfishing since the early 1990s. Sardine population and abundance, however, is difficult to monitor and obtain indicators for. Since lacking food availability has negative implications for breeding success in seabirds, seabird diet, and breeding success have been used to indirectly measure the population status of the fish they feed on. This model has been shown to work using brown pelicans as an indicator species. As the proportion of sardines in the brown pelican's diet decreases, the success of fisheries declines to a lesser extent. When eventually the sardine abundance has declined enough for brown pelicans to move away and begin feeding on other forage fish, commercial fishing still would be fishing in significant numbers. This indicates that even when fisheries are not seeing signs of declining sardine abundance, brown pelicans may have already been affected to the point of locating other food sources. This availability of sardines may decline even further during El Niño anomalies, when thermoclines prevent brown pelicans from reaching their prey. Brown pelican diet will mostly indicate declines in sardine abundance for fisheries during the same season, as brown pelicans feed mostly on the same adult fish that are commercially fished. Although brown pelicans serve as an important indicator species for fisheries, declining sardine abundance due to both climate changes and overfishing have huge implications on overall ecosystem health, within or outside the individual trophic cascade.
