= Benach =

Benach is a surname. Notable people with the surname include:

- Ernest Benach (born 1959), Catalan Spanish politician
- Jorge Benach, American medical researcher
