= Stephen Malawista =

American medical researcher and professor

Stephen Evan Malawista (April 4, 1934 – September 18, 2013) was an American medical researcher and Professor of medicine within the rheumatology department of Yale University. Malawista is credited as the co-discover of Lyme disease and led the research team which identified the disease.

In 1975, Malawista and his Yale colleague, researcher Dr. Allen Steere, began work which would reveal Lyme disease as a new, distinct illness. Malawista and Steere had been contacted by the Connecticut Department of Public Health, which had been concerned about a mysterious cluster of similar illnesses and symptoms which had begun afflicting patients within the southeastern region of Connecticut. Malawista and Steere identified the illness, as a new bacterial infection spread by the bite of a tick. In 1977, Malawista and Steere identified the illness as a new infection spread by tick bites. Malawista initially named the new disease "Lyme arthritis." The name was later changed to Lyme disease after the illness was later shown to encompass a wide range of symptoms which were not limited to joint pain.

Malawista and his colleagues initially hypothesized that Lyme disease was caused by a virus. However, was later disproved in 1982 by microbiologist Willy Burgdorfer, who correctly identified the Borrelia burgdorferi bacterium as the cause of Lyme disease in Connecticut and the eastern United States. Other scientists later determined that the deer tick was the carrier of the bacterium. Malawista and his colleagues contributed to the research the possible spread of Lyme disease by deer ticks by comparing the incidents of the disease along the eastern and western sides of the Connecticut River.

Another of Malawista's colleagues within the Yale rheumatology department, Dr. Linda Bockenstedt later spoke of his commitment to his research on Lyme disease, telling the Hartford Courant in 2013, "I think he recognized an opportunity when this was unfurling in 1975 that this was something different and unusual...It was this detective work that led to the discoveries that set the stage for the treatment that ultimately worked against it."

== Early life ==
Malawista was born in New York City on April 4, 1934. His mother, Ann Marlowe Straus, was a theatrical producer and the head of the Berkshire Theater Festival. His father, Lawrence Malawista, was a real estate developer.

While attending the Berkshire School, he was accepted to Harvard University when he was just 15 years old. Malawista studied under B.F. Skinner as an undergraduate student. He received a bachelor's degree in experimental psychology from Harvard in 1954. In 1958, he received a medical degree from Columbia University.

In 1994, the American College of Rheumatology awarded Malawista the Distinguished Investigator Award, calling him "one of the most creative investigators of our time." He was also the recipient of a Guggenheim Fellowship in 2001.

Malawista died from metastatic melanoma at his home in Hamden, Connecticut, on September 18, 2013, at the age of 79. He was survived by his wife of 44 years, Tobé Miller Malawista.
