= Allen Steere =

American rheumatologist

- Education: Columbia College of Physicians and Surgeons
- Known for: characterization of Lyme disease
- Scientific career
- Workplaces: Harvard University; Tufts University; Yale University

Allen Caruthers Steere is an American rheumatologist. He is a professor of rheumatology at Harvard University and previously at Tufts University and Yale University. Steere and his mentor, Stephen Malawista of Yale University, are credited with discovering and naming Lyme disease, and he has published almost 300 scholarly articles on Lyme disease during his more than 40 years of studies of this infection. At a ceremony in Hartford, Connecticut in 1998, Governor John G. Rowland declared September 24 to be "Allen C. Steere Day".

== Biography ==
Steere attended medical school at the Columbia College of Physicians and Surgeons, and graduated in 1969. After internship and residency, he spent two years in the Epidemic Intelligence Service of the Centers for Disease Control in Atlanta and was sent around the country to evaluate outbreaks of disease. In 1975, four months after starting his rheumatology fellowship at Yale University, he learned of a cluster of children who were thought to have juvenile rheumatoid arthritis in Lyme, Connecticut. Evaluation of the case clusters suggested that this was a tick-borne illness and a previously undescribed type of arthritis.

From 1977 to 1987, Steere was a faculty member in the Rheumatology Division at Yale University, and from 1988 to 2002, he was chief of the Rheumatology Division at Tufts University Medical Center. Since 2003, he has been a faculty member of the Rheumatology Division at Massachusetts General Hospital and a professor of medicine at Harvard Medical School. Throughout his career, Lyme disease has been a central focus – from description of the disease, to development of diagnostic tests, testing of treatment regimens, defining pathogenic mechanisms, and evaluation of the first vaccine to prevent the infection.

== Lyme disease research ==
In 1975, the Connecticut State Health Department received complaints from Polly Murray, a mother living in the small town of Lyme, Connecticut. Two of her children had been diagnosed with juvenile rheumatoid arthritis, but she knew of others in the area with similar symptoms.

An epidemic intelligence officer assigned to the Connecticut state health department, David R. Snydman contacted Allen Steere who was studying rheumatology at Yale University, after he had performed a preliminary investigation and thought that there was some symptom complex worth investigating. He knew Allen Steere since they were together in Atlanta the year before at the Centers for Disease Control (CDC), when both were in the Epidemic Intelligence Service, a CDC program set up in the 1950s to track epidemics worldwide.

Steere met with Ms. Murray, who gave him a list of children who shared a set of symptoms. Steere called each affected family, representing 39 children in all, and he found an additional twelve adults suffering from what was thought to be juvenile rheumatoid arthritis.

A quarter of the people Steere interviewed remembered getting a strange, spreading skin rash (erythema migrans) before experiencing any other symptoms. A European doctor happened to be visiting Yale at the time, and he pointed out that the rash was similar to one frequently encountered in northern Europe and known to be associated with tick bites. Most of the rashes were found somewhere on the torso, suggesting a crawling vector rather than a flying one or a spider, but most patients did not remember being bitten.

In 1976, Steere began testing blood from disease victims for specific antibodies against 38-known tick-transmitted diseases and 178 other arthropod-transmitted viruses. Not one came out positive. When the broader definition of the disease was applied, more cases were discovered, in Connecticut, adjoining states, and the upper Midwest.

Steere then learned about the work of the Swedish dermatologist Arvid Afzelius, who in 1909 had described an expanding, ring-like lesion and speculated that it was caused by the bite of an Ixodes tick. The rash described by Afzelius was later named erythema migrans. Research in Europe had found that erythema migrans and acrodermatitis chronica atrophicans, another rash caused by ticks in Europe, responded to penicillin, suggesting that the cause was bacterial, not viral. Yet no microorganisms could be found in fluid from the joints of Lyme disease patients.

The recognition that the patients in the United States had erythema migrans led to the recognition that "Lyme arthritis" was one manifestation of the same tick-borne disease known in Europe. The syndrome first found in and around Lyme and Old Lyme, Connecticut came to be called "Lyme arthritis" and later "Lyme disease".

In 1980, Steere and colleagues began to test antibiotic regimens in adult patients with Lyme disease.

Steere first published about neurological and cardiac symptoms involved in his early studies of Lyme disease in 1977. Steere first published work about chronic manifestations of the disease in 1979.

Steere later worked with Frank Dressler; the CDC later adopted their work for its Lyme disease surveillance case definition. Using primarily sera from early, acute Lyme patients, Steere formulated serodiagnostic criteria for Western blotting, a technique which identifies antibodies in the serum directed against foreign antigen, in this case, B. burgdorferi, the causative agent of Lyme disease.

== Lyme disease controversy ==
By the mid-1990s, Steere had watched Lyme disease gain acceptance, but he worried that Lyme disease had become a nonspecific diagnosis covering maladies ranging from chronic fatigue syndrome (CFS), fibromyalgia to hypochondria. Steere was concerned that many people with no evidence of past or present Lyme disease receiving antibiotic treatments, especially treatments beyond the recommended four week treatment guideline protocol, "were being done more harm than good".

Writing in the Journal of the American Medical Association (JAMA) in 1993, Steere and colleagues stated that Lyme disease had become "overdiagnosed" and overtreated. This statement became a rallying point for what advocacy groups call the Lyme disease controversy. In the face of some elements of mainstream medical opinion, some doctors and patient advocacy groups claim that Lyme disease can develop into a chronic disease requiring high doses of antibiotics over long periods of time. However aside from the issue of terminology, some mainstream medical opinion goes as far as to say that some Lyme disease cases can become "difficult to treat" if not quickly diagnosed.

Although the term "chronic Lyme" was once used by Steere and others to define persistent complications following acute Lyme disease, various Lyme advocacy organizations and a dissident group of doctors called the International Lyme and Associated Diseases Society (ILADS) have redefined the term to describe a wide range of symptoms, mostly in patients who have no evidence of Lyme disease. Steere and his colleagues said that even patients with a positive serology for Borrelia infection and with symptoms resembling those of CFS or fibromyalgia, would not be helped by further antibiotics.

Steere's prominence, and his support of the medical view that patients with "chronic Lyme disease" often have no actual evidence of Lyme disease and are not helped by long courses of antibiotics, led to him being targeted, harassed, and threatened with death by patients and advocacy groups angered by his refusal to validate their belief that they suffer from chronic Lyme disease.

== Lyme vaccine ==
As chief of the rheumatology and immunology department at Tufts School of Medicine, Steere led the research effort on Lymerix, the preventive Lyme vaccine by SmithKline Beecham, now GlaxoSmithKline (GSK), which first appeared on the market in January 1999. The research took four years, spanned ten states, and involved 11,000 patients and 31 scientists.

Lymerix works on the outer surface protein A (Osp-A) of Borrelia burgdorferi, the causative agent of Lyme disease. Osp-A causes creation of antibodies from the body's immune system to attack that protein. Tests preceding the vaccine were done primarily on Lyme arthritis, and patients with neurological or cardiac manifestations were excluded.

The vaccine was shown to be 78 percent effective. The drug was taken in three shots administered over the course of a year. Some uncertainty remained about the vaccine's ultimate safety before it was released to the public, especially for people with certain conditions. When the National Vaccine Advisory Committee of the Food and Drug Administration (FDA) certified the drug in December 1998, members appended a list of concerns about the long-term effect of the vaccine. The FDA released the vaccine on public health grounds, recommending that it be considered by people at the highest risk. GSK took the drug off the market in 2002 for commercial reasons, citing poor sales (with predictions of less than 10,000 people to be vaccinated in 2002), the high price of the vaccine, the need to exclude children under 15, and the need for frequent boosters. In 2002, vaccine expert Stanley Plotkin predicted that the withdrawal meant there would never be another Lyme disease vaccine available.

== Current work ==
In recent years, Steere has pioneered studies of the role of infectious agents in triggering autoimmune diseases, particularly in patients with post-infectious, antibiotic-refractory Lyme arthritis or rheumatoid arthritis. The inflammation of the synovial membrane in affected joints, which is the target of an untoward immune response, is similar in both diseases. Using a novel approach of proteomics and translational research, developed with Catherine Costello at Boston University, he and his colleagues have identified four novel autoantigens that are targets of immune responses in patients with post-infectious Lyme arthritis. He has developed an algorithm for the treatment of such patients: after oral and intravenous antibiotic therapy, they are given immunosuppressive medications, such as methotrexate or TNF inhibitors, as in rheumatoid arthritis.

His current studies are funded by the National Institutes of Health to further explore how the Lyme disease agent, Borrelia burgdorferi, induces excessive immune responses in genetically susceptible individuals with post-infectious Lyme arthritis, which can lead to joint pathology similar with that seen in other chronic inflammatory forms of arthritis such as rheumatoid arthritis. ß Among many honors, Steere has received two awards from the National Institutes of Health, one in 1988 for his discovery of Lyme disease and the 1999 Astute Clinician Award "for observation of an unusual clinical occurrence, and by investigating it, opening an important new avenue of research."

Building further on his experience with Lyme arthritis, Steere is now conducting studies of infection-induced autoimmunity in patients with rheumatoid arthritis. With his colleagues Annalisa Pianta and Elise Drouin, he has reported a link between immune responses to a commensal microorganism in the gut microbiome, Prevotella copri, and two novel autoantigens (human proteins) that are highly expressed in joints of rheumatoid arthritis patients. These studies demonstrated molecular mimicry between these microbial and human proteins, and in some cases, Prevotella DNA was found in patients' inflamed joints, suggesting that the organism itself or components of it may sometimes reach the joints of rheumatoid arthritis patients. These findings, which have implications for the diagnosis and treatment of the disease in the future, were highlighted in recent articles in Arthritis and Rheumatology and the Journal of Clinical Investigation.

== Music ==
Steere has had a love of music for many years and majored in music in college. During that time and while he was in medical school, he studied violin with Ivan Galamian, who was the Director of Violin Studies at the Juilliard School of Music. He performed violin recitals with David Garvey, who was the pianist for the great soprano, Leontyne Price, and he also performed in the same string quartet with violinist Itzhak Perlman when they were both teenagers at the Meadowmount School of Music.

== Personal ==
Steere has been married for 50 years to Margaret Mercer Steere, and they have four grown children.

== See also ==
- Lyme disease
- Lyme disease controversy
- Jorge Benach
- Willy Burgdorfer
- Spirochete
