= Tick infestation =

- Specialty: Infectious diseases

Ticks are insects known for attaching to and sucking blood from land-dwelling animals (specifically vertebrates). Ticks fall under the category of 'arthropod', and while they are often thought of in the context of disease transmission, they are also known to cause direct harm to hosts through bites, toxin release, and infestation. Infestation can cause symptoms ranging from mild to severe and may even cause death. Hosts can include any number of vertebrates, though humans and livestock are more likely to be the interest of researchers.

== Overview ==
There are two main categories of tick: soft ticks (family Argasidae) and hard ticks (family Ixodidae). A third tick family, Nuttalliellidae, is less commonly discussed. The primary distinction between soft and hard ticks is the amount of time they stay attached to their host. Soft ticks remain attached on the order of a couple of hours and may take multiple blood meals from the same host. Hard ticks, on the other hand, tend to stay attached for several days to weeks, feeding continuously. The ticks that transmit Lyme disease are hard ticks.

Ticks often have a preferred host, but may still attach to a different host when called for. Their preferred host may change depending on the tick's stage of development (e.g., larval vs adult) and the host may or may not carry the transmittable pathogen. An example of these concepts can be found in the deer tick, known to transmit Lyme disease to humans in the US. The larval stage of development takes place in a small mouse. This mouse also carries the bacterium that causes Lyme Disease. The adult deer tick attaches to its namesake, but the deer does not carry the bacterium. Humans are not the preferred natural host, but the adult ticks, containing the bacterium known to cause Lyme disease, can attach to humans and allow for transmission of the bacterium.

Ticks are found around the world, with suggestions that climate change and globalization of travel and commerce may be broadening their scope of residence.

Ticks use various tactics to reach their target host. Sometimes they employ a crawl-like movement to move towards their host. Other times they may perch along blades of grass or other vegetation, ready to move aboard animals as they brush by. After attachment, ticks gain access to a hosts blood supply via use of sharp projections from their mouth known as chelicerae. Under normal physiology conditions, animals would form clots and prevent excess bleeding after damage from something like chelicerae. Ticks account for this by secreting compounds in their saliva that prevent normal healing and promote bleeding.

== Disease state ==
Ticks can cause disease states unrelated to their ability to transmit pathogens such as bacteria and viruses. Symptoms range from mild local irritation at the site of attachment all the way to death. Local reactions can usually be seen within 24–48 hours of attachment and can be associated with swelling, itchiness, and pain. Ticks can attach to most surfaces of the body and may even find residence within cavities such as the ear. More widespread reactions can occur, potentially leading to hives across the body, severe discomfort, and in some cases anaphylaxis (extreme allergic reaction that can affect airways and breathing). In some cases, parts of the tick head can remain lodged at the site of attachment, resulting in more chronic symptoms and greater levels of swelling and tissue damage. Serious skin infections such as cellulitis can set in due to the tissue damage from tick attachment. In rare cases, ticks infestation can result in paralysis, a loss of motor function that can be debilitating and may even result in death.

== Prevention ==
Preventing tick infestation is an important global effort. It is estimated that the worldwide cost associated with controlling tick levels and tick-borne disease is as high as 13.9 to 18.7 million US dollars. There are multiple ways to approach the issue of how to prevent tick infestation. For many years, the main way in which humans thought to control tick infestation was by the use of pesticides against ticks, called acaricides. This has been especially important in the context of ticks that infested cattle. But, these acaricides are often considered toxic, expensive, and decreasingly effective. Much as bacteria can become resistant to antibiotic, Ticks can gain resistance to acaricides, rendering them effective at preventing infestation. Studies suggest that vaccination may be an effective, less environmentally impactful, and less expensive way to prevent tick infestation. A vaccine for humans to prevent tick-borne encephalitis was approved by the CDC in 2021 for use in the US. Though, this is not stated to prevent infestation itself, but rather a specific disease related to infestation.

Some of the best preventive measures for humans to avoid infestation, outside of using pesticidal bug sprays, include avoidance, appropriate clothes, and skin checks after potential tick encounters. Jobs or hobbies that involve outdoor activities are shown to increase the risk of infestation, and as such, avoidance can be as simple as not hiking in or visiting areas known to be home to lots of ticks. Clothes that cover exposed skin can help limit tick attachment, but should not be a substitute for thorough skin and hair checks following a hike in known tick-infested regions.

If someone comes in contact with a tick, they should remove it from their skin, wash the area (soap, water, and an antiseptic), and preserve the tick in alcohol. If symptoms develop, saving the tick will be important for identification. Home remedies (such as vaseline or matches) have been used in the past, but are not currently recommended.

== Tick-borne diseases ==
While ticks are most notable in the public view as the insects responsible for transmitting Lyme disease, they carry and transmit a wide variety of other pathogens as well. The bacterium that causes Lyme is Borrelia burgdorferi, a spirochete. A number of other bacteria are transmitted by ticks, such as Babesia (very important in the context of cattle), Ehrlichia (causes ehrlichiosis), Anaplasma (causes anaplasmosis), Rickettsia (causes Rocky Mountain Spotted Fever), and many others. These bacterial infections]often cause well-described rashes, such as the bullseye rash of Lyme disease, or the spotted rash of Rickettsiosis. Symptoms are variable during these infections, ranging from self-limited to very severe disease. Lyme disease, for example, is known to have potentially severe complications involving the heart, immune system, and neurological systems.

Non-bacterial pathogens transmitted by ticks are also common. Viruses transmitted by arthropods such as ticks are an emerging field of study. Commonly mentioned viruses include phleboviruses, Heartland virus, and Bourbon viruses. Symptoms may include hemorrhagic fever (elevated body temperature involving bleeding from various parts of the body) and thrombocytopenia (low levels of platelets in the body—an important component of blood clotting—deficiency results in worse bleeding). Ticks can also transmit parasitic infection, separate from viruses or bacteria, and are often found to have co-infection with multiple types of pathogen.

There is some evidence that Ixodes ricinus infected with Borrelia burgdorferi may become more efficient at infestation.
