= Infestation =

Invasion and occupation by pests and parasites in host

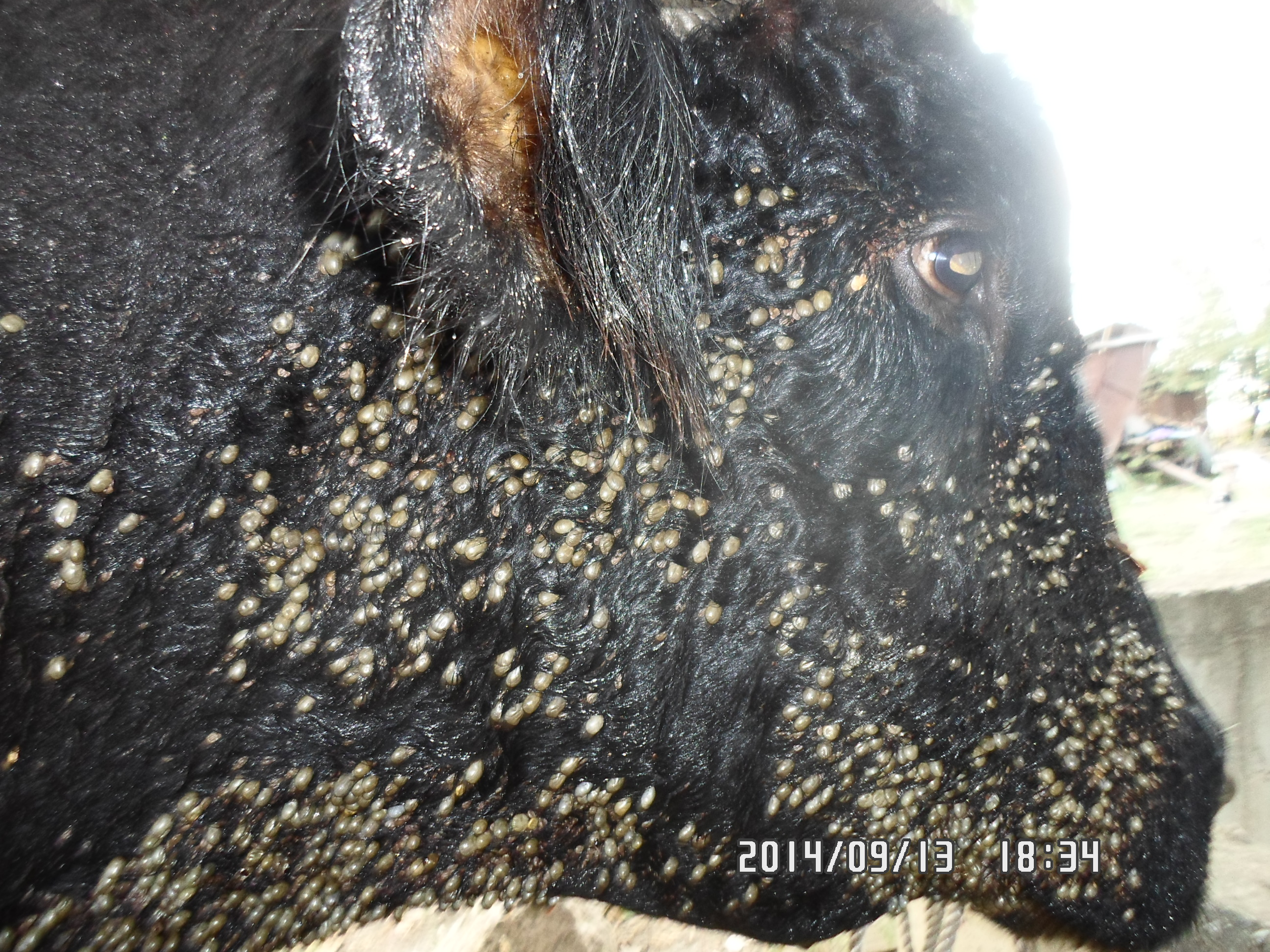
- Tick-infested cow
- Specialty: Infectious disease

Infestation is the state of being invaded or overrun by pests or parasites. It can also refer to the actual organisms living on or within a host.

== Terminology ==
In general, the term "infestation" refers to parasitic diseases caused by animals such as arthropods (i.e. mites, ticks, and lice) and worms, but excluding (except) conditions caused by protozoa, fungi, bacteria, and viruses, which are called infections.

== External and internal ==
Infestations can be classified as either external or internal with regard to the parasites' location in relation to the host.

External or ectoparasitic infestation is a condition in which organisms live primarily on the surface of the host (though porocephaliasis can penetrate viscerally) and includes those involving mites, ticks, head lice and bed bugs.

An internal (or endoparasitic) infestation is a condition in which organisms live within the host and includes those involving worms (though swimmer's itch stays near the surface).

Sometimes, the term "infestation" is reserved for external ectoparasitic infestations while the term infection refers to internal endoparasitic conditions.

== See also ==
- Disinfestation
