= Willy Burgdorfer =

Swiss-born American entomologist (1925–2014)

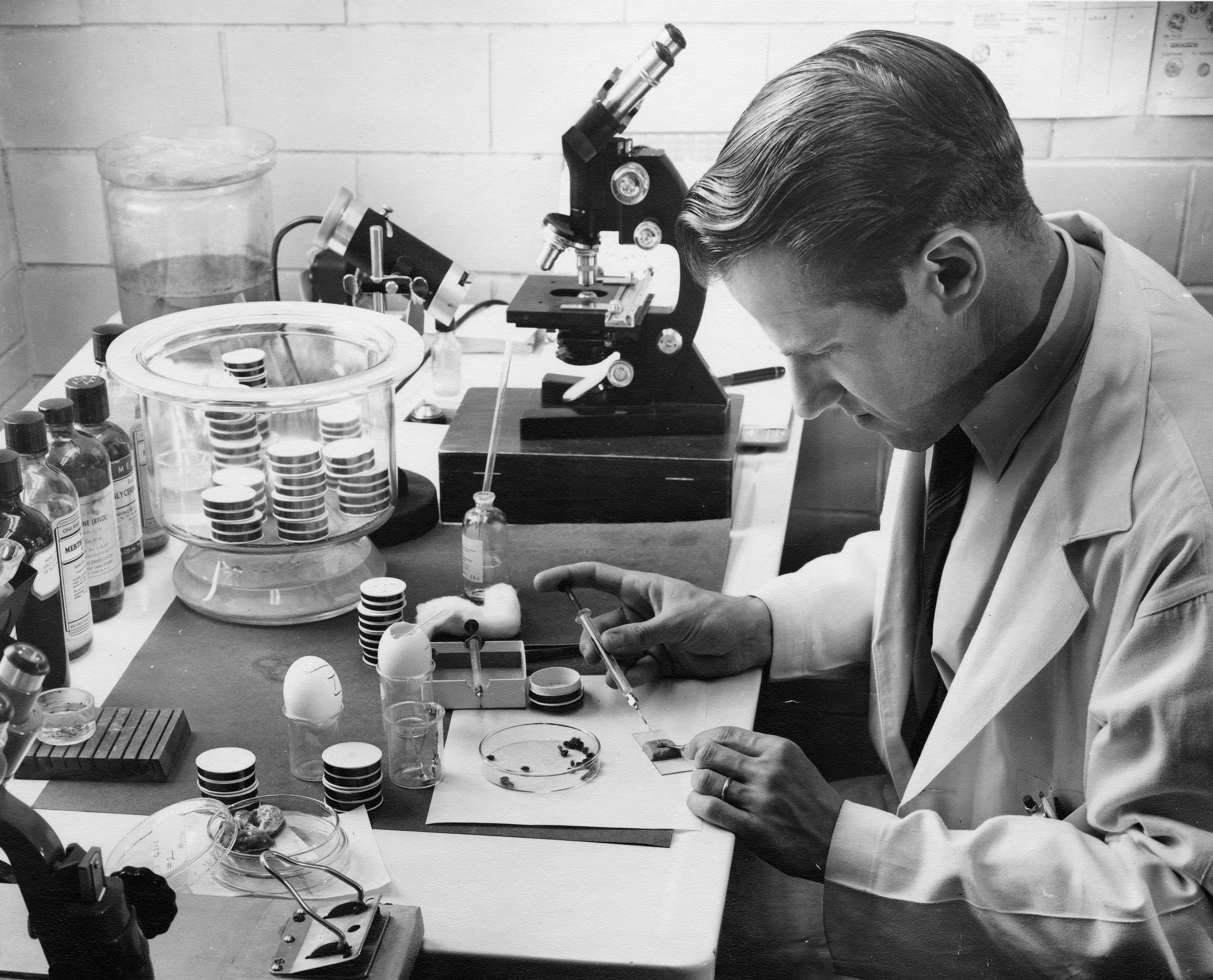
- Burgdorfer inoculating Ornithodoros ticks, 1954.
- Born: June 27, 1925; Basel, Switzerland
- Died: November 17, 2014 (aged 89); Hamilton, Montana
- Education: University of Basel
- Known for: Borrelia burgdorferi
- Scientific career
- Fields: Entomology
- Thesis: Analyse des Infektionsverlaufes bei Ornithodorus moubata (Murray) und der natürlichen Übertragung von Spirochaeta duttoni (1951)

Wilhelm Burgdorfer (June 27, 1925 – November 17, 2014) was a Swiss-American scientist and an international leader in the field of medical entomology. He discovered the bacterial pathogen that causes Lyme disease, a spirochete named Borrelia burgdorferi in his honor.

== Early life and education ==
Burgdorfer was born on June 27, 1925, in Basel, Switzerland. He earned his Ph.D. in zoology, parasitology, and bacteriology from the University of Basel and the Swiss Tropical Institute in Basel.

As a research subject for his thesis he chose to study the development of the African relapsing fever spirochete, Borrelia duttonii, in its tick vector Ornithodoros moubata, and to evaluate this tick's efficiency in transmitting spirochetes during feeding on animal hosts.

During his college years Burgdorfer was a member of a research team investigating outbreaks of Q fever in various parts of Switzerland and became interested in similar research activities carried out at the Rocky Mountain Laboratory (RML) in Hamilton, Montana, a U.S. National Institutes of Health research facility. He joined the RML in 1952 as a research fellow, and later became a research associate in the USPHS's Visiting Scientist Program. In 1957, he became a U.S. citizen and shortly thereafter joined the RML staff as a medical entomologist.

== Career ==
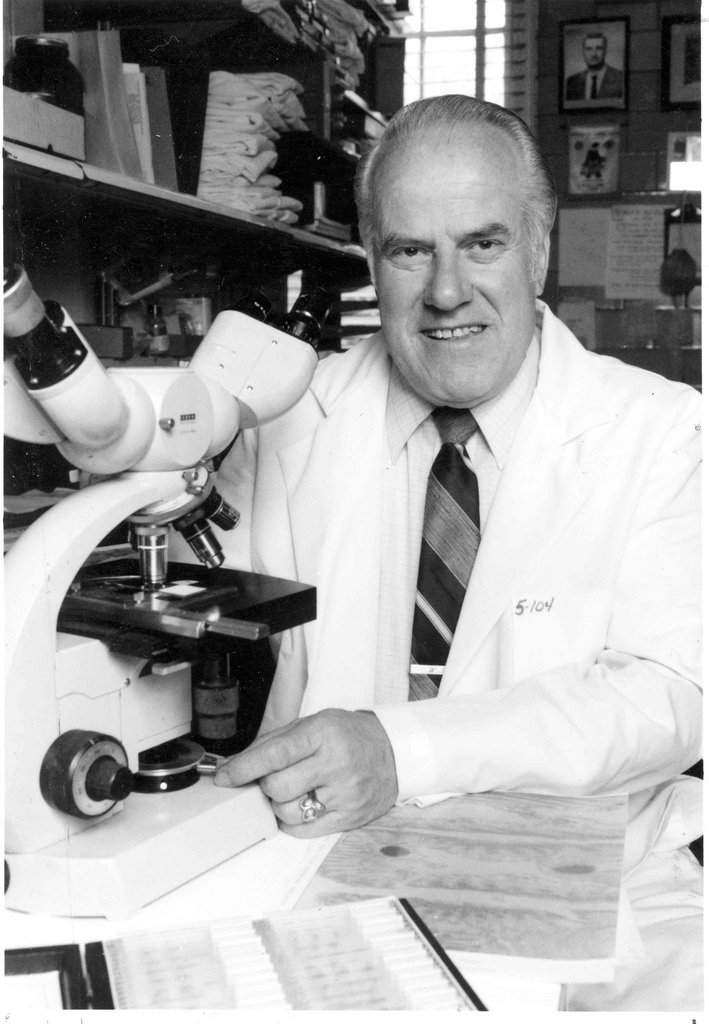
Burgdorfer in 1978

Burgdorfer's research concerned the interactions between animal and human disease agents and their transmitting arthropod vectors, particularly ticks, fleas and mosquitoes. His research contributions are published in more than 225 papers and books, and cover a wide field of investigations including those on relapsing fevers, plague, tularemia, Colorado tick fever, Rocky Mountain spotted fever and other bacterial and viral diseases.

Burgdorfer gained worldwide recognition for his 1982 discovery of a tick-borne spirochete as the long-sought cause of Lyme disease and related disorders in the U.S. and Europe. The agent was named after him — Borrelia burgdorferi.

Throughout his career, Burgdorfer participated in a number of World Health Organization (WHO) and other health organization-sponsored seminars and congresses.

From 1967 to 1972, he served as associate member on the Rickettsial Commission of the Armed Forces Epidemiology Board. For several years (1968–1971) he was also Co-Project Officer of the PL 480-sponsored Research Project on Rickettsial Zoonoses in Egypt and adjacent areas, and from 1979 to 1986, he directed the WHO-sponsored Reference Center for Rickettsial Diseases at RML in Montana, U.S.

== Personal life ==
Burgdorfer was married to Gertrude "Dale" See Burgdorfer until she died in 2005. He later married Lois Rohr; she survived him at the time of his death. He died from complications of Parkinson's disease on November 17, 2014, at a hospital in Hamilton, Montana.

== Later life ==
Although retiring in 1986, Burgdorfer continued his association with the Rocky Mountain Laboratories' Laboratory of Human Bacterial Pathogenesis as scientist emeritus. He was also active on the Scientific/Medical Advisory Committee of the Lyme Disease Foundation. In 1999, he delivered the keynote address at the 12th International Conference on Lyme Disease and Other Spirochetal and Tick-Borne Disorders.

== Honors ==
- Schaudinn-Hoffman Plaque (1985, German Society of Dermatologists)
- Robert Koch Gold Medal (1988 Berlin, Germany)
- Bristol Award (1989, Infectious Diseases Society of America)
- Walter Reed Medal (1990, American Society of Tropical Medicine and Hygiene)
- Doctor Medicina Honoris Causa (1986, University of Bern, Switzerland; 1991, University of Marseille, France)
- Honorary Degrees of Science (1990, Montana State University; 1994, The Ohio State University)

== Selected publications ==
- Burgdorfer, W. Analyse des Infektionsverlaufes bei Ornithodoros moubata (Murray) unter Berücksichtigung der natürlichen Übertragung von Spirochaeta duttoni. Acta Trop. 8:193-262, 1951.
- Burgdorfer, W. and Ekland C. M. Studies on the ecology of Colorado tick fever virus in western Montana. Amer. J. Hyg. 69:127-137, 1959.
- Burgdorfer, W. Evaluation of the fluorescent antibody technique for the detection of Rocky Mountain spotted fever rickettsiae in various tissues. Path. Microbiol. (Switzerland) 24 (Suppl.) 27–39, 1961.
- Burgdorfer, W. Hemolymph test. A technique for detection of rickettsiae in ticks, Amer. J. Trop. Med. 19:1010-1014, 1970.
- Burgdorfer, W., Barbour, A. G., Hayes, S. F., Benach, J. L., Grunwaldt E., and Davis, J. P. Lyme disease — a tick-borne spirochetosis? Science 216:1317-1319, 1982.
- Burgdorfer, W. Discovery of the Lyme disease spirochete and its relation to tick vectors. Yale J. Biol. Med. 57:518-520, 1984.
- Burgdorfer, W. How the discovery of Borrelia burgdorferi came about. Clin. Dermatol. 11:335-338, 1993.
- Burgdorfer, W. Arthropod-Borne Spirochetoses. A Historical Perspective, Editorial, Eur. J. Clin. Microbiol. Infect. Dis. 201: 1–5, 2001.

== See also ==
- Chronic Lyme disease
- Microbiology of Lyme disease
- Jorge Benach
- Allen Steere
