= Jorge Benach =

American medical researcher

Jorge Benach is a medical researcher at the Stony Brook University in New York state. Benach is the chair of the Department of Molecular Genetics and Microbiology. Benach's main area of research is the tick-borne spirochete Borrelia burgdorferi, which is the causative agent of Lyme disease.

Benach also has begun to investigate organisms that could be used as bioterrorism agents, specifically Francisella tularensis, the bacterial agent of tularemia.

Benach graduated with a PhD from Rutgers University in 1972. Benach was named to a National Advisory Allergy and Infectious Diseases Council (NIAID) in 1998 and was named a 1992 Fulbright-Hays Fellow and Exchange Professor.

== Lyme Disease research ==
Benach was one of the early researchers in Lyme disease. Benach and Edward Bosler, Ph.D. collaborated in the dogged and dangerous work of gathering and testing ticks for disease-causing pathogens at the Mashomack Preserve on Shelter Island, off the coast of New York. Benach and Bosler later co-authored the book Lyme Disease and Related Disease Disorders, New York Academy of Sciences (September 1988).

In the fall of 1981, Benach, then at the New York State Health Department, provided NIH researcher Willy Burgdorfer with collections of I. dammini (scapularis) ticks from Shelter Island, as part of an ongoing investigation of Rocky Mounted spotted fever on Long Island. It was in the midgut of two of those ticks that Burgdorfer, looking for RMSF rickettsiae, noticed the “poorly stained, rather long, irregularly coiled spirochetes” that he realized might be the cause of the erythema chronicum migrans rash of Lyme disease. Benach subsequently supplied Burgdorfer with more field-collected ticks from Shelter Island, along with sera from clinically diagnosed patients with Lyme disease. The collaborative effort enabled Burgdorfer to confirm his suspicions about the new spirochete.

Benach and pathology colleague Marc Golightly developed the critical laboratory test to detect the presence of antibodies to Borrelia burgdorferi, an ELISA test that became the original “gold standard” for Lyme diagnosis.

Benach continues to work with borrelia organisms at the Center for Infectious Diseases, Department of Molecular Genetics and Microbiology, Stony Brook University. Benach chairs the scientific and advisory board of the Tick-Borne Disease Institute of the New York State department of health and is an ad hoc committee member of the National Research Fund for Tick-Borne Diseases.

== See also ==
- Allen Steere
- Willy Burgdorfer
