= Deer tick =

Deer tick may refer to a few different Ixodes spp.:

- Ixodes scapularis, the eastern North America black-legged tick
- Ixodes pacificus, the western North America black-legged tick
- Ixodes ricinus, the European tick sometimes called a "deer tick" or "sheep tick"

== Other ==
- Deer Tick (band), American alt-rock-folk band

== See also ==
- Lyme disease, a well-known disease spread by ticks
- Deer tick virus, causes encephalitis
