= Scarlet fever serum =

Scarlet fever serum was used beginning in November 1900 after its development in the Sero-Therapeutic Laboratory of Rudolph Hospital in Vienna, Austria. The serum was taken from the blood of horses. Infected children were injected in their abdominal skin by Dr. Paul Moser. Mortality rates from scarlet fever (also known as scarlatina) declined significantly following the use of the blood serum.

Moser at first used scarlet fever serum primarily on the most severely sick persons. After achieving positive results it was applied in the first or second day following contraction of scarlet fever. In many cases the children treated demonstrated great improvement in a very short time, with their fevers going away quickly. Moser worked with four hundred children suffering from scarlatina at St. Anne's Hospital. The mortality rate of those he treated was 8.9%. This compared quite favorably when measured against the 13.09% among children in Vienna hospitals where the scarlet fever serum was not administered. Moser's antitoxin reduced the mortality of scarlet fever by 40%.

At no time was the volume of serum available sufficient. As of November 1902 a strong concentrated scarlet fever serum was unavailable.

== Later serums 1903–1930 ==
Dr. Aronson, a bacteriologist who worked at the Emperor and Empress Frederick Children's Hospital of Berlin, Germany, used a scarlet fever serum with positive results in early 1903. Specialists at the Chicago, Illinois Board of Health claimed that Aronson was administering a scarlet fever serum which they had discovered.

Aronson may have been the first to successfully segregate the scarlet fever bacillus. Perhaps this was a result of a micrococcus obtained from throat cultures. However, bacteriologists in the United States had been unsuccessful in similar experiments around this time.

In July 1923 it was announced that two Italian scientists, Giovanni di Cristina and Giuseppe Carolla of Rome, Italy, had isolated the scarlet fever germ and developed a serum.

Dr. A. Raymond Dochez (1882 – June 30, 1964), a native of San Francisco, California, is credited with discovering a serum cure for scarlet fever at New York-Presbyterian Hospital, while he was a researcher there in 1924. His antitoxin was developed following six years of study.

In Chicago, husband and wife Gladys and George Frederick Dick also developed an antitoxin and test for scarlet fever in 1924.

A Romanian scientist, Prince Cantacuzene, said that scarlet fever was far from conquered in July 1930. His own experiments with streptococcus led him to believe that scarlet fever was not a manifestation of the streptococcus bacillus. However, he thought that streptococcus might work as a conduit for the true scarlet fever bacillus. He contended that serums obtained from persons convalescing from scarlet fever were more effective than ones prepared from horse cultures.
