= Scarlet fever =

Infectious disease

- Other names: Scarlatina, scarletina
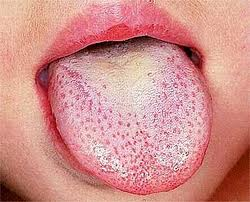
- White strawberry tongue in early stage
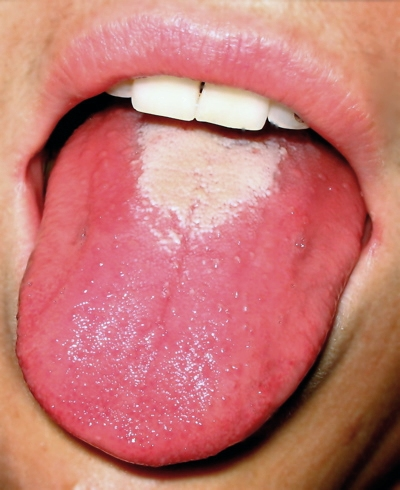
- Red strawberry tongue seen in later stage
- Specialty: Infectious disease
- Symptoms: Sore throat, fever, headaches, swollen lymph nodes in the neck, characteristic rash
- Complications: Kidney disease, rheumatic fever, arthritis
- Usual onset: 5–15 years old
- Causes: Group A streptococcal infection
- Diagnostic method: Throat culture
- Prevention: Handwashing, not sharing personal items, staying away from sick people
- Treatment: Antibiotics
- Medication: Penicillin VK, cefalexin, amoxicillin, clindamycin, erythromycin
- Prognosis: Typically good

Scarlet fever, also known as scarlatina and scarlatiniform rash, is an infectious disease caused by Streptococcus pyogenes, a Group A streptococcus (GAS). It most commonly affects children and young adolescents between five and 15 years of age. The signs and symptoms include a sore throat, fever, headache, swollen lymph nodes, and a characteristic rash. The face is flushed and the rash is red and blanching. It typically feels like sandpaper and the tongue may be red and bumpy. The rash occurs as a result of capillary damage by exotoxins produced by S. pyogenes. On darker-pigmented skin the rash may be hard to discern.

Scarlet fever develops in a small number of people who have strep throat or streptococcal skin infections. The bacteria are usually spread by people coughing or sneezing. It can also be spread when a person touches an object that has the bacteria on it and then touches their mouth or nose. The diagnosis is typically confirmed by culturing swabs of the throat.

There is no vaccine for scarlet fever. Prevention is by frequent handwashing, not sharing personal items, and staying away from other people when sick. The disease is treatable with antibiotics, which reduce symptoms and spread, and prevent most complications. Outcomes with scarlet fever are typically good if treated. Long-term complications as a result of scarlet fever include kidney disease, rheumatic fever, and arthritis.

In the early 20th century, scarlet fever was a leading cause of death in children, but even before World War II and the introduction of antibiotics, its severity was already declining. This decline is suggested to be due to better living conditions, the introduction of better control measures, or a decline in the virulence of the bacteria. In recent years, there have been signs of antibiotic resistance; there was an outbreak in Hong Kong in 2011 and in the UK in 2014, and occurrence of the disease rose by 68% in the UK between 2014 and 2018. Research published in October 2020 showed that infection of the bacterium by three viruses has led to more virulent strains of the bacterium.

== Signs and symptoms ==
Scarlet fever typically presents with a sudden onset of sore throat, fever, and malaise. Headache, nausea, vomiting and abdominal pain may also be present. Scarlet fever usually follows from a group A streptococcal infection that involves a strep throat, such as streptococcal tonsillitis or more usually streptococcal pharyngitis. Often these can present together, known as pharyngotonsillitis. The signs and symptoms are therefore those of a strep throat but these are followed by the inclusion of the characteristic widespread rash. The rash usually appears one to two days later, but may appear before or up to seven days following feeling ill.

It generally hurts to swallow. However, not all cases present with a fever, the degree of tiredness may vary, the sore throat and tongue changes might be slight or absent, and in some the rash can be patchy rather than diffuse. Cough, hoarseness, runny nose, diarrhea, and conjunctivitis are typically absent in scarlet fever; such symptoms indicate what is more likely a viral infection.

=== Mouth and throat ===
Throat of a child with a positive throat culture for streptococcal pharyngitis, with enlarged tonsils clearly visible.

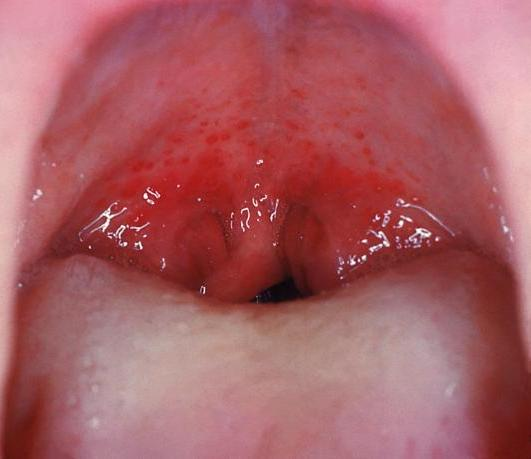
Streptococcal pharyngitis with red throat/uvula and spots on roof of mouth

Strep throat is usually associated with fatigue and a fever of over 39 °C (102.2 °F). The tonsils may appear red and enlarged and are typically covered in exudate. The throat may be red with small red spots on the roof of the mouth. The uvula can look red and swollen. 30% to 60% of cases have associated enlarged and tender lymph nodes in the neck. During the first two days of illness the tongue may have a whitish coating from which red swollen papillae protrude, giving the appearance of a "white strawberry tongue". After four to five days when the white coating sheds it becomes a "red strawberry tongue". The symptomatic appearance of the tongue is part of the rash that is characteristic of scarlet fever.

=== Rash ===
Scarlet fever rash in light skin

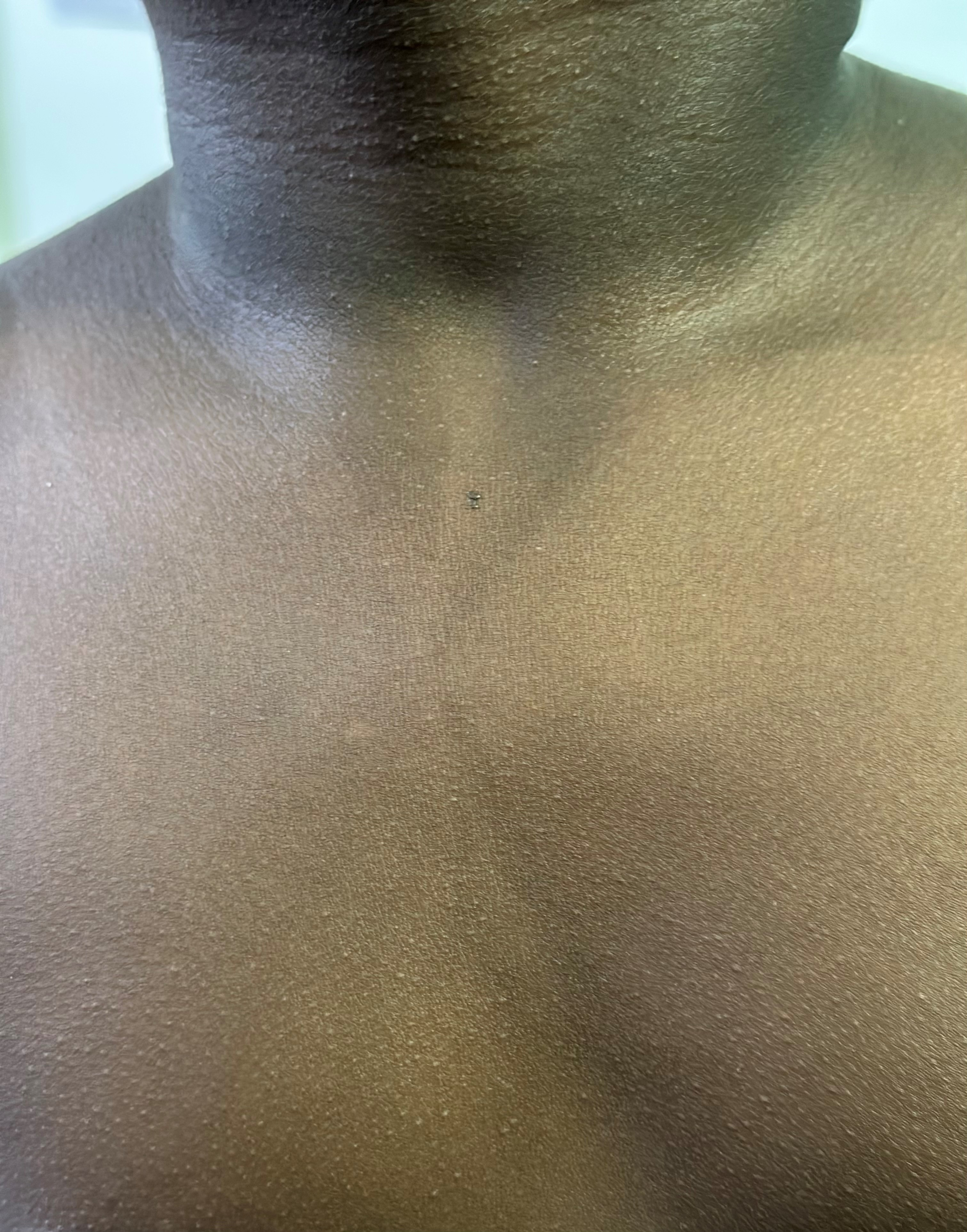
Scarlet fever rash in dark skin

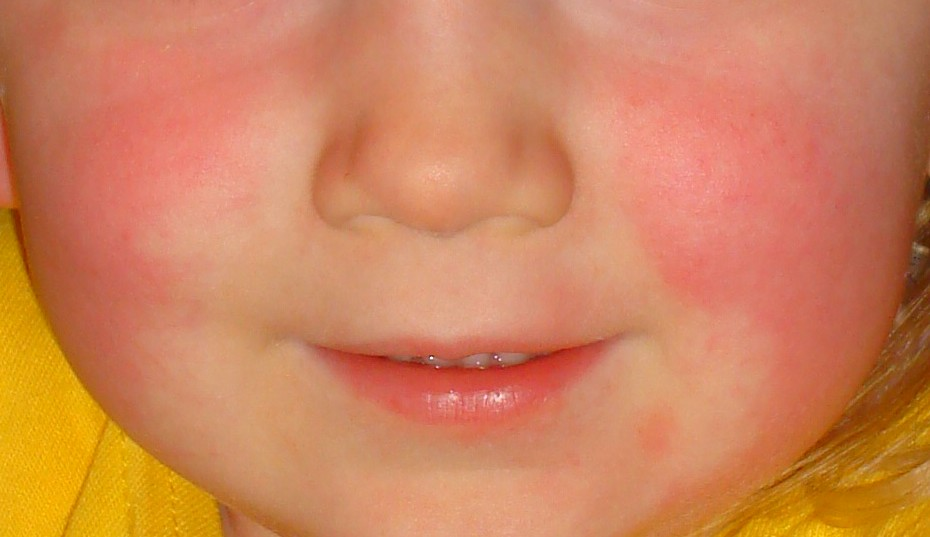
Red cheeks and pale area around the mouth in scarlet fever

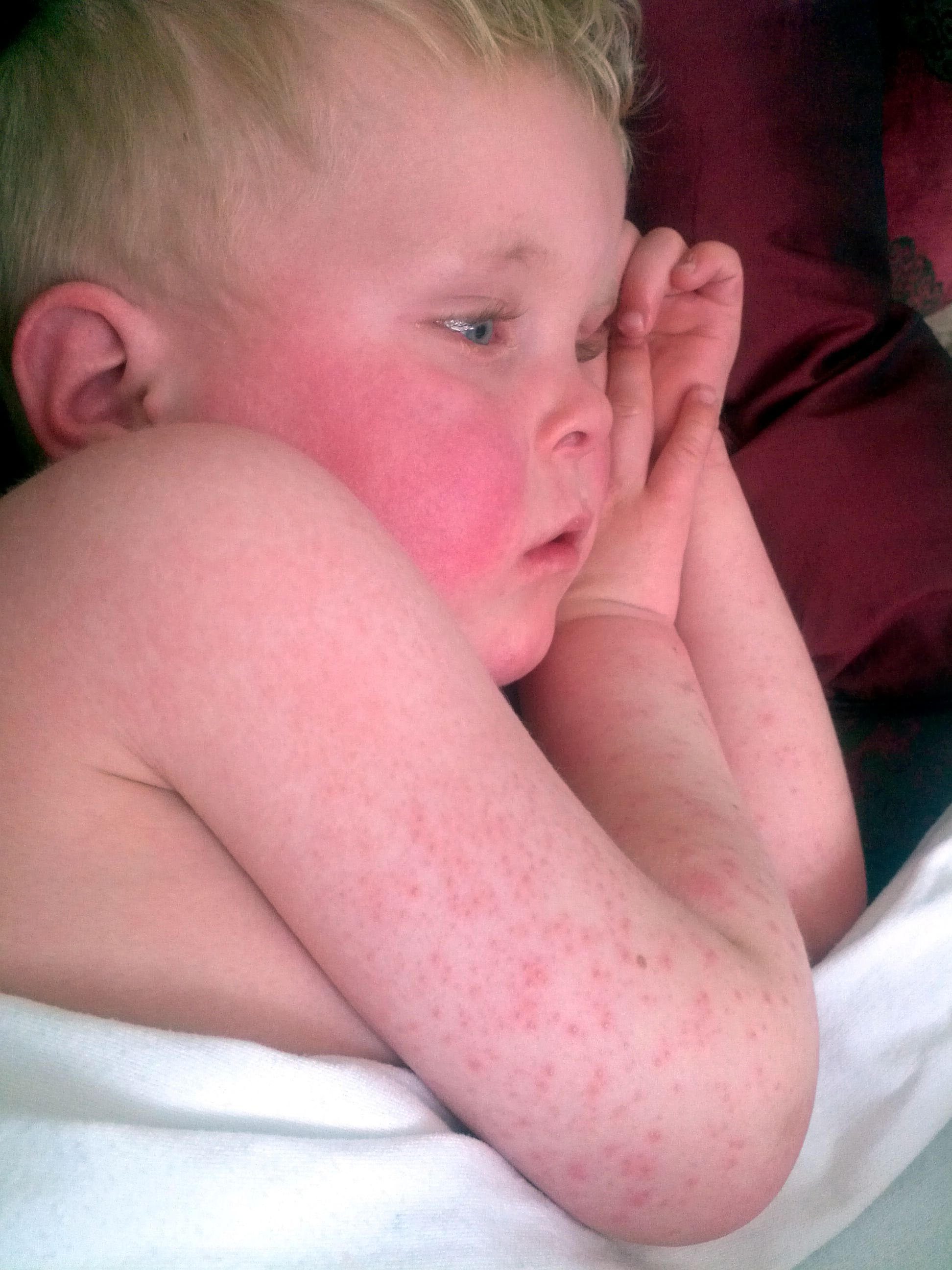
Characteristic red cheeks and rash of scarlet fever

The characteristic rash has been denoted as "scarlatiniform", and it appears as a diffuse redness of the skin with small bumps resembling goose bumps. It typically appears as small flat spots on the neck or torso before developing into small bumps that spread to the arms and legs. It tends to feel rough like sandpaper. The cheeks might look flushed with a pale area around the mouth. The scarlet fever rash generally looks red on white and pale skin, and might be difficult to see on brown or black skin, in whom the bumps are typically larger, the skin looks like sandpaper, and the paleness around the mouth is less obvious. The rash does not appear on the palms and soles. The reddened skin blanches when pressure is applied to it. The skin may feel itchy, but is not painful.

A more intense redness on the inside of skin folds and creases might be noticed. These are lines of petechiae, appearing as pink/red areas located in arm pits and elbow pits. It takes around a week for the main rash to disappear. This may be followed by several weeks of peeling of the skin of typically fingers and toes. The desquamation process usually begins on the face and progresses downward on the body. Sometimes, this peeling is the only sign that scarlet fever occurred. If the case of scarlet fever is uncomplicated, recovery from the fever and clinical symptoms, other than the process of desquamation, occurs in 5–10 days. After the desquamation, the skin will be left with a sunburned appearance.

=== Variable presentations ===
Children younger than five years old may have atypical presentations and many of the common signs and symptoms may be missing or different. Children younger than 3 years old can present with nasal congestion and a lower grade fever. Infants may present with symptoms of increased irritability and decreased appetite.

=== Complications ===
The complications, which can arise from scarlet fever when left untreated or inadequately treated, can be divided into two categories: suppurative and nonsuppurative.

Suppurative complications: These are rare complications that arise either from direct spread to structures that are close to the primary site of infection, or spread through the lymphatic system or blood. In the first case, scarlet fever may spread to the pharynx. Possible problems from this method of spread include peritonsillar or retropharyngeal abscesses, cellulitis, mastoiditis, or sinusitis.

In the second case, the streptococcal infection may spread through the lymphatic system or the blood to areas of the body further away from the pharynx. A few examples of the many complications that can arise from those methods of spread include endocarditis, pneumonia, or meningitis.

Nonsuppurative complications: These complications arise from certain subtypes of group A streptococci that cause an autoimmune response in the body through what has been termed molecular mimicry. In these cases, the antibodies which the person's immune system developed to attack the group A streptococci are also able to attack the person's own tissues. The following complications result, depending on which tissues in the person's body are targeted by those antibodies.

- Acute rheumatic fever: This is a complication that results 2–6 weeks after a group A streptococcal infection of the upper respiratory tract. It presents in developing countries, where antibiotic treatment of streptococcal infections is less common, as a febrile illness with several clinical manifestations, which are organized into what is called the Jones criteria. These criteria include arthritis, carditis, neurological issues, and skin findings. Diagnosis also depends on evidence of a prior group A streptococcal infection in the upper respiratory tract (as seen in streptococcal pharyngitis and scarlet fever). The carditis is the result of the immunologic response targeting the person's heart tissue, and it is the most serious sequela that develops from acute rheumatic fever. When this involvement of the heart tissue occurs, it is called rheumatic heart disease. In most cases of rheumatic heart disease, the mitral valve is affected, ultimately leading to mitral stenosis. The link to rheumatic fever and heart disease is a particular concern in Australia, because of the high prevalence of these diseases in Aboriginal and Torres Strait Islander communities.
- Poststreptococcal glomerulonephritis: This is inflammation of the kidney, which presents 1–2 weeks after a group A streptococcal pharyngitis. It can also develop after an episode of Impetigo or any group A streptococcal infection in the skin (this differs from acute rheumatic fever which only follows group A streptococcal pharyngitis). It is the result of the autoimmune response to the streptococcal infection affecting part of the kidney. Persons present with what is called acute nephritic syndrome, in which they have high blood pressure, swelling, and urinary abnormalities. Urinary abnormalities include blood and protein found in the urine, as well as less urine production overall.
- Poststreptococcal reactive arthritis: The presentation of arthritis after a recent episode of group A streptococcal pharyngitis raises suspicion for acute rheumatic fever, since it is one of the Jones criteria for that separate complication. But, when the arthritis is an isolated symptom, it is referred to as poststreptococcal reactive arthritis. This arthritis can involve a variety of joints throughout the body, unlike the arthritis of acute rheumatic fever, which primarily affects larger joints such as the knee joints. It can present less than 10 days after the group A streptococcal pharyngitis.

== Cause ==
Strep throat spreads by close contact among people, via respiratory droplets (for example, saliva or nasal discharge). A person in close contact with another person infected with group A streptococcal pharyngitis has a 35% chance of becoming infected. One in ten children who are infected with group A streptococcal pharyngitis will develop scarlet fever.

== Pathophysiology ==
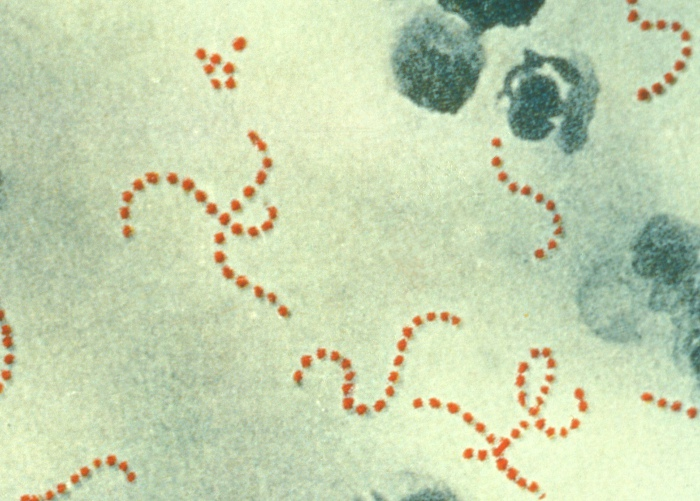
Streptococcus pyogenes

The rash of scarlet fever, which is what differentiates this disease from an isolated group A strep pharyngitis (or strep throat), is caused by specific strains of group A streptococcus that produce a streptococcal pyrogenic exotoxin, which is mainly responsible for the skin manifestation of the infection. These toxin-producing strains cause scarlet fever in people who do not already have antitoxin antibodies. Streptococcal pyrogenic exotoxins – SPEs A, B, C, and F have been identified. The pyrogenic exotoxins, also called erythrogenic toxins, cause the erythematous rash of scarlet fever. The strains of group A streptococcus that cause scarlet fever need specific bacteriophages for there to be pyrogenic exotoxin production. Specifically, bacteriophage T12 is responsible for the production of speA. Streptococcal Pyrogenic Exotoxin A, speA, is the one most commonly associated with cases of scarlet fever that are complicated by the immune-mediated sequelae of acute rheumatic fever and post-streptococcal glomerulonephritis.

These toxins are also known as "superantigens" because they can cause an extensive immune response by activating some of the cells that are mainly responsible for the person's immune system. Although the body responds to the toxins it encounters by making antibodies, those antibodies will only protect against that particular subset of toxins. They will not necessarily completely protect a person from future group A streptococcal infections, because there are 12 different pyrogenic exotoxins that may be produced by the disease, and future infections may produce a different subset of those toxins.

=== Microbiology ===
The disease is caused by secretion of pyrogenic exotoxins by the infecting Streptococcus bacteria. Streptococcal pyrogenic exotoxin A (speA) is probably the best studied of these toxins. It is carried by the bacteriophage T12 which integrates into the streptococcal genome from where the toxin is transcribed. The phage itself integrates into a serine tRNA gene on the chromosome.

The T12 virus itself has not been placed into a taxon by the International Committee on Taxonomy of Viruses. It has a double-stranded DNA genome and on morphological grounds appears to be a member of the Siphoviridae.

The speA gene was cloned and sequenced in 1986. It is 753 base pairs in length and encodes a 29.244 kilodalton (kDa) protein. The protein contains a putative 30-amino-acid signal peptide; removal of the signal sequence gives a predicted molecular weight of 25.787 kDa for the secreted protein. Both a promoter and a ribosome binding site (Shine-Dalgarno sequence) are present upstream of the gene. A transcriptional terminator is located 69 bases downstream from the translational termination codon. The carboxy terminal portion of the protein exhibits extensive homology with the carboxy terminus of Staphylococcus aureus enterotoxins B and C1.

Streptococcal phages other than T12 may also carry the speA gene.

== Diagnosis ==
Although the presentation of scarlet fever can be clinically diagnosed, further testing may be required to distinguish it from other illnesses. Also, history of a recent exposure to someone with strep throat can be useful in diagnosis. There are two methods used to confirm suspicion of scarlet fever; rapid antigen detection test and throat culture.

The rapid antigen detection test is a specific test but not sensitive. This means that if the result is positive (indicating that the group A strep antigen was detected and therefore confirming that the person has a group A strep pharyngitis), then it is appropriate to treat the people with scarlet fever with antibiotics. But, if the rapid antigen detection test is negative (indicating that they do not have group A strep pharyngitis), then a throat culture is required to confirm, as the first test could have yielded a false negative result. In the early 21st century, the throat culture is the current "gold standard" for diagnosis.

Serologic testing seeks evidence of the antibodies that the body produces against the streptococcal infection, including antistreptolysin-O and antideoxyribonuclease B. It takes the body 2–3 weeks to make these antibodies, so this type of testing is not useful for diagnosing a current infection. But it is useful when assessing a person who may have one of the complications from a previous streptococcal infection.

Throat cultures done after antibiotic therapy can show if the infection has been removed. These throat swabs, however, are not indicated, because up to 25% of properly treated individuals can continue to carry the streptococcal infection while being asymptomatic.

=== Differential diagnosis ===
Scarlet fever might appear similar to Kawasaki disease, which has a characteristic red but not white strawberry tongue, and staphylococcal scarlatina which does not have the strawberry tongue at all. Other conditions that might appear similar include impetigo, erysipelas, measles, chickenpox, and hand-foot-and-mouth disease, and may be distinguished by the pattern of symptoms.

- Viral exanthem: Viral infections are often accompanied by a rash which can be described as morbilliform or maculopapular. This type of rash is accompanied by a prodromal period of cough and runny nose in addition to a fever, indicative of a viral process.
- Allergic or contact dermatitis: The erythematous appearance of the skin will be in a more localized distribution rather than the diffuse and generalized rash seen in scarlet fever.
- Drug eruption: These are potential side effects of taking certain drugs such as penicillin. The reddened maculopapular rash which results can be itchy and be accompanied by a fever.
- Kawasaki disease: Children with this disease also present with a strawberry tongue and undergo a desquamative process on their palms and soles. However, these children tend to be younger than five years old, their fever lasts longer (at least five days), and they have additional clinical criteria (including signs such as conjunctival redness and cracked lips), which can help distinguish this from scarlet fever.
- Toxic shock syndrome: Both streptococcal and staphylococcal bacteria can cause this syndrome. Clinical manifestations include diffuse rash and desquamation of the palms and soles. It can be distinguished from scarlet fever by low blood pressure, lack of sandpaper texture for the rash, and multi-organ system involvement.
- Staphylococcal scalded skin syndrome: This is a disease that occurs primarily in young children due to a toxin-producing strain of the bacteria Staphylococcus aureus. The abrupt start of the fever and diffused sunburned appearance of the rash can resemble scarlet fever. However, this rash is associated with tenderness and large blister formation. These blisters easily pop, followed by causing the skin to peel.
- Staphylococcal scarlet fever: The rash is identical to the streptococcal scarlet fever in distribution and texture, but the skin affected by the rash will be tender.

== Prevention ==
One method is long-term use of antibiotics to prevent future group A streptococcal infections. This method is only indicated for people who have had complications like recurrent attacks of acute rheumatic fever or rheumatic heart disease. Antibiotics are limited in their ability to prevent these infections since there are a variety of subtypes of group A streptococci that can cause the infection.

Although there are currently no vaccines available, the vaccine approach has a greater likelihood of effectively preventing group A streptococcal infections in the future because vaccine formulations can target multiple subtypes of the bacteria. A vaccine developed by George and Gladys Dick in 1924 was discontinued in the 1940s due to the introduction of the antibiotic penicillin. Difficulties in vaccine development include the considerable strain variety of group A streptococci present in the environment and the amount of time and number of people needed for appropriate trials for safety and efficacy of any potential vaccine. There have been several attempts to create a vaccine in the past few decades. These vaccines, which are still in the development phase, expose the person to proteins present on the surface of the group A streptococci to activate an immune response that will prepare the person to fight and prevent future infections.

There used to be a diphtheria scarlet fever vaccine. It was, however, found not to be effective. This product was discontinued by the end of World War II.

== Treatment ==
Antibiotics to combat the streptococcal infection are the mainstay of treatment for scarlet fever. Prompt administration of appropriate antibiotics decreases the length of illness. Peeling of the outer layer of skin, however, will happen despite treatment. One of the main goals of treatment is to prevent the child from developing one of the suppurative or nonsuppurative complications, especially acute rheumatic fever. As long as antibiotics are started within nine days, it is very unlikely for the child to develop acute rheumatic fever. Antibiotic therapy has not been shown to prevent the development of post-streptococcal glomerulonephritis. Another important reason for prompt treatment with antibiotics is the ability to prevent transmission of the infection between children. An infected individual is most likely to pass on the infection to another person during the first two weeks. A child is no longer contagious (able to pass the infection to another child) after 24 hours of antibiotics.

The antibiotic of choice is Penicillin V which is taken by mouth. In countries without a liquid Penicillin V product, children unable to take tablets can be given amoxicillin which comes in a liquid form and is equally effective. Duration of treatment is 10 days. Benzathine penicillin G can be given as a one time intramuscular injection as another alternative if swallowing pills is not possible. If the person is allergic to the family of antibiotics which both penicillin and amoxicillin are a part of (beta-lactam antibiotics), a first generation cephalosporin is used. Cephalosporin antibiotics, however, can still cause adverse reactions in people whose allergic reaction to penicillin is a Type 1 Hypersensitivity reaction. In those cases it is appropriate to choose clindamycin or erythromycin instead. Tonsillectomy, although once a reasonable treatment for recurrent streptococcal pharyngitis, is not indicated, as a person can still be infected with group A streptococcus without their tonsils.

=== Antibiotic resistance and resurgence ===
A drug-resistant strain of scarlet fever, resistant to macrolide antibiotics such as erythromycin, but retaining drug-sensitivity to beta-lactam antibiotics, such as penicillin, emerged in Hong Kong in 2011, accounting for at least two deaths in that city—the first such in over a decade. About 60% of circulating strains of the group A streptococcus that cause scarlet fever in Hong Kong are resistant to macrolide antibiotics, according to Professor Yuen Kwok-yung, head of Hong Kong University's microbiology department. Previously, observed resistance rates had been 10–30%; the increase is likely the result of overuse of macrolide antibiotics in recent years.

There was also an outbreak in the UK in 2014, and the National Health Service reported a 68% increase in the number of S. pyogenes identified in laboratory reports between 2014 and 2018.

New research published in October 2020 indicates that the bacterium appears to be getting more robust after being infected with viruses, specifically the North-East Asian serotype M12 (emm12) (group A Streptococcus, GAS). They found three new genes, acquired from viruses, which cause development of "superantigens" targeting white blood cells, resulting in a more virulent strain of the bacterium.

A vaccine that will protect against the 180 to 200 types of bacteria causing the disease has been worked on for over 20 years, but as of 2020 a safe one had not yet been developed.

== Epidemiology ==
Scarlet fever occurs equally in both males and females. Children are most commonly infected, typically between 5–15 years old. Although streptococcal infections can happen at any time of year, infection rates peak in the winter and spring months, typically in colder climates.

The morbidity and mortality of scarlet fever has declined since the 18th and 19th centuries when there were epidemics of this disease. Around 1900 the mortality rate in multiple places reached 25%. The improvement in prognosis can be attributed to the use of penicillin in the treatment of this disease. The frequency of scarlet fever cases has also been declining over the past century.

There have been several reported outbreaks of the disease in various countries in the past decade. The reason for these increases remains unclear in the medical community. Between 2013 and 2016 population rates of scarlet fever in England increased from 8.2 to 33.2 per 100,000 and hospital admissions for scarlet fever increased by 97%. Further increases in the reporting of scarlet fever cases have been noted in England during the 2021–2022 season (September to September) and so far also in the season 2022–2023. The World Health Organization has reported an increase in scarlet fever (and iGAS – invasive GAS cases) in England, and other European countries during this time. Increases have been reported in France and Ireland. In the US, cases of scarlet fever are not reported, but as of December 2022, the CDC was looking at a possible increase in the numbers of invasive GAS infections reported in children. In late December 2022, the CDC's Health Alert Network issued an advisory on the reported increases in invasive GAS infections.

== History ==
It is unclear when a description of this disease was first recorded. Hippocrates, writing around 400 BC, described the condition of a person with a reddened skin and fever.

The first unambiguous description of the disease in the medical literature appeared in the 1553 book De Tumoribus praeter Naturam by the Sicilian anatomist and physician Giovanni Filippo Ingrassia, where he referred to it as rossalia. He also made a point to distinguish that this presentation had different characteristics from measles. It was redescribed by Johann Weyer during an epidemic in lower Germany between 1564 and 1565; he referred to it as scarlatina anginosa. The first unequivocal description of scarlet fever appeared in a book by Joannes Coyttarus of Poitiers, De febre purpura epidemiale et contagiosa libri duo, which was published in 1578 in Paris. Daniel Sennert of Wittenberg described the classical 'scarlatinal desquamation' in 1572 and was also the first to describe the early arthritis, scarlatinal dropsy, and ascites associated with the disease.

In 1675 the term that has been commonly used to refer to scarlet fever, "scarlatina", was written by Thomas Sydenham, an English physician.

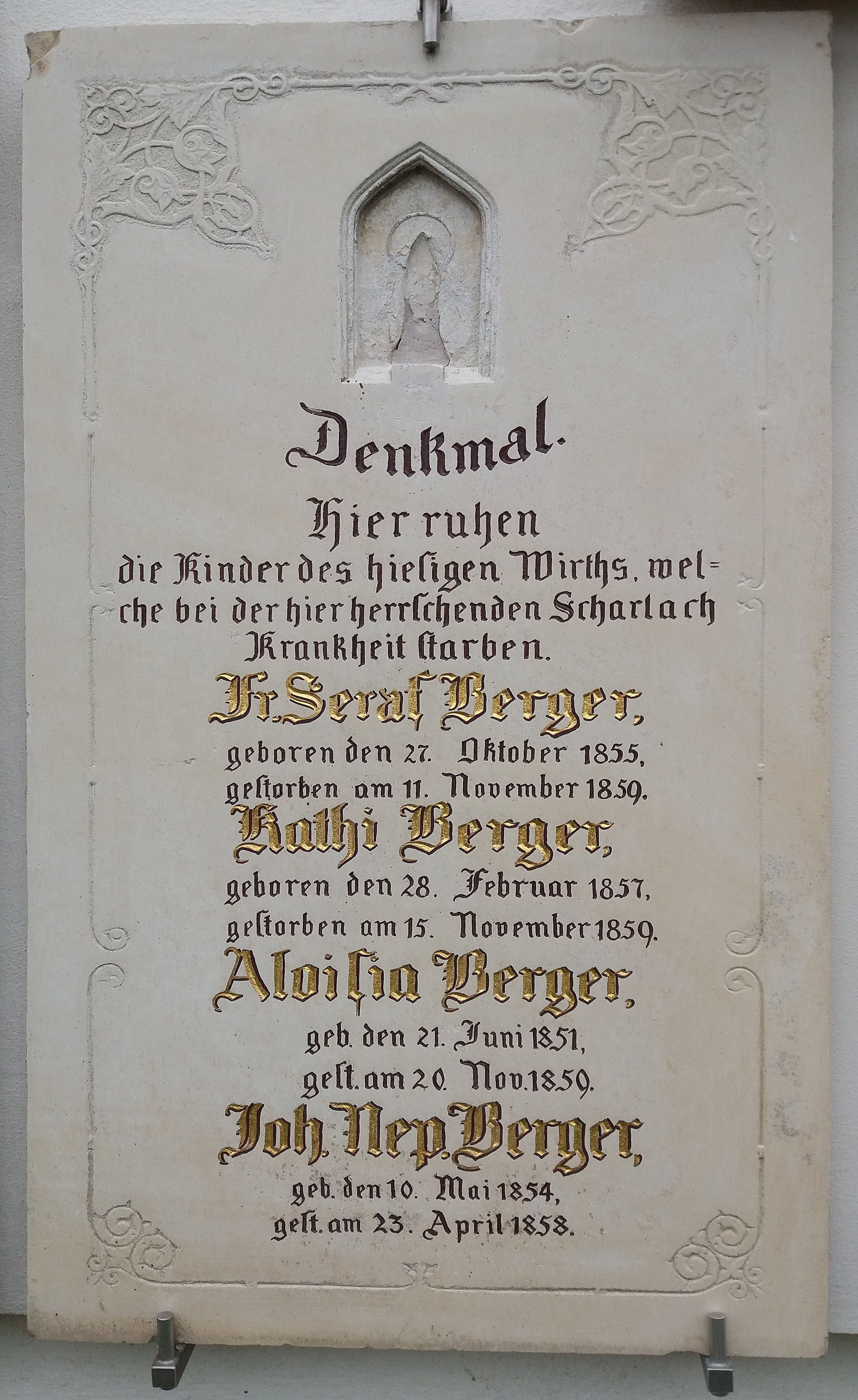
Bad Füssing, Germany: Memorial to the local innkeeper's four children, who all died during a local wave of scarlet fever in 1858–59

In 1827, Richard Bright was the first to recognize the involvement of the renal system in scarlet fever.

The association between streptococci and disease was first described in 1874 by Theodor Billroth, discussing people with skin infections. Billroth also coined the genus name Streptococcus. In 1884 Friedrich Julius Rosenbach edited the name to its current one, Streptococcus pyogenes, after further looking at the bacteria in the skin lesions. The organism was first cultured in 1883 by the German surgeon Friedrich Fehleisen from erysipelas lesions.

Also in 1884, the German physician Friedrich Loeffler was the first to show the presence of streptococci in the throats of people with scarlet fever. Because not all people with pharyngeal streptococci developed scarlet fever, these findings remained controversial for some time. The association between streptococci and scarlet fever was confirmed by Alphonse Dochez and George and Gladys Dick in the early 1900s.

Also in 1884, the world's first convalescent home for people with scarlet fever was opened at Brockley Hill, Stanmore, founded by Mary Wardell.

Nil Filatov (in 1895) and Clement Dukes (in 1894) described an exanthematous disease which they thought was a form of rubella, but in 1900, Dukes described it as a separate illness which came to be known as Dukes' disease, Filatov's disease, or fourth disease. However, in 1979, Keith Powell identified it as in fact the same illness as the form of scarlet fever which is caused by staphylococcal exotoxin and is known as staphylococcal scalded skin syndrome.

Scarlet fever serum from horses' blood was used in the treatment of children beginning in 1900 and reduced mortality rates significantly.

In 1906, Austrian pediatrician Clemens von Pirquet postulated that disease-causing immune complexes were responsible for the nephritis that followed scarlet fever.

Bacteriophages were discovered in 1915 by Frederick Twort. His work was overlooked and bacteriophages were later rediscovered by Felix d'Herelle in 1917. The specific association of scarlet fever with the group A streptococci had to await the development of Rebecca Lancefield's streptococcal grouping scheme in the 1920s. George and Gladys Dick showed that cell-free filtrates could induce the erythematous reaction characteristic of scarlet fever, proving that this reaction was due to a toxin. Karelitz and Stempien discovered that extracts from human serum globulin and placental globulin can be used as lightening agents for scarlet fever and this was used later as the basis for the Dick test. The association of scarlet fever and bacteriophages was described in 1926 by Cantacuzène (Ioan Cantacuzino) and Bonciu.

There was a widespread epidemic of scarlet fever in 1922. Among the victims of this epidemic was Agathe Whitehead.

An antitoxin for scarlet fever was developed in 1924. The discovery of penicillin and its subsequent widespread use significantly reduced the mortality of this once-feared disease. The first toxin which causes this disease was cloned and sequenced in 1986 by Weeks and Ferretti.

The incidence of scarlet fever was reported to be increasing in countries including England, Wales, South Korea, Vietnam, China, and Hong Kong in the 2010s; the cause had not been established as of 2018. Cases were also reported to be increasing after the easing of restrictions due to the COVID pandemic that started in 2020.

=== The Dick test ===
The Dick test, developed in 1924 by George F. Dick and Gladys Dick, was used to identify those susceptible to scarlet fever. The Dick test involved injecting a diluted strain of the streptococci known to cause scarlet fever; a reaction in the skin at the injection site identified people susceptible to developing scarlet fever. The reaction could be seen four hours after the injection, but was more noticeable after 24 hours. If no reaction was seen in the skin, then the person was assumed not to be at risk from the disease, having developed immunity to it. This was widely considered a major therapeutic breakthrough, and it brought the Dicks significant celebrity, including a nomination for the Nobel Prize.

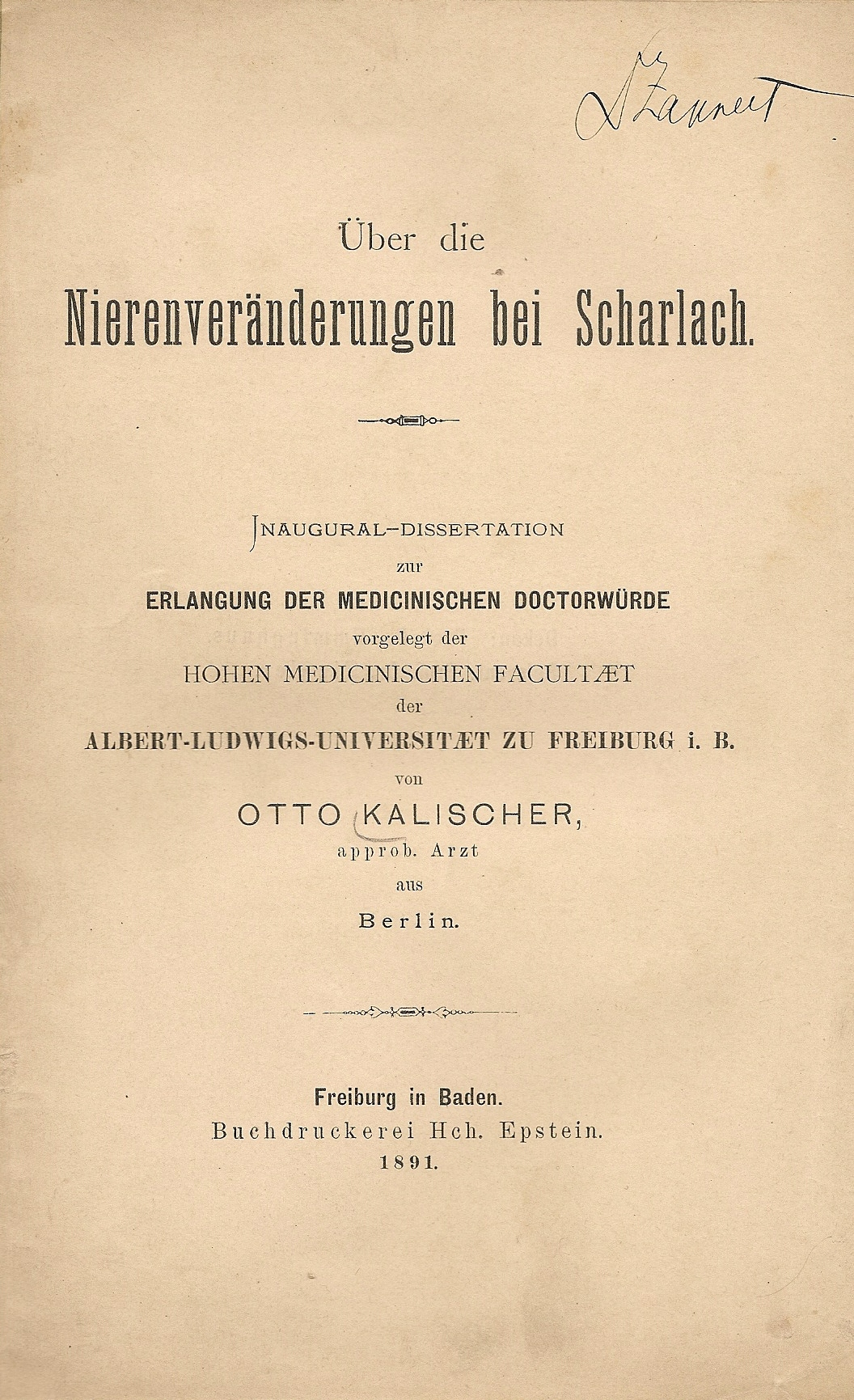
Otto Kalischer wrote a doctoral thesis on scarlet fever in 1891.

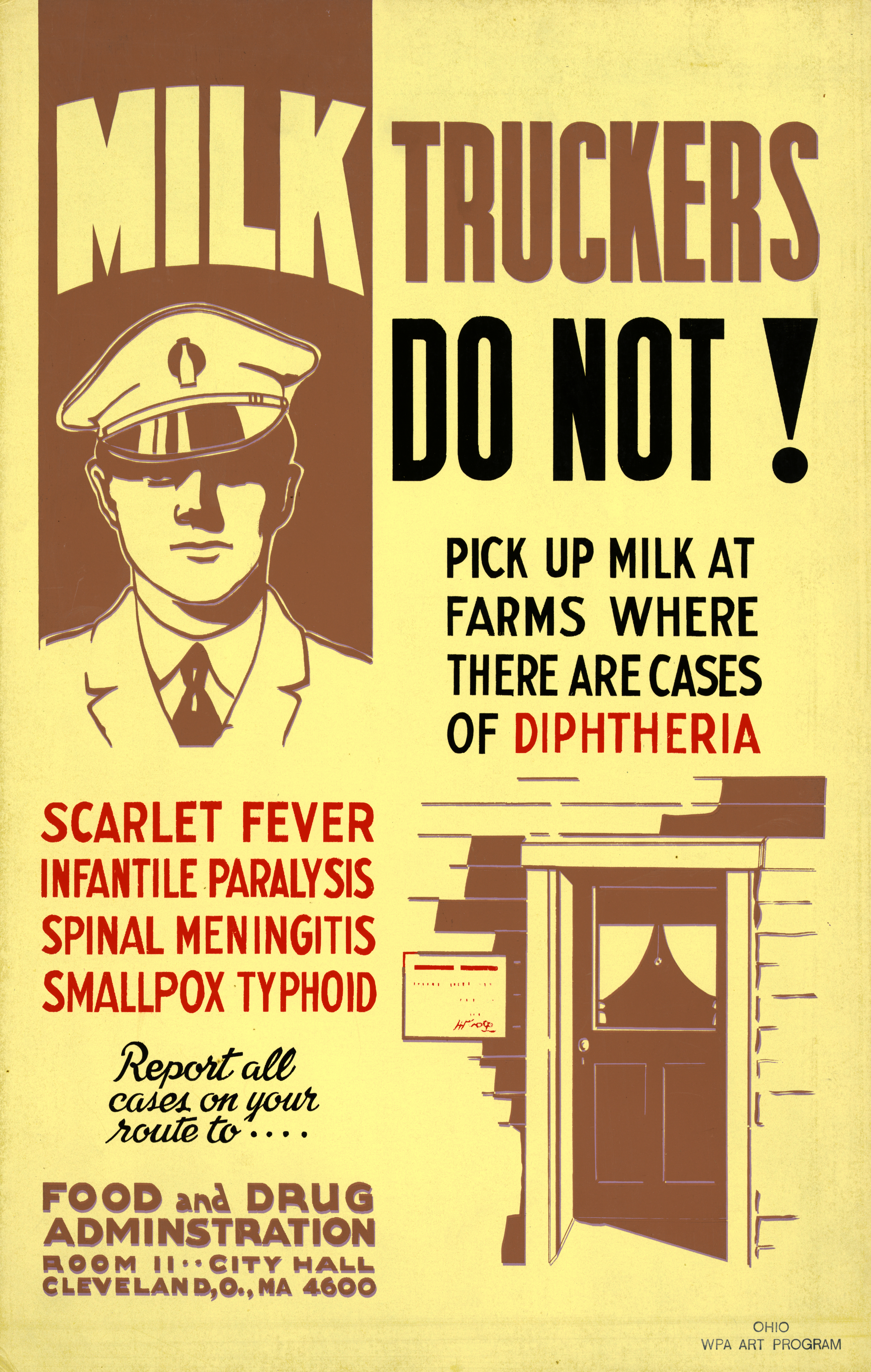
A 1930s American poster attempting to curb the spread of such diseases as scarlet fever by regulating milk supply

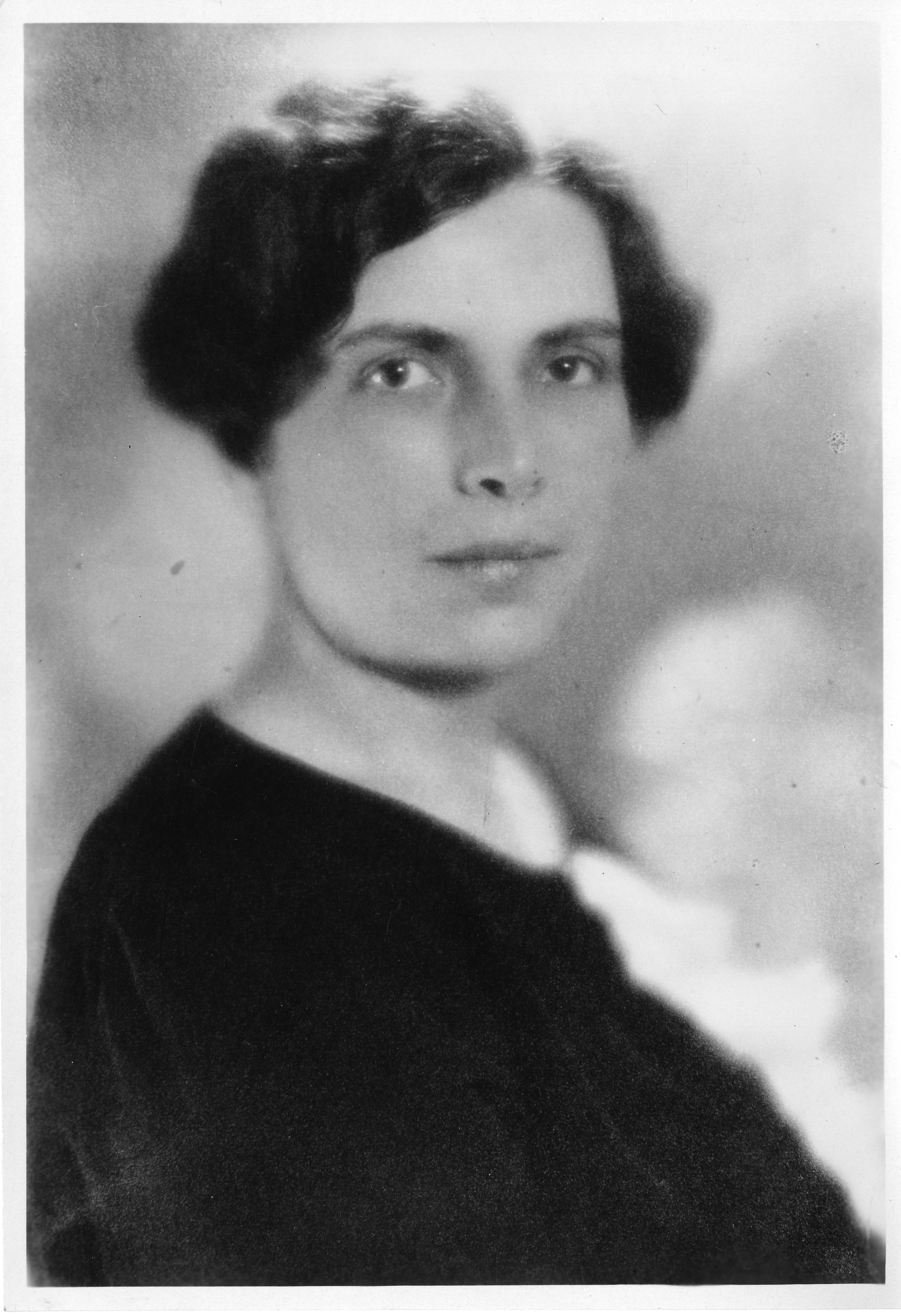
Gladys Henry Dick (pictured) and George Frederick Dick developed an antitoxin and vaccine for scarlet fever in 1924 which were later eclipsed by penicillin in the 1940s.
