= Sore throat =

Pain of the throat

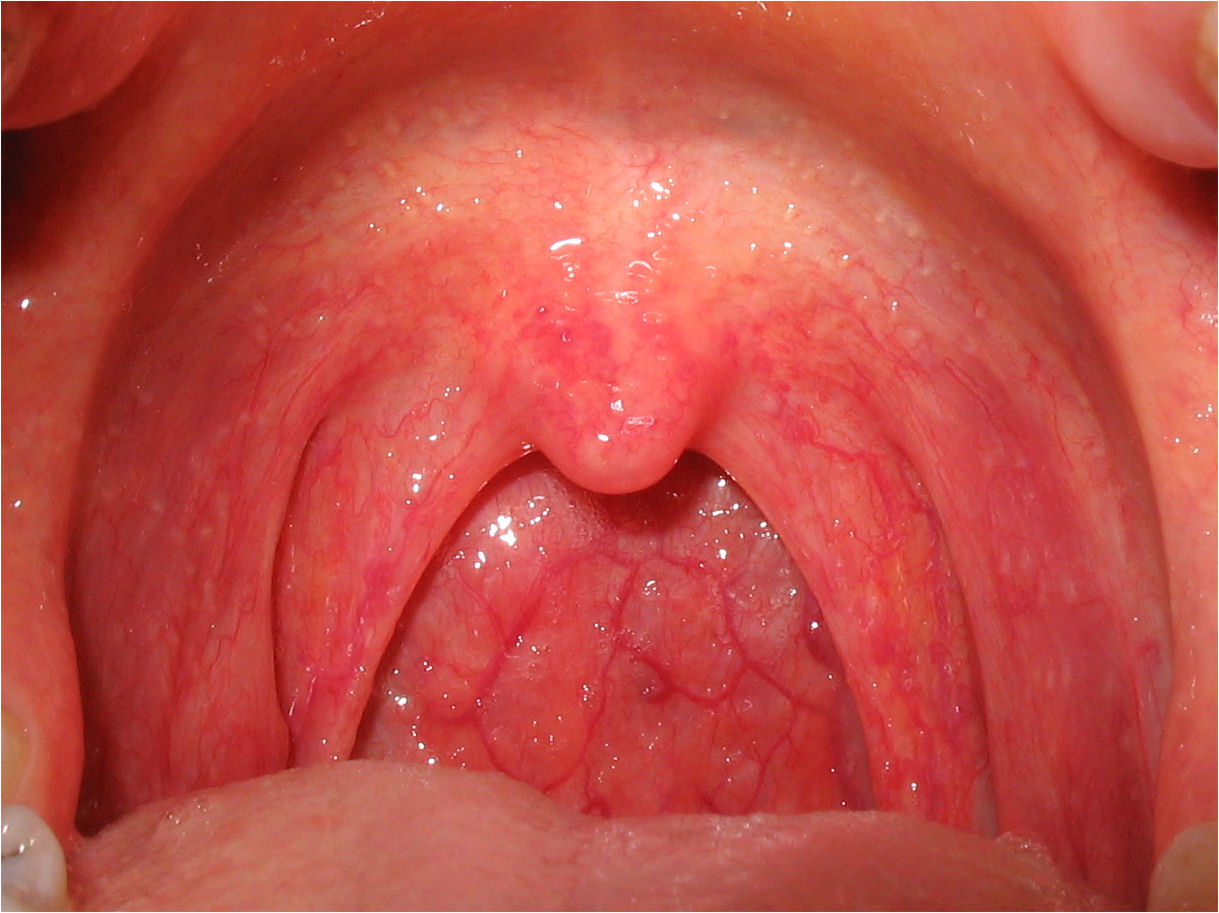
- Pharyngitis—inflammation of the back of the throat—caused by a virus is the most common cause of a sore throat.

Sore throat, also known as throat pain, is pain or irritation of the throat. The majority of sore throats are caused by a virus, for which antibiotics are not helpful.

For sore throat caused by bacteria (GAS), treatment with antibiotics may help the person get better faster, reduce the risk that the bacterial infection spreads, prevent retropharyngeal abscesses and quinsy, and reduce the risk of other complications such as rheumatic fever and rheumatic heart disease. In most developed countries, post-streptococcal diseases have become far less common. For this reason, awareness and public health initiatives to promote minimizing the use of antibiotics for viral infections have become the focus.

Approximately 35% of childhood sore throats and 5–25% of cases in adults are caused by a bacterial infection from group A streptococcus. Sore throats that are "non-group A streptococcus" are assumed to be caused by a viral infection. Sore throat is a common reason for people to visit their primary care doctors and the top reason for antibiotic prescriptions by primary care practitioners such as family doctors. In the United States, about 1% of all visits to the hospital emergency department, physician office and medical clinics, and outpatient clinics are for sore throat (over 7 million visits for adults and 7 million visits for children per year).

== Causes ==
Causes of sore throat include:

- viral infections
- group A streptococcal infection (GAS) bacterial infection
- allergies
- smoking or exposure to secondhand smoke
- muscle strains and conditions
- sexually transmitted diseases such as chlamydia and gonorrhea

== Definition ==
A sore throat is pain felt anywhere in the throat.

== Symptoms ==
Symptoms of sore throat include:

- a scratchy sensation
- pain during swallowing
- discomfort while speaking
- burning sensation
- swelling in the neck

== Diagnosis ==
The most common cause (80%) is acute viral pharyngitis, a viral infection of the throat. Other causes include other bacterial infections (such as group A streptococcus or streptococcal pharyngitis), trauma, and tumors. Gastroesophageal (acid) reflux disease can cause stomach acid to back up into the throat and also cause the throat to become sore. In children, streptococcal pharyngitis is the cause of 35–37% of sore throats.

The symptoms of a viral infection and a bacterial infection may be very similar. Some clinical guidelines suggest that the cause of a sore throat is confirmed prior to prescribing antibiotic therapy and only recommend antibiotics for children who are at high risk of non-suppurative complications. A group A streptococcus infection can be diagnosed by throat culture or a rapid test:

- In order to perform a throat culture, a sample from the throat (obtained by swabbing) is cultured (grown) on a blood agar plate to confirm the presence of group A streptococcus. Throat cultures are effective for people who have a low bacterial count (high sensitivity), however, throat cultures usually take about 48 hours to obtain the results.
- Rapid tests to detect GAS (bacteria) give a positive or negative result that is usually based on a colour change on a test strip that contains a throat swab (sample). Test strips detect a cell wall carbohydrate that is specific to GAS by using an immunologic reaction. Rapid testing can be performed in the doctor's office and usually takes 5–10 minutes for the test strip to indicate the result. Specificity for most rapid tests is approximately 95%, however sensitivity is about 85%. Although the use of rapid testing has been linked with an overall reduction in antibiotic prescriptions, further research is necessary to understand other outcomes such as safety, and when the person starts to feel better.

Clinicians often also make treatment decisions based on the person's signs and symptoms alone. In the US, approximately two-thirds of adults and half of children with sore throat are diagnosed based on symptoms and do not have testing for the presence of GAS to confirm a bacterial infection.

Numerous clinical scoring systems (decision tools) have also been developed to support clinical decisions. Scoring systems that have been proposed include Centor's, McIsaac's, and the feverPAIN. A clinical scoring system is often used along with a rapid test. The scoring systems use observed signs and symptoms in order to determine the likelihood of a bacterial infection.

== Management ==
Sore or scratchy throat can temporarily be relieved by gargling a solution of 1/4 to 1/2 teaspoon (1.3 to 2.5 milliliters) salt dissolved in an 8-US-fluid-ounce (240 ml) glass of water.

Pain medications such as non-steroidal anti-inflammatory drugs (NSAIDs) and paracetamol (acetaminophen) help in the management of pain. The use of corticosteroids seems to increase slightly the likelihood of resolution and the reduction of pain, but more analysis is necessary to ensure that this minimal benefit outweighs the risks. Antibiotics probably reduce pain, diminish headaches and could prevent some sore throat complications, but as these effects are small they must be balanced with the threat of antimicrobial resistance. It is not known whether antibiotics are effective for preventing recurrent sore throat.

There is only limited evidence that a hot drink can help alleviate a sore throat, and other common cold and influenza symptoms. If the sore throat is unrelated to a cold and is caused by, for example, tonsillitis, a cold drink may be helpful.

There are also other medications such as lozenges which can help soothe irritated tissues of the throat.

Without active treatment, symptoms usually last two to seven days in children.

== Statistics ==
In the United States, there are about 2.4 million emergency department visits with throat-related complaints per year.
