= Upper respiratory tract infection =

Infection of the nose, sinuses, pharynx, larynx or trachea

- Conducting passages
- Specialty: Infectious disease, Family medicine, Pediatrics, Otolaryngology
- Frequency: 12.8 billion cases (2021)

An upper respiratory tract infection (URTI) is an illness caused by an acute infection, which involves the upper respiratory tract, including the nose, sinuses, pharynx, larynx or trachea. This commonly includes nasal obstruction, sore throat, tonsillitis, pharyngitis, laryngitis, sinusitis, otitis media, and the common cold. Most infections are viral in nature, and in other instances, the cause is bacterial. URTIs can also be fungal or helminthic in origin, but these are less common.

== Classification ==
A URTI may be classified by the area inflamed. Rhinosinusitis or sinusitis affects the nose and paranasal sinuses, including frontal, ethmoid, maxillary, and sphenoid sinuses. Pharyngitis refers to inflammation of the pharynx and/or tonsils. Similarly, epiglottitis inflames the epiglottis and surrounding supraglottic tissues. Laryngitis affects the larynx and vocal cords.

== Signs and symptoms ==
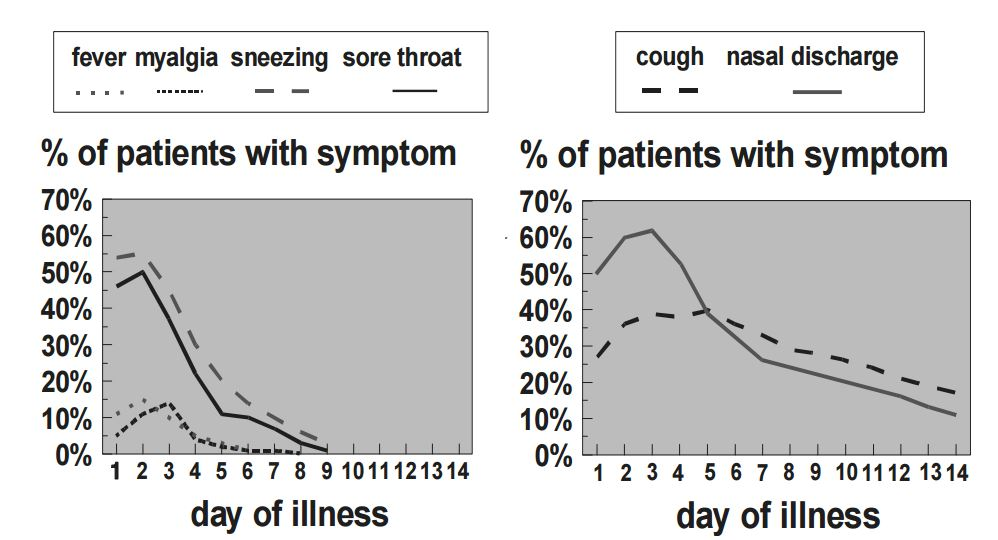
Time line for cold symptoms

URTIs commonly present with a constellation of symptoms, including cough, sore throat, runny nose, nasal congestion, headache, low-grade fever, facial pressure, and sneezing. Early manifestations often include sore throat, sneezing, and malaise, which may improve within several days. As the illness progresses, symptoms of nasal discharge and cough may appear.

Mucous discharge may turn to yellow or green shades, and it may also thicken. These are the natural course of a viral URTI. Most symptoms resolve within 7–10 days; however, cough can persist for several weeks in some individuals.

Group A beta-hemolytic streptococcal pharyngitis/tonsillitis (strep throat) typically presents with a sudden onset of sore throat, pain with swallowing, and fever. It is less commonly associated with a cough and nasal congestion.

== Cause ==
Most URTIs are viral in origin; however, certain presentations may be caused by bacteria.

Common viral pathogens include rhinovirus, adenovirus, influenza virus, parainfluenza, measles, respiratory syncytial virus (RSV), human metapneumovirus (HMPV), and coronaviruses such as SARS-CoV.

Transmission of viral URTIs occurs through respiratory droplets, airborne particles, or direct contact with contaminated surfaces. The transmission routes can also be affected by other variables such as environment, crowding, and host factors.

Up to 15% of acute pharyngitis cases may be caused by bacteria, most commonly Streptococcus pyogenes, a group A streptococcus in streptococcal pharyngitis ("strep throat"). Other bacterial causes include groups C and G beta-hemolytic streptococci and Corynebacterium diphtheriae. Sexually transmitted infections have also emerged as causes of oral and pharyngeal infections.

== Pathophysiology ==
In terms of pathophysiology, rhinovirus infection resembles the immune response. The viruses do not cause damage to the cells of the upper respiratory tract, but rather cause changes in the tight junctions of epithelial cells. This allows the virus to gain access to tissues under the epithelial cells and initiate the innate and adaptive immune responses.

Most symptoms of URTIs result from inflammatory mediators rather than viral injury itself. Nasal congestion occurs due to vasodilation of venous sinusoids within the nasal mucosa. Generalized symptoms such as headache, malaise, and muscle aches are mediated by the release of cytokines and prostaglandins during the immune response.

== Diagnosis ==
In most cases, URTIs are diagnosed clinically based on history and physical exam. Identification of the specific pathogen rarely alters management, except in circumstances where antibiotics or infection control is warranted.

Diagnostic testing may be considered in select patients depending on illness severity, examination findings, epidemiological factors, and global/local disease burden. When indicated, testing may include disease-specific rapid antigen detection tests or a viral respiratory panel.

Many respiratory infections present with overlapping symptoms, and distinguishing among them may require careful clinical evaluation. Listed below are three common infections with overlapping symptoms.

Seasonal allergies, Common Cold, Influenza: Symptom Comparison
Symptoms	Allergy	Common Cold (an URTI)	Influenza (Flu)
Itchy, watery eyes	Common	Rare (conjunctivitis may occur with adenovirus)	Soreness behind eyes, sometimes conjunctivitis
Nasal discharge	Common	Common	Common
Nasal congestion	Common	Common	Sometimes
Sneezing	Very common	Very common	Sometimes
Sore throat	Sometimes (post-nasal drip)	Very common	Sometimes
Cough	Sometimes	Common (mild to moderate, hacking)	Common (dry cough, can be severe)
Headache	Uncommon	Rare	Common
Fever	Never	Rare in adults, possible in children	Very common 37.8–38.9 °C (100–102 °F)(or higher in young children), lasting 3–4 days; may have chills
Malaise	Sometimes	Sometimes	Very common
Fatigue, weakness	Sometimes	Sometimes	Very common (can last for weeks, extreme exhaustion early in the course)
Muscle pain	Never	Slight	Very common (often severe)

== Prevention ==
Vaccination plays an important role in reducing the burden of certain upper respiratory infections. Immunization against influenza viruses, measles, Streptococcus pneumoniae, Haemophilus influenzae, and Bordetella pertussis can reduce the incidence or severity of associated respiratory infections.

Non-pharmacologic measures, particularly hand hygiene, are also effective in limiting transmission.

== Treatment ==
Upper respiratory infections deaths per million persons in 2012: 0 1 2 3–29

Treatment comprises symptomatic support usually via analgesics for headache, sore throat, and muscle aches. Moderate exercise in sedentary subjects with a naturally acquired URTI probably does not alter the overall severity and duration of the illness. No randomized trials have been conducted to ascertain benefits of increasing fluid intake.

=== Antibiotics ===
Although most URTIs are viral and self-limiting, antibiotics are frequently overprescribed. Unnecessary antibiotic use contributes to antimicrobial resistance, increased healthcare costs, and possible adverse drug reactions.

Health authorities have been strongly encouraging physicians to decrease the prescribing of antibiotics to treat common URTIs because antibiotic usage does not significantly reduce recovery time for these viral illnesses. Decreased antibiotic usage may help prevent drug-resistant bacteria. A 2017 systematic review found three interventions which were probably effective in reducing antibiotic use for acute respiratory infections: C-reactive protein testing, procalcitonin-guided management, and shared decision-making between physicians and patients. Others have advocated a delayed antibiotic approach to treating URTIs, which seeks to reduce the consumption of antibiotics while attempting to maintain patient satisfaction. A Cochrane review of 11 studies and 3,555 participants explored antibiotics for respiratory tract infections. It compared delaying antibiotic treatment to either starting them immediately or to no antibiotics. Outcomes were mixed depending on the respiratory tract infection; symptoms of acute otitis media and sore throat were modestly improved with immediate antibiotics, with minimal difference in complication rate. Antibiotic usage was reduced when antibiotics were only used for ongoing symptoms and maintained patient satisfaction at 86%. In a trial involving 432 children with a URTI, amoxicillin was no more effective than placebo, even for children with more severe symptoms such as fever or shortness of breath.

Prescribing antibiotics for laryngitis is not a suggested practice either. The antibiotics penicillin V and erythromycin are not effective for treating acute laryngitis. Erythromycin may improve voice disturbances after a week and cough after 2 weeks, but any modest subjective benefit is not greater than the adverse effects, cost, and the risk of bacteria developing resistance to the antibiotics.

While not recommended for viral URTIs, antibiotic usage is supported in most bacterial URTI cases, such as acute otitis media, group A beta-hemolytic streptococcal pharyngitis, epiglottitis, and a small percentage of rhinosinusitis cases. In children with acute otitis media, amoxicillin is the first-line treatment. Treatment of group A beta-hemolytic streptococcal pharyngitis includes penicillin V or amoxicillin. For acute bacterial sinusitis, guidelines recommend targeting likely organisms with amoxicillin or amoxicillin/clavulanate and using the shortest effective treatment duration. Imaging is generally reserved for recurrent, severe, or unclear cases.

=== Cough medicine ===
There is limited evidence supporting the effectiveness of over-the-counter cough medications for reducing coughing in adults or children. In addition, according to the American Academy of Pediatrics, the use of cough medicine to relieve cough symptoms should be avoided in children under 4 years old, and the safety is questioned for children under 6 years old.

==== Decongestants ====
Disability-adjusted life year for URTIs per 100,000 inhabitants in 2002: no data less than 10 10–30 30–60 60–90 90–120 120–150 150–180 180–210 210–240 240–270 270–300 more than 300

According to a Cochrane review, a single oral dose of nasal decongestant in the common cold is modestly effective for the short-term relief of congestion in adults; however, data on the use of decongestants in children are insufficient. Therefore, decongestants are not recommended for use in children under 12 years of age with the common cold. Oral decongestants are also contraindicated in patients with hypertension, coronary artery disease, and history of bleeding strokes.

==== Mucolytics ====
Mucolytics such as N-acetylcysteine, ambroxol, carbocystine, and bromhexine may help reduce viscosity and provide symptomatic relief in some patients. Acetylcysteine is considered to be safe for children older than 2 years.

=== Alternative medicine ===
The use of vitamin C in the inhibition and treatment of upper respiratory infections has been suggested since the initial isolation of vitamin C in the 1930s. Evidence regarding the use of vitamin C in these capacities remains mixed; however, some studies suggest that when vitamin C is taken prophylactically, it can reduce the duration of the common cold by 8% in adults and 13% in children. Other studies have also shown that vitamin C supplementation can decrease severe forms of the common cold by 15%.

Zinc supplementation has been shown in some studies to reduce symptom duration in adults by 2 days. The effects on symptom severity are less consistent.

Cool mist humidifiers, sterile saline nasal drops, and sprays can help alleviate symptoms in some people.

Honey can reduce cough symptoms; however, honey should not be given to children under age 1 due to the risk of developing botulism.

== Complications ==
Potential complications include: sinusitis, ear infection, mastoiditis, and progression to lower respiratory tract infection.

== Epidemiology ==
URTIs represent the most common infectious illnesses worldwide. Global burden studies estimate billions of cases annually, with significant variation by year and region.

Due to the high frequency of these infections, URTIs contribute substantially to healthcare utilization, school and workplace absenteeism, and economic burden globally.

Seasonal patterns are also well established. The common cold is more prevalent in the fall and spring, whereas RSV, influenza, and certain coronaviruses typically peak during the winter months.

Children under the age of five are most likely to be affected by URTIs globally. Children typically have two to nine viral respiratory illnesses per year.

== Dietary research ==
Weak evidence suggests that probiotics may be better than a placebo or no treatment for preventing upper respiratory tract infections.

== See also ==
- Respiratory tract infection
