= Gladys Dick =

American microbiologist

Gladys Rowena Henry Dick
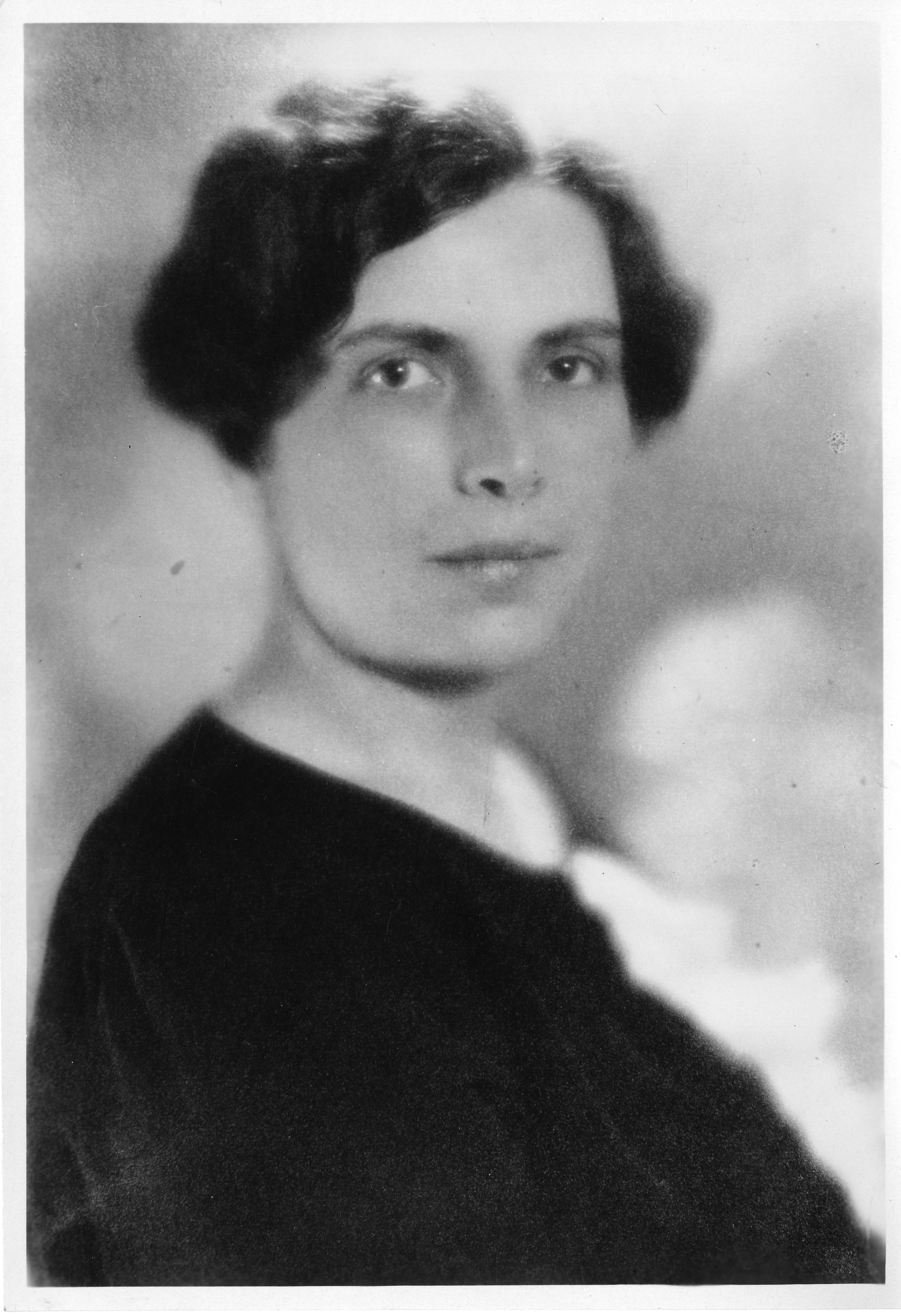
- Dick in 1927
- Born: Gladys Rowena Henry; December 18, 1881; Pawnee City, Nebraska, US
- Died: August 21, 1963 (aged 81); Palo Alto, California, US
- Education: University of Nebraska, Johns Hopkins University School of Medicine, University of Berlin
- Known for: Scarlet Fever Vaccine
- Spouse: George F. Dick
- Awards: Cameron Prize for Therapeutics of the University of Edinburgh (1933)
- Scientific career
- Fields: microbiology
- Workplaces: University of Chicago, Evanston Hospital, John R. McCormick Institute for Infectious Diseases, St. Luke's Hospital

Gladys Rowena Henry Dick (December 18, 1881 – August 21, 1963) was an American physician who co-developed an antitoxin and vaccine for scarlet fever with her husband, George F. Dick.

== Biography ==
Gladys Rowena Henry was born in Pawnee City, Nebraska in 1881 and earned her B.S. in zoology from the University of Nebraska in 1900. She was a member of the Pi Beta Phi chapter at the University of Nebraska. Because her mother initially objected to Gladys attending medical school, she took graduate classes at Nebraska until 1903, then moved to Baltimore to attend Johns Hopkins University School of Medicine. Graduating in 1907 with her M.D., she then trained for a year at the University of Berlin. Dick's years at Johns Hopkins and Berlin "marked her introduction to biomedical research" and provided opportunities to study experimental cardiac surgery and blood chemistry with Harvey Cushing, W.G. MacCallum, and Milton Winternitz.

Dick moved to Chicago in 1911 and contracted scarlet fever while working at Children's Memorial Hospital. After recovering, she took a research position at the University of Chicago, where she studied kidney pathochemistry with H. Gideon Wells and the etiology of scarlet fever with her future husband, George F. Dick. After they married in 1914, Dick served as a pathologist at Evanston Hospital and later joined her husband at the John R. McCormick Institute for Infectious Diseases. She also served as a bacteriologist for the United States Public Health Service and worked at St. Luke's Hospital.

In October 1923, Dick and her husband successfully isolated hemolytic streptococcus "as the causative agent of scarlet fever," and later developed the Dick test, a skin test which determined a person's susceptibility to the disease and produced "active immunization by larger doses of toxin and antitoxin for treatment, prevention, and diagnosis". They patented their toxin and antitoxin production methods in 1924 and 1926, which produced criticism from the medical field. The Dicks argued that the patents maintained quality control and ultimately won a lawsuit against the Lederle Laboratories in 1930 for "patent infringement and improper toxin manufacture."

Though the Dicks' antitoxin and vaccine were superseded by penicillin in the 1940s, their work was recognized by a Charles Mickle Fellowship Award from the University of Toronto in 1926, and the Cameron Prize for Therapeutics of the University of Edinburgh in 1933. Through the 1940s and 1950s, Dick was active in polio research and became an advocate for adoption, founding the Cradle Society in Evanston, IL and serving on its board from 1918 until 1953. She also devised the Dick Aseptic Nursery Technique which provided "strict sterilization and aseptic procedures" to prevent cross infection among infants.

Dick died of stroke in Palo Alto, California on August 21, 1963.
