= George Frederick Dick =

American physician and bacteriologist (1881–1967)

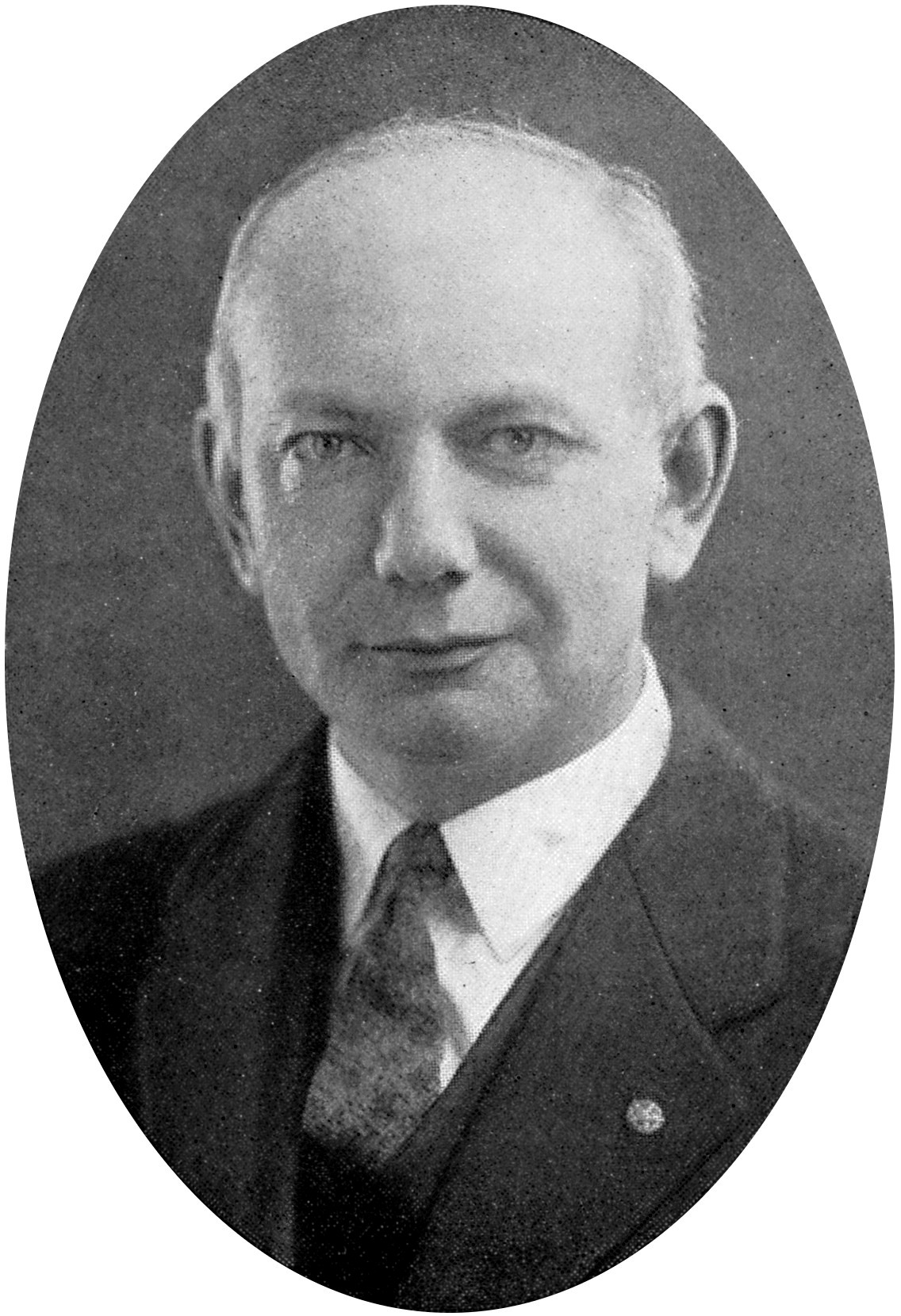
- Born: July 21, 1881; Ft. Wayne, Indiana, US
- Died: October 10, 1967 (aged 86); Palo Alto, California, US
- Known for: scarlet fever
- Spouse: Gladys Rowena Henry Dick
- Awards: Cameron Prize for Therapeutics of the University of Edinburgh (1933)
- Scientific career
- Fields: bacteriology
- Workplaces: Rush Medical College, Chicago

George Frederick Dick (July 21, 1881 – October 10, 1967) was an American physician and bacteriologist best known for his work with scarlet fever.

Dick studied scarlet fever whilst serving the Army Medical Corps during World War I. Dick continued with his research into scarlet fever following the war, and in 1923, in collaboration with his wife Gladys Rowena Dick, managed to locate the cause of the disease in a toxin produced by a strain of Streptococcus bacteria. Using this, they were able to create an antitoxin for treatment and a non-toxic vaccine for immunization. In 1933, Dick and his wife were awarded the Cameron Prize for Therapeutics of the University of Edinburgh.

He was a professor of clinical medicine at Rush Medical College, Chicago (1918–33), and then became the head of the department of medicine at the University of Chicago (1933–45).
