= Gargling =

Bubbling a liquid in one's mouth

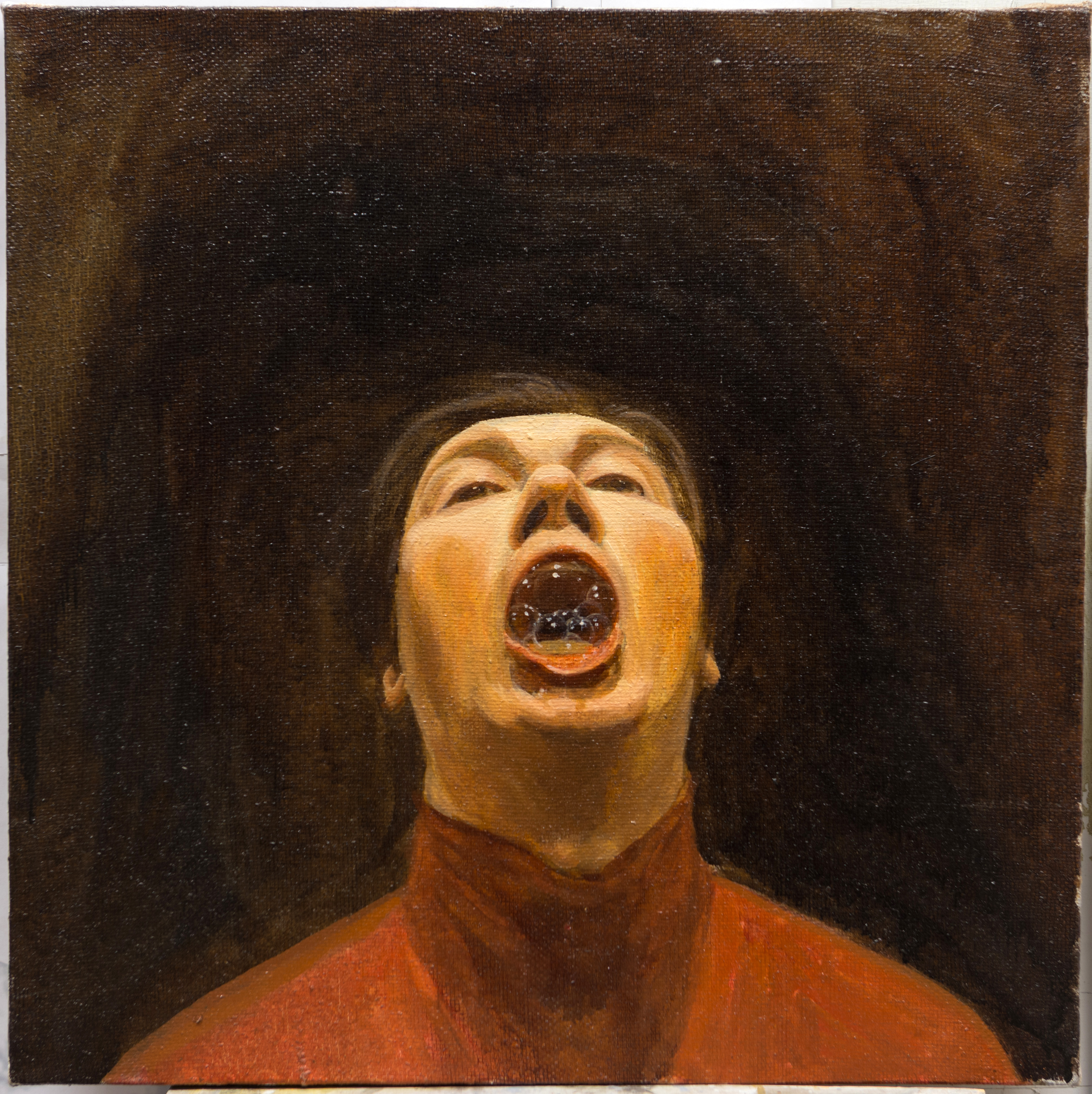
Gargling by Pavel Otdelnov

Gargling is the act of bubbling liquid in the mouth. It is also the washing of one's throat with a liquid (with one's head tipped back) that is kept from being swallowed by continuous exhalation. This produces a characteristic gurgling sound. Mouthwash or hydrogen peroxide (in a low concentration) is often employed.

A traditional home remedy of gargling warm saltwater is sometimes recommended to soothe a sore throat.

One study in Japan has shown that gargling water a few times a day will lower the chance of upper respiratory infections such as common colds, though some medical doctors are skeptical.

== See also ==
- Stomach rumble
