= Throat culture =

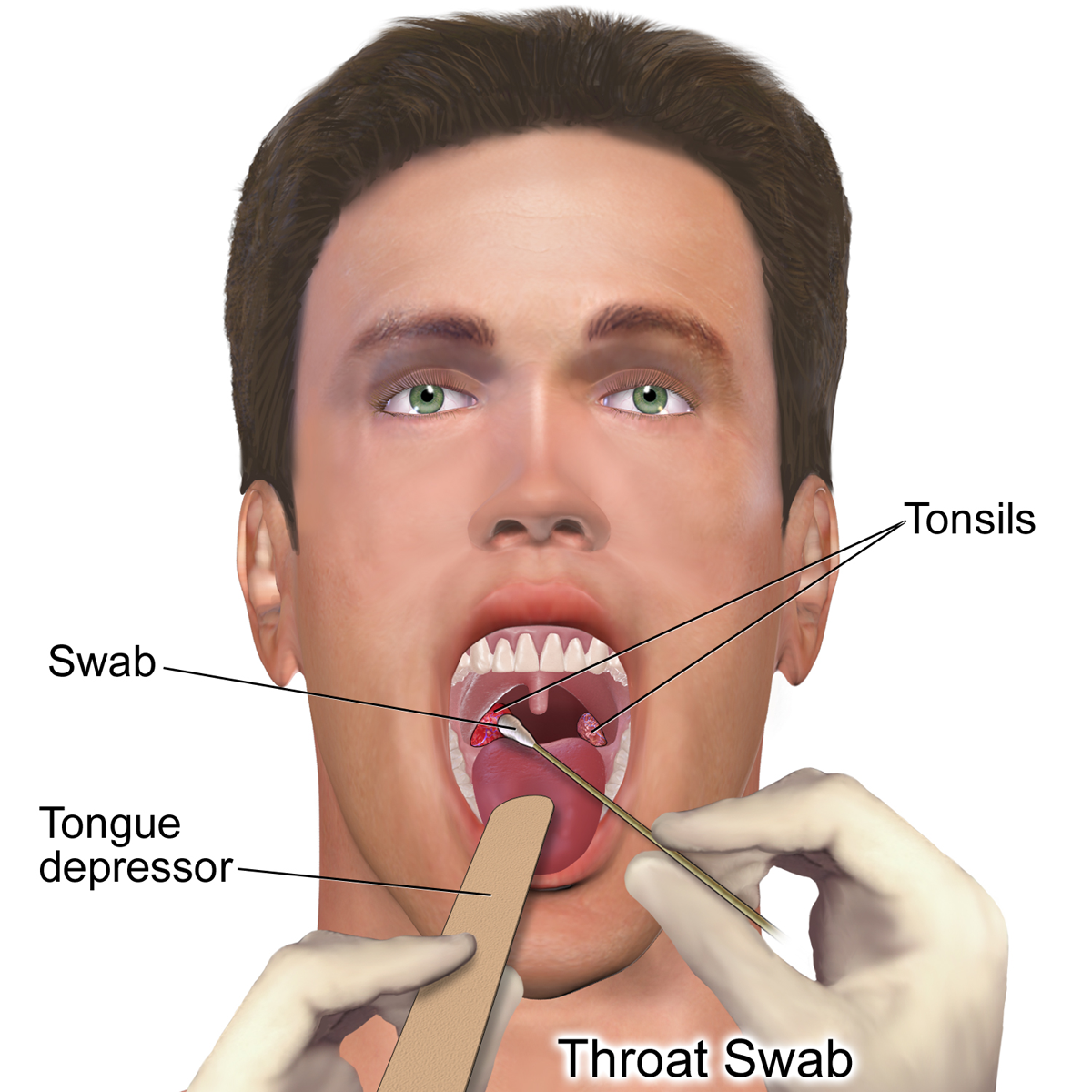
- Purpose: Diagnose bacteria or fungal infection in throat

A throat culture is a laboratory diagnostic test that evaluates for the presence of a bacterial or fungal infection in the throat. A sample from the throat is collected by swabbing the throat and placing the sample into a special cup (culture) that allows infections to grow. If an organism grows, the culture is positive and the presence of an infection is confirmed. The type of infection is found using a microscope, chemical tests, or both. If no infection grows, the culture is negative. Common infectious organisms tested for by a throat culture include Candida albicans, known for causing thrush, and Group A streptococcus, known for causing strep throat, scarlet fever, and rheumatic fever. Throat cultures are more sensitive (81% sensitive) than the rapid strep test (70%) for diagnosing strep throat, but are nearly equal in terms of specificity.

== Purpose ==
A throat culture may be done to investigate the cause of a sore throat. Most sore throats are caused by viral infections. However, in some cases the cause of a sore throat may be unclear and a throat culture can be used to determine if the infection is bacterial. Identifying the responsible organism can guide treatment.

== Technique ==
The person receiving the throat culture is asked to tilt his or her head back and open his or her mouth. The health professional will press the tongue down with a tongue depressor and examine the mouth and throat. A clean swab will be rubbed over the back of the throat, around the tonsils, and over any red areas or sores to collect a sample.

The sample may also be collected using a throat washout. For this test, the patient will gargle a small amount of salt water and then spit the fluid into a clean cup. This method gives a larger sample than a throat swab and may make the culture more reliable.

A culture for Streptococcus pyogenes can take 18–24 hours when grown at 37 degrees Celsius (body temperature).

== See also ==
- Antibiogram
- Bacterial culture
- Laboratory specimen
- Rapid strep test
