= Chronic cough =

Long-term coughing

In clinical guidelines chronic cough is defined as a cough lasting more than 8 weeks in adults and more than 4 weeks in children. Some consensus statements suggest that a chronic cough must persist upwards of three months or more to be considered chronic. The prevalence of chronic cough is about 10% although the prevalence may differ depending on definition and geographic area. Chronic cough is a common symptom in several different respiratory diseases like COPD or pulmonary fibrosis but in non-smokers with a normal chest x-ray chronic cough are often associated with asthma, rhinosinusitis, and gastroesophageal reflux disease or could have no specific cause known (idiopathic). Generally, a cough, for example after an upper respiratory tract infection, lasts around one to two weeks; however, chronic cough can persist for an extended period of time, several years in some cases. The current theory about the cause of chronic cough, independent of associated condition, is that it is caused by a hypersensitivity in the cough sensory nerves, called cough hypersensitivity syndrome. There are a number of treatments available, depending on the associated disease but the clinical management of the patients remains a challenge. Risk factors include exposure to cigarette smoke, and exposure to pollution, especially particulates.

== Signs and symptoms ==
Common symptoms present in chronic cough is allotussia, a cough triggered by innocuous stimuli such as perfumes or talking and hypertussia, an increased sensitivity to known tussive triggers like smoke or fumes. Laryngeal paraesthesia, irritation, tickle or lump in the throat, is also common. Other symptoms includes frequent throat clearing and sore throat, hoarseness, wheezing or shortness of breath. If the chronic cough is associated with rhinosinusitis or reflux, symptoms may also include a runny or stuffy nose, a feeling of liquid running down the back of the throat (postnasal drip), heartburn or sour taste in a person's mouth, and in rare cases coughing blood. Most patients with chronic cough have hypersensitivity of the cough reflex, such as the Arnold's nerve reflex.

=== Complications ===
Long-term coughing and constant irritation of the upper airway can be problematic for individuals who have chronic cough. Due to the consistent coughing, this can interfere with an individual's daily life. This interference can thus cause additional problems such as affecting a person's ability to ensure a consistent sleep, daytime fatigue, difficulty concentrating at work or school, headache, and dizziness. Other more severe but rare complications include fainting, urinary incontinence, and broken ribs, caused by excessive coughing.

== Causes ==
Possible causes, alone or in conjunction, that produce the chronic cough include the following.

- Postnasal drip, when excess mucus is produced in the sinus of the nose and drips back towards the throat, causes a cough reflex, also known as upper airway cough syndrome. Postnasal drip coughing can be caused by the direct irritation of the postnasal drip or by inflammation of cough receptors in the upper airway. Postnasal drip cases contribute 34% of chronic cough cases.
- Asthma that affects the upper respiratory tract. Other causes such as cold air or breathing in chemicals can also induce coughing.
- Gastroesophageal reflux disease (GERD), a common condition where the backflow of stomach acid between the throat and the stomach causes irritation, can lead to chronic cough.
- Infections such as pneumonia, flu, common cold, tuberculosis or other infections in the upper respiratory tract often include coughing that can persist even after the infection has subsided. Chronic cough is commonly mistaken as a symptom of the infection known as whooping cough.
- Blood pressure drugs such as angiotensin-converting enzyme, which is commonly prescribed to individuals with high blood pressure and cardiac failure, are known to have a side effect of chronic cough.
- Chronic bronchitis, an inflammation in the major airways such as the bronchial tubules, causes the coughing of coloured sputum. Most carriers of chronic bronchitis have a history of smoking. Chronic bronchitis is on a spectrum of smoking-related lung disease also known as chronic obstructive pulmonary disease (COPD). Other lung diseases on the spectrum such as emphysema can co-exist with COPD. It accounts for 5% of chronic cough.
- Chemical irritants, such as cigarette smoke, are a common factor that can lead to chronic cough. These irritants typically contribute towards chronic bronchitis.
- Other notable rare causes include aspiration, bronchiectasis, bronchiolitis, cystic fibrosis, laryngopharyngeal reflux, lung cancer, non-asthmatic eosinophilic bronchitis, sarcoidosis.

== Risk factors ==
Life style related factors, some health conditions or diseases, and environmental exposures can put people at risk for developing a chronic cough. Life-style risk factors include smoking cigarettes that the individual smokes themselves or breathes from second-hand exposure. Long-term exposure to smoke can irritate airways and lead to chronic cough and in severe cases lung damage. Other risk factors include exposure to polluted air. Individuals who work in factories or laboratories that deal with chemicals have a chance of developing chronic cough from long-term exposure.

== Mechanism ==
Coughing is a mechanism of the body that is essential to the normal physiological function of clearing the throat, which involves a reflex of the afferent sensory limb, central processing centre of the brain, and the efferent limb. With the body components involved, sensory receptors are also used. These receptors include rapidly adapting receptors which respond to mechanical stimuli, slowly adapting receptors, and nociceptors which respond to chemical stimuli such as hormones in the body. To start the reflex, the afferent impulses are transmitted to the medulla of the brain; this stimulus is then interpreted. The efferent impulses are then triggered by the medulla, causing the signal to travel down the larynx and bronchial tree. This then triggers a cascade of events that involve the intercostal muscles, abdominal wall, diaphragm and pelvic floor, which together create the reflex known as coughing.

== Diagnosis ==
There are three main types of chronic cough.

- Upper airway cough syndrome is the most common cause of chronic coughing. It is diagnosed when the secretion of excess mucus from the nose or sinus drains into the pharynx or the back of the throat, causing an induced cough.
- Asthma is a main way to produce the chronic cough. This is due to the airflow being obstructed when coughing, causing a shortness of breath, wheezing, dyspnea and coughing.
- Gastroesophageal reflux disease (GERD) is identified with two mechanisms, which are the distal esophageal acid stimulating the esophageal-treachebronchial cough reflex due to the vagus nerve, and the microbial esophageal contents of the pharynx and tracheobronchial causing a cough reflex.

=== Imaging ===
- X-rays are used to check for lung cancer, pneumonia and other lung diseases that are contributing to the chronic cough. X-rays of the sinus also can provide evidence of an infection in the area.
- CT scans are used to check the condition of the patient's lungs and to check sinus cavities for infections.
- Lung Function Test, a simple test in which the patient inhales and exhales into a spirometer, is normally used to diagnose asthma or chronic obstructive pulmonary disease.
- With lab tests, a sample of the patient's mucus is tested for bacteria
- Scope tests are used if the above tests are not able to diagnose the chronic cough. A special test may be used that involves a thin, flexible tube which contains a light and camera. This is inserted within the patient through the respiratory tract. A bronchoscope is used for seeing the lungs and air passages, and a biopsy of the linings of the airway may be taken. Additionally, a rhinoscope can be used to examine the upper airway tract.
- Children are typically diagnosed with chest X-rays or spirometry

Typical evaluation of chronic cough begins with diagnosing the person's lifestyle choices, such as smoking, environmental exposure or medication. From this doctors can opt to use chest radiography if the patient does not smoke, takes any angiotensin-converting enzyme inhibitor, or still has a persistent cough after the period of medication.

=== Concerning findings ===
A prolonged cough such as one that falls under the chronic cough syndrome can become a medical emergency. Concerning symptoms are a high fever, coughing of blood, chest pain, difficulty of breathing, appetite loss, excess mucus being coughed, fatigue, night sweats, and unexplained weight loss.

=== Types ===
By diagnosing which type of cough is present, individuals may further identify the cause of the chronic cough. These coughing types include the following. A dry cough is a persistent cough where no mucus is present; this can be a sign of an infection. A chronic wet cough is a cough where excess mucus is present; depending on the colour of the phlegm, bacterial infections may be present. A stress cough is when the airways of the throat are blocked to the point that it causes a reflexive spasm. A whooping cough is when a 'whooping' sound is present; this is a normally an indication of infection.

== Treatment ==
- Upper airway cough syndrome treatments include avoiding environmental irritants (chemicals) and offending antigens. This may involve treating the sinus with antibiotics to stop nasal drip. Individuals should avoid decongestants found in off-the-shelf pharmacies, to allow rhinitis medicaments to work. In severe cases where the cause is not clear, patients should use empirical therapy, which is a combination of antihistamine and decongestants. Results typically show within two weeks of therapy, but it can take up to several months for results to show. Absence of the standard clinical procedure that tests for rhinorrhea and excess sputum production should not preclude an empirical trial with antihistamine and decongestants, as they are not effective in treating upper airway cough syndrome.
- Treating children who have a non-specific chronic cough with asthma medications such as inhaled beta2-agonists (e.g., salbutamol) or inhaled corticosteroids does not improve the clinical symptoms.
- Codeine-based cough medications are contraindicated for children under 12 years old due to the risk of respiratory suppression and the potential for opioid toxicity.
- Leukotriene receptor antagonist-based medications and methylxanthines are not recommended for treating children with persistent non-specific cough.
- Gastroesophageal reflux disease (GERD) treatments can include intense monitoring with a dual channel 24-hour pH probe for diagnosis of the severity of GERD. Other monitors such as nasopharyngoscopy can reveal glottis changes associated with the refluxes that occur. Acid suppressive medications can be taken, which include histamine 2 (H2) blockers, proton pump inhibitors (PPI) and prokinetic agents. This medication tends to show results within two weeks; however six to eight weeks is ideal for conclusive results. Patients can remain on treatment for up to six months.
- Moderate levels of evidence suggest that the use of a clinical pathway that includes an evidence-based algorithm (flow chart) for treating children who have chronic cough may improve clinical outcomes.

There is insufficient evidence to determine if the following approaches are beneficial for treating chronic cough: Treating childhood obstructive sleep apnoea, modifying the indoor air quality, or treatment with inhaled chromones.

== Epidemiology ==
The prevalence of chronic cough in many communities in Europe and the U.S. is 9–33% of the population. Chronic cough is three times more common in those who smoke compared to people who never smoke. The most important risk factors for chronic cough are tobacco smoking and working in a dusty job. Exposure to tobacco smoke in a home environment is also a risk factor for children due to second-hand smoke inhalation. Other causes of chronic cough include higher particulate matter concentrations in air, related to increase cough and sore throat in children. An increase in nitrogen dioxide has also shown a rising association with chronic cough syndrome.

== Children ==
A cough that is four weeks or longer in duration is considered chronic for children. Most common causes for children include asthma, respiratory tract infections and GERD. An estimation of between one and 21% of children suffer from chronic cough. Causes typically diagnosed include viral bronchitis, post-infectious cough, cough-variant asthma, upper airway cough syndrome, psychogenic cough and GERD. Due to some diagnostic methods being invasive, typically children are not suitable for such diagnosis under the age of 15. However, the bare minimum tests include chest radiography and spirometry.

== See also ==
- Globus pharyngeus – "Lump in the throat" sensation
- Throat clearing – Sound made by a throat
