= Loogie =

The term loogie is typically used to refer to sputum, a mixture of phlegm and nasal mucus expectorated from the throat by coughing. It may also refer to:

- Hocking a loogie, inhaling hard to force nasal mucus to collect at the back of the throat, then spitting it out, typically resulting in a loud throat-clearing sound.
- Mucus
- Phlegm

== See also ==
- LOOGY (Left-handed One Out GuY), a left-handed specialist in baseball
