= Throat clearing =

Sound made by a throat

Throat clearing is forcibly, sometimes mutedly, expelling air from one's lungs, sometimes to clear mucus, sometimes to attract attention to something. It is less vigorous than coughing.

== Cause ==
Throat clearing may be articulated consciously or unconsciously, and may be a symptom of a number of conditions, as follows:

- Laryngopharyngeal (upper respiratory tract) ailments:
  - Common cold or post-nasal drip: The nose dispatches mucus which is meant to assist clearing infections and allergens. Mucus which is thick is forced out with a throat clearing sound.
  - Laryngopharyngeal reflux
- Tics as signs of any of various conditions, including anxiety disorders or Tourette syndrome

== Mechanism ==
Throat clearing is a sound made at the back of the throat. The act of clearing the throat causes the folds in the throat to vibrate similar to a cough so it may be harmful if it is continuously practiced.

== Onomatopoeia ==
When the pressure is restricted with a closed mouth, as is common in polite society, the sound is articulated as a single-syllable exclamation, written onomatopoeiacally as "hem"; or it may be articulated as a double-syllable sound, written as "ahem", which is expressed by inhaling slightly and then exhaling more forcibly. An alternate onomatopoeia written "hock" or "hawk" (as in "to hock a loogie") represents the impolite sound of loudly expelling a bolus of sputum with an open mouth.

== Paralanguage ==
A deliberately executed throat clearing can be a nonverbal, paralingual form of metacommunication. A loud, exaggerated throat-clearing noise may sometimes be used to get attention; as in the case of a parent signaling to a child that they should behave.

== See also ==
- Chronic cough – Long-term coughing
- Globus pharyngeus – "Lump in the throat" sensation
