= Habit cough =

Cough with no medical cause

A habit cough is a chronic cough that has no underlying organic cause or medical diagnosis, and does not respond to conventional medical treatment. This is sometimes called tic cough, somatic cough syndrome and previously psychogenic cough, but without clinical justification.

Different terms and conditions involving this form of chronic cough were ill-defined and not well distinguished.

Coughing may develop in children or adults after a cold or other airway irritant. Similar symptoms of habit cough have been reported in adults and may be the same disorder as is seen in children or adolescents.

== Classification and name ==
=== History ===
A medical textbook from 1685 by Thomas Willis, (1621-1675) described an adult woman with “a violent dry cough following her day and night, unless she was fallen asleep,” a description that would fit the habit cough diagnosis today. A 1694 medical book by Franciscus Mercurios (1614-1699), a Flemish physician, alchemist, kabbalist, and writer included in his book, The Spirit of Diseases: “...Habitual Cough, which often continues after the first cough, which was caused by the cold, is gone .... and the Habitual Cough often proceed.” Charles Creighton (1847–1927), a British physician and medical author, in an 1886 medical book, Illustrations of Unconscious Memory in Disease, described, "...a habit cough – a reflex effect persisting after the cause is gone .... or an acquired habit....” He went on to state, “...the treatment of it is to break the habit ....."

In the 19th century, habit cough was also referred to as "stomach cough".

In the 20th century, the terms habit cough, tic cough, psychogenic cough, somatic cough syndrome and somatic cough disorder have been used to describe a type of chronic cough in the absence of an identifiable medical disease that does not respond to conventional treatment. A psychological or psychiatric basis has been considered but not established.

=== Habit or tic cough ===
The ACCP (American College of Chest Physicians) suggested in 2015 that the name tic cough replace habit cough without any factual or clinical basis, even though there were no clinically apparent shared characteristics with tics and tic disorders.

Weinberger and Lockshin wrote in 2017: "However, our experience has found habit cough to fit the syndrome best, and has been most acceptable to the families in diagnosing and explaining the nature of the disorder."

== Symptoms ==
Habit cough is commonly characterized by a harsh barking cough, and can persist for weeks, months, and even years. The cough's hallmarks are severe frequency, sometimes a cough every 2–3 seconds, and the lack of other symptoms such as fever. The patient can have trouble falling asleep but once asleep will not cough. Absence once asleep is considered essential.

There are many causes of chronic cough. Habit cough is usually readily identified by its clinical presentation as a repetitive daily non-productive (dry) cough that is absent during sleep. People feel that the cough is different from ordinary coughs. The cough can vary in intensity, pattern, and frequency. The clinical characteristics bear little resemblance to other causes of cough. A chest x-ray and pulmonary function if the child can perform the test are generally sufficient to provide evidence for the absence of lung disease causing the cough.

== Treatment ==
Suggestion therapy was established in the 1966 publication of Bernard Berman, an allergist in Boston. He cured 6 children by "the art of suggestion" for which he suggested that the physician must have sound judgment, be aware of the patient's emotional makeup, be honest and forthright with the patient, establish rapport with the patient and parents, and understand the art of suggestion.

== Understanding and experience in the art of suggestion ==
Treatment has relied on suggesting to the patient that they can break the coughing habit themselves. This has been done by direct contact with the patient, by video conference, and by proxy where a video of suggestion therapy stopping cough is observed. Hypnosis has also been effective and may be particularly helpful when suggestion therapy is not effective.
