= Cricopharyngeal spasm =

- Specialty: Psychiatry, Otorhinolaryngology
- Duration: Several months
- Causes: Stress, anxiety

Cricopharyngeal spasms occur in the cricopharyngeus muscle of the pharynx. Cricopharyngeal spasm is an uncomfortable but harmless and temporary disorder.

== Signs and symptoms ==
- Sensation of a 'lump' in the back of the throat
- Throat feels swollen
- Discomfort - Lump can often feel quite big and pain is occasional
- Symptoms normally worse in the evening
- Stress aggravates the symptoms
- Saliva is difficult to swallow, yet food is easy to swallow - eating, in fact, often makes the tightness go away for a time
- 'Lump' sensation comes and goes from day to day
- Symptoms can persist for very long periods, often several months.
- The symptoms can be mimicked by pushing on the cartilage in the neck, just below the Adam's apple

== Physiology ==
There are two sphincters in the oesophagus. They are normally contracted and they relax when one swallows so that food can pass through them going to the stomach. They then squeeze closed again to prevent regurgitation of the stomach contents and prevent air from entering the digestive system. If this normal contraction becomes a spasm, these symptoms begin.

== Causes ==
Causes include stress and anxiety. Other causes are not yet clear.

The condition persists in the autonomic nervous system even when the original stress is relieved.

An assumption in psychiatry is that a lack of serotonin can be associated with depression and anxiety. A further assumption is that a low levels of serotonin can causes spasms in the cervical area. A plausible explanation for the cricopharyngeal spasms is a lack of neurotransmitter preventing the central nervous system from detecting that the eosophagus is closed, so that the upper esophagus sphincter becomes, randomly, hypertonic.

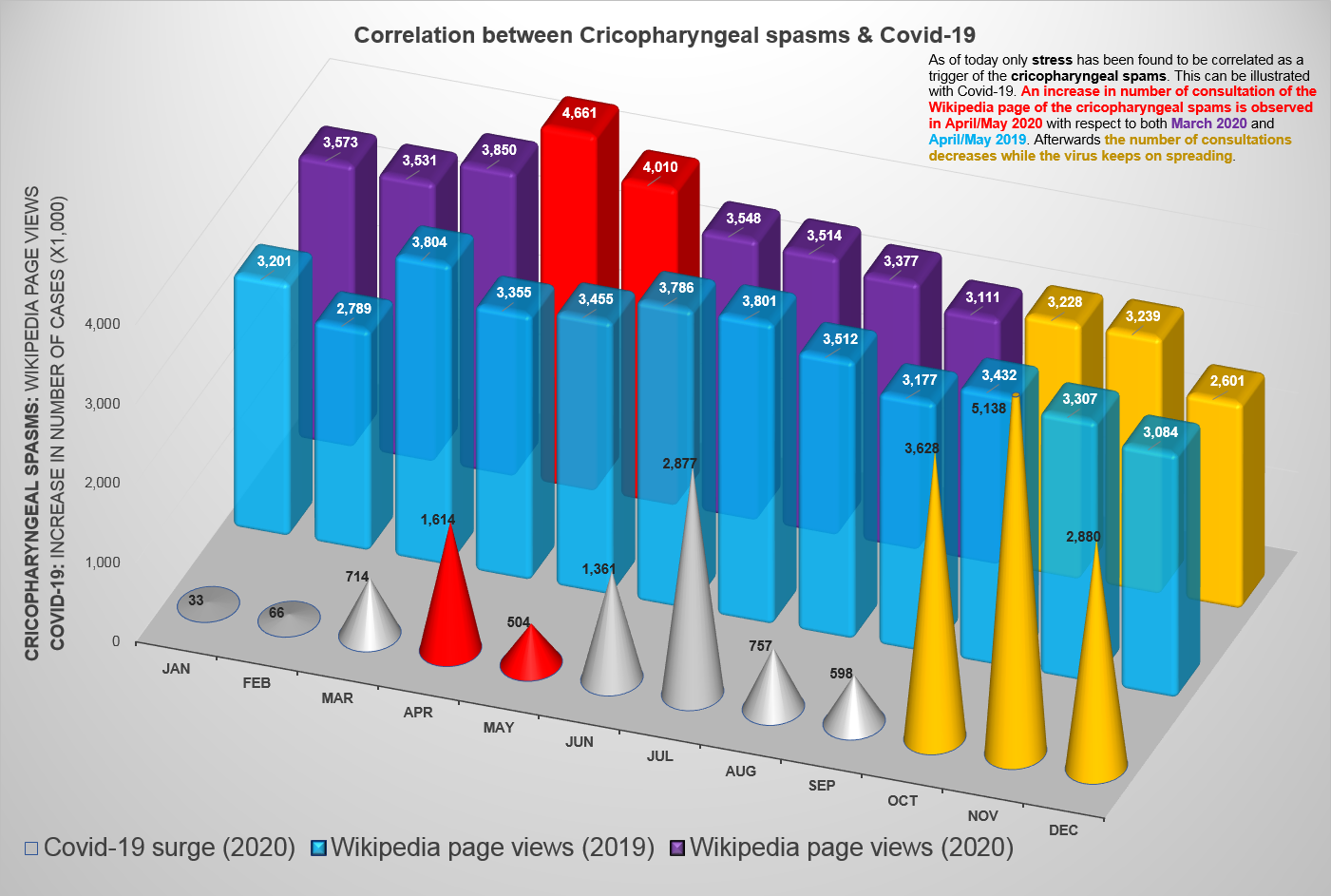
From this plot one can conclude that the virus is not causing the spasms, but well the stress induced by the situation.

The condition can appear as a symptom of the generalized anxiety disorder. Early signs are other symptoms like difficulty or inability to eat (loss of appetite, satiety after swallowing minor quantities), headache, dry mouth at night, sleeping issues, tremor, tension in the neck, in the throat, abdominal, stomach or chest pain etc. The sequence can result from a recent stress, panic attack or worry.

The subject heads to cricopharyngeal spasms when, for instance, eating pasty food requiring more throat cleanings, like peanuts, pumpkin seeds and other nuts, becomes painful. Continuous swallowing appears with the spasms as the brain interprets the feeling as something stuck.

The vagus nerves seems to play a role in the mother condition through a neurovegetative hyperactivity or dysautonomia. It innerves the inferior pharyngeal constrictor muscle where the cricopharyngeal spasms occur.

Throat spasms can also appear after an accident, a disease, may be caused or worsened by GERD. There may be hereditary factors.

In the context of long covid psychiatrists envisioned a potential relationship with an immune reaction, involving cytokines, that would persist quietly. However, due the anxiogenic situation, stress was again present when the symptoms started.

== Diagnosis ==
These spasms are frequently misunderstood by the patient to be cancer due to the 'lump in the throat' feeling (globus pharyngeus) that is symptomatic of this syndrome.

All the anatomic examinations can appear normal despite the condition. The throat endoscopy can objectify that nothing is stuck, that there is no lesion or inflammation. The barium swallow can miss that the sphincter is hypertonic if it does not happen during the examination, or if the sphincter still relaxes enough for the food bolus to go through. The esophageal manometry cannot detect any abnormal wave.

The cricopharyngeal spasms ("feeling that something is stuck") occur in the cricopharyngeal part of the inferior pharyngeal constrictor muscle, at the bottom of the throat. They cause muscle tension on the cricoid cartilage, leading to a globus feeling. Pharyngeal spasms, a more common source of a globus feeling, cause tension on the thyroid cartilage. They move up and down, left and right in the pharyngeal muscles. Both may be present.

The patient complains about the signs and symptoms enumerated above. The pain causes dry deglutition and dry deglutition adds to the pain, triggering a vicious circle. The spasms start after dry deglutition, after the meals or randomly during the day. They can start (and stop) brutally. Or softly, by the feeling that a small pill is stuck, frictions around it, then the impression that a ball is stuck. When the spasms last long they can give the impression of a knife stabbed in the throat.

The cricopharyngeal spasms can be, for instance, formally diagnosed as part of the more general condition. For instance, did the patient recently encounter other symptoms of the generalized anxiety disorder? Does the patient have neurovegetative symptoms? Are there symptoms of dysautonomia? Is there evidence of a lack of serotonin, like no sleep (melatonin is generated from serotonin)? Is there any other psychiatric condition?

Cricopharyngeal spasms remain a rare symptom. Difficulties for the patient to describe an unusual symptom and for the practitioners to figure out the condition can entail a prompt diagnosis.

== Treatment ==
The condition is known to be temporary. In some individuals it can disappear by itself without medication. For others, it can stagnate or worsen until appropriate medical care is given.

Since the problem can last, medical specialists are not readily available and potential treatments act slowly, patience is required. During that time, finding distractions and support is a first help. Attention should be paid to not increase the levels of stress and anxiety, or fall into depression because of the symptom or its root cause.

The medical specialists to consult are ENT specialist and psychiatrist:

- The ENT specialist to perform a throat examination (search for lesions, inflammation, signs of reflux, nerve issues, sinister causes etc.). Complementary examinations can also be prescribed.
- The psychiatrist to assess the root causes, elaborate an appropriate treatment and follow the progresses.

A cure for the condition exists and number of treatments may provide a relief.

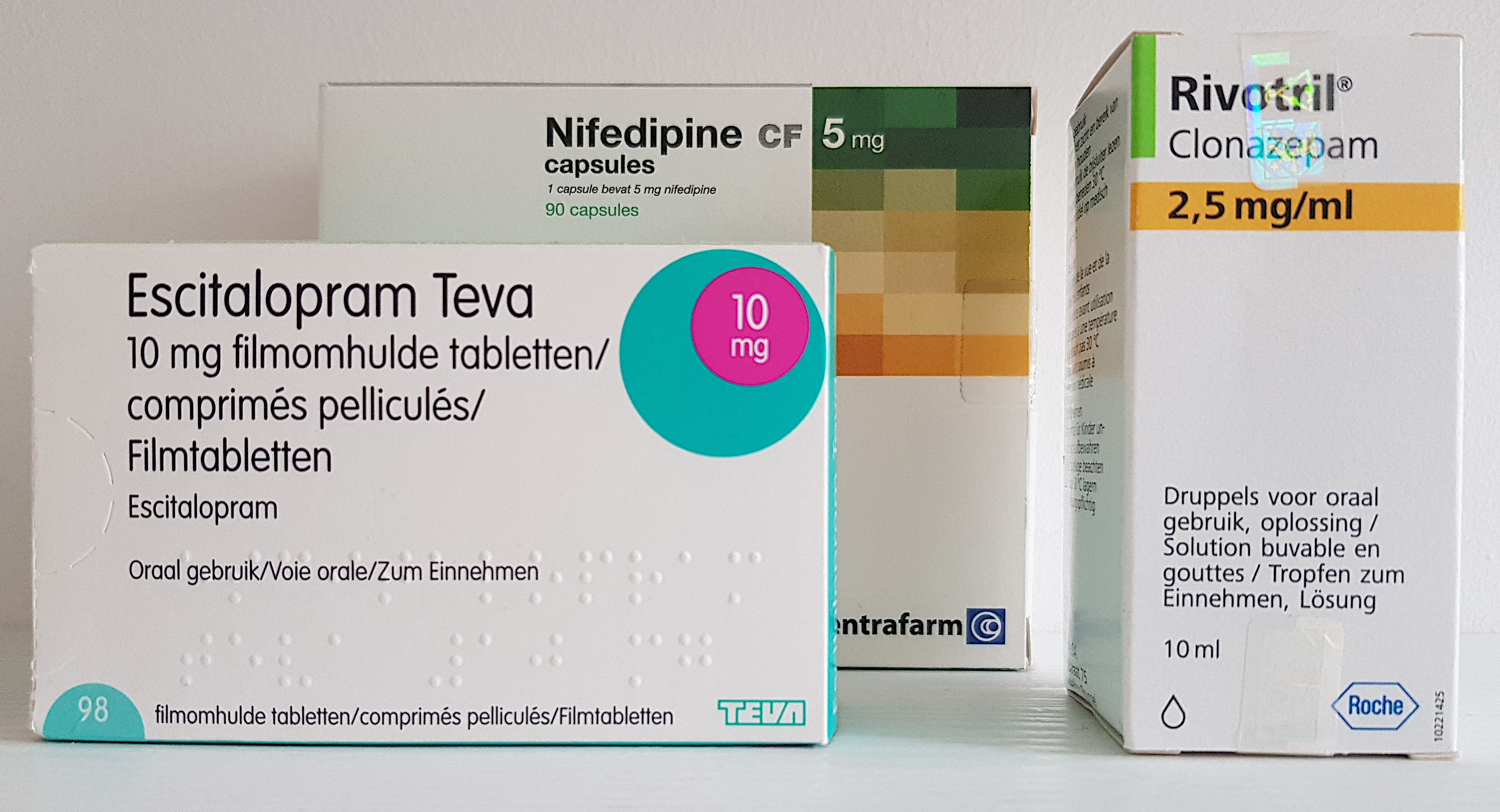
Medicines that can be prescribed against the cricopharyngeal spasms.

Treatments based on medicines

- Antispasmodic medicines (immediate benefit)
  - Nifedipine, in small doses (2x 5 mg per day, 10 mg per day in slow release or as much as the blood pressure allows it), can be prescribed in an attempt to provide a first relief, by blocking the esophageal spasms that may be involved and reduce the reflux going up to the throat.
- Muscle relaxants (benefit obtained on the short-term)
  - Clonazepam (Rivotril), diazepam (Valium) and lorazepam (Ativan) and other benzodiazepines relax the muscles in the throat, slow or halt the contractions. (In some people, benzodiazepines taken on the long term may have addictive properties.)
- Anti-depressants (benefit and solution obtained on the mid-term)
  - Serotonin reuptake inhibitors (escitalopram etc.) address the root cause related to a low level of serotonin. It takes 6 weeks to deliver the first effects.
  - Tricyclic anti-depressants (Pamelor etc.), taken in small doses, have been having positive results recently, according to the Cleveland Clinic.
- Proton-pump inhibitors, or other medicines acting against reflux, if signs of reflux are found, until they disappear.

A typical treatment that can be prescribed starts, for instance, with nidefipine (as long as it brings a relief), a benzodiazepine (one month maximum) that has a myorelaxant effect and that can be chosen to simultaneously address other faces of the problem (anxiety, sleeping issue) and a well-tolerated anti-depressant like escitalopram (long enough so that the problem does not come back).

Treatments based on other factors

- Stress reduction
  - Take notes of what improves and worsens the symptoms.
  - High stress levels make the spasms more noticeable.
  - Psychologists provide custom tips and tricks.
  - Mindfulness, with professionals, or smartphone apps.
  - Breathing exercises such as cardiac coherence.
  - Wellness, spa.
  - Sport.
- Physiotherapy
  - Neck stretching may provide temporary relief. Hands are placed on each clavicle as you hyperextend your neck (looking at the ceiling). Protracting the jaw with the neck extended will stretch your neck. Hold this position for 20–30 seconds.
- Warm fluids
  - Hot fluids may be helpful for some people with cricopharyngeal spasm (or other oesophageal disorders).
  - Herbal tea.

Other therapies

- Transcutaneous stimulation of vagus nerve through the ear proved to reduce symptoms of that family (long lasting, on the way of the vagus nerve) according to a study realized in the context of long covid.
- Botox injections may temporarily disable the muscle and provide relief for 3–4 months per injection.
