= Postinfectious cough =

Cough after a viral respiratory tract infection

A postinfectious cough is a lingering cough that follows a respiratory tract infection, such as a common cold or flu and lasting up to eight weeks. Postinfectious cough is a clinically recognized condition represented within the medical literature. Patients usually experience repeated episodes of postinfectious cough. The heightened sensitivity in the respiratory tract is demonstrated by inhalation cough challenge.

== Cause ==
One possible cause for postinfectious cough is that the receptors that are responsible for stimulating the cough during the respiratory tract infection are up-regulated by respiratory tract infection and continue to stimulate even after the virus has disappeared.

== Treatment ==
Postinfectious cough usually goes away on its own. A 2014 meta analysis of three studies on the effect of honey and coffee, published in the Indian Journal of Traditional Knowledge, suggested that "honey plus coffee" may be an effective treatment. This meta analysis used solely the authors' own studies, only one of which included a negative control or comparison to prednisone (a standard treatment).

== See also ==
- Asthma
- Bronchiolitis
- Cough medicine
- Globus pharyngis
