= Nasal drip =

- Running nose or runny nose
- Post-nasal drip, mucus running down the throat
