= Neck spasm =

Involuntary contraction of neck muscles

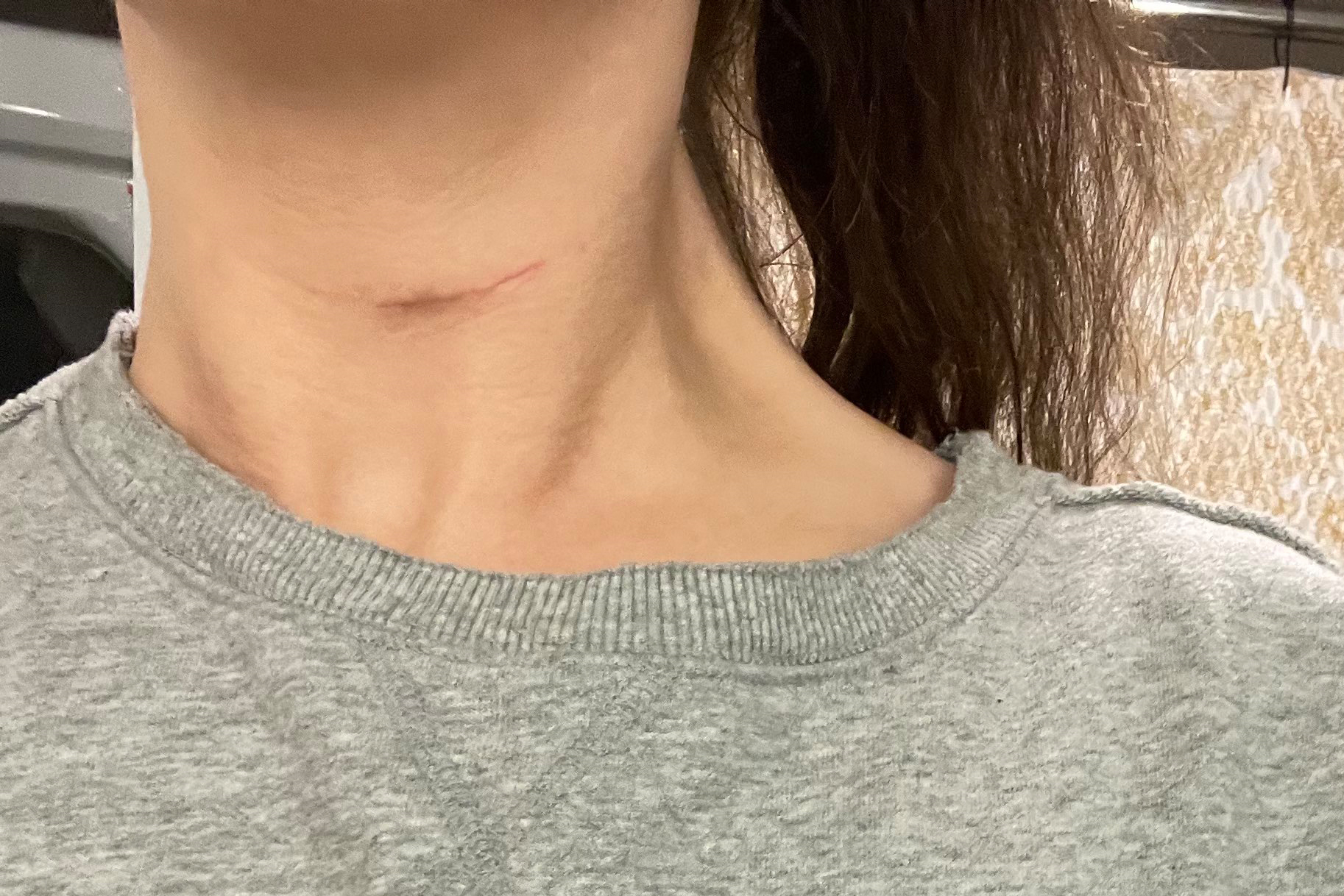
Asymmetrical neck spasms following cervical artificial disc replacement surgery.

A neck spasm is an involuntary contraction of the muscles in the neck region.

== Causes of neck spasm ==
The possible causes of neck spasms include:

- Anxiety
- Muscle strain
- Tension
- Tetanus
- Spasmodic torticollis
- Stress
- Surgery
- Viral infection
- Whiplash injury
- or other causes of spasm
