= Vocal cord dysfunction =

Abnormal closure of the vocal folds

Vocal Cord Dysfunction
- Other names: Paradoxical Vocal Fold Motion (PVFM) or Paradoxical Vocal Cord Movement (PVCM)
- Specialty: Otorhinolaryngology

Vocal cord dysfunction (VCD) is a condition affecting the vocal cords. It is characterized by abnormal closure of the vocal folds, which can result in significant difficulties and distress during breathing, particularly during inhalation.

Due to the similarity in symptoms, VCD attacks are often mistaken for asthma attacks or laryngospasms. Symptoms of VCD are not always present. Rather, they often occur as episodic "attacks," where the patient will be symptomatic for a short period. Although several contributing factors have been identified, the exact cause of VCD is unknown.

Diagnosis of VCD may include a series of evaluations, including pulmonary function tests, medical imaging, and the evaluation or visualization of the vocal folds during an episode through the use of videolaryngoscopy. Such evaluations can also help to rule out other conditions that can affect the upper and lower airways. Treatment of VCD often combines behavioral, medical, and psychological approaches, most often including an otolaryngologist, a psychologist, and a speech-language pathologist. Although information on the incidence and prevalence of VCD is limited, it is known to occur most frequently in young women.

== Signs and symptoms ==
Many of the symptoms are not limited to the disorder, as they may resemble a number of conditions that affect the upper and lower airways. Such conditions include asthma, angioedema, vocal cord tumors, and vocal cord paralysis.

People with vocal cord dysfunction often complain of "difficulty in breathing in" or "fighting for breath", which can lead to subjective respiratory distress, and in severe cases, loss of consciousness. They may report tightness in the throat or chest, choking, stridor on inhalation and wheezing, which can resemble the symptoms of asthma. These episodes of dyspnea can be recurrent and symptoms can range from mild to severe and prolonged in some cases. Agitation and a sense of panic are not uncommon and can result in hospitalization.

Different subtypes of vocal cord dysfunction are characterized by additional symptoms. For instance, momentary aphonia can be caused by laryngospasm, an involuntary spasm of the vocal cords and a strained or hoarse voice may be perceived when the vocal cord dysfunction occurs during speech.

Many of the symptoms are not specific to vocal cord dysfunction and can resemble a number of conditions that affect the upper and lower airways.

=== Presentation ===
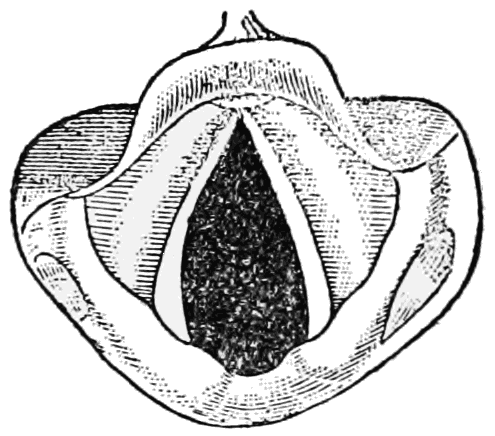
Open vocal cords as seen during normal inhalation

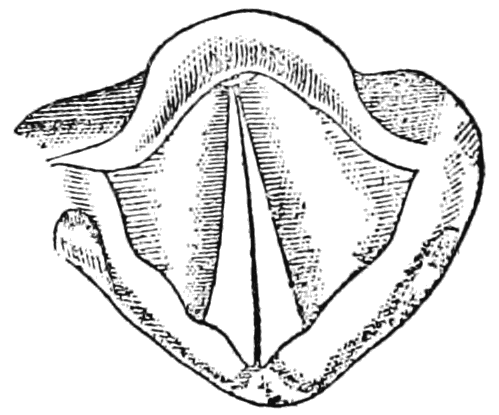
Closed vocal cords as seen during a VCD episode (or when speaking)

VCD can mimic asthma, anaphylaxis, collapsed lungs, pulmonary embolism, or fat embolism, which can lead to an inaccurate diagnosis and inappropriate, potentially harmful, treatment. Some cases of VCD are misdiagnosed as asthma, but are unresponsive to asthma therapy, including bronchodilators and steroids. Among adult patients, women tend to be diagnosed more often. Among children and teenage patients, VCD has been linked with high participation in competitive sports and family orientation towards high achievement.

Vocal cord dysfunction co-occurs with asthma approximately 40% of the time. This frequently results in a misdiagnosis of asthma alone. Even young children can tell the difference between an asthma attack (primarily difficulty exhaling) and a VCD attack (primarily difficulty inhaling). Knowing the difference between the two will help those who have both know when to use the rescue inhaler prescribed or when to use the breathing recovery exercises trained by a speech-language pathologist.

Episodes can be triggered suddenly or develop gradually and triggers are numerous. Primary causes are believed to be gastroesophageal reflux disease (GERD), extra-esophageal reflux (EERD), exposure to inhaled allergens, post-nasal drip, exercise, or neurological conditions that can cause difficulty inhaling only during waking. Published studies emphasize anxiety or stress as a primary cause while more recent literature indicates a likely physical etiology. This disorder has been observed from infancy through old age, with the observation of its occurrence in infants leading some to believe that a physiological cause such as reflux or allergy is likely. Certain medications, such as antihistamines for allergies, cause drying of the mucous membranes, which can cause further irritation or hypersensitivity of the vocal cords.

=== Potential comorbidities ===
VCD has long been strongly associated with a variety of psychological or psychogenic factors, including conversion disorder, major depression, obsessive-compulsive disorder, anxiety (especially in adolescents), stress (particularly stress relating to competitive sports), physical and sexual abuse, post-traumatic stress disorder, panic attacks, factitious disorder and adjustment disorder.

Anxiety and depression may occur in certain patients as a result of having VCD, rather than being the cause of it. Psychological factors are important precipitating factors for many patients with VCD; although exercise is also a major trigger for episodes of VCD, some patients experience VCD co-occurring with anxiety regardless of whether or not they are physically active at the time of the VCD/anxiety episode. Experiencing or witnessing a traumatic event related to breathing (such as a near-drowning or life-threatening asthma attack, for example), has also been identified as a risk factor for VCD.

VCD has also been associated with certain neurologic diseases including Arnold-Chiari malformation, cerebral aqueduct stenosis, cortical or upper motor neuron injury (such as that resulting from stroke), amyotrophic lateral sclerosis (ALS), parkinsonism syndromes and other movement disorders. However, this association occurs only rarely. In addition, it has been associated with Ehlers-Danlos Syndromes, a group of connective tissue disorders.

== Causes ==
The exact cause of VCD is not known, and it is unlikely that a single underlying cause exists. Several contributing factors have been identified, which vary widely among VCD patients with different medical histories. Physical exercise (including, but not limited to, competitive athletics) is one of the major triggers for VCD episodes, leading to its frequent misdiagnosis as exercise-induced asthma. Other triggers include airborne pollutants and irritants such as smoke, dust, gases, soldering fumes, cleaning chemicals such as ammonia, perfumes, and other odors. Gastroesophageal reflux disease (GERD) and rhinosinusitis (inflammation of the paranasal sinuses and nasal cavity) may also play a role in inflaming the airway and leading to symptoms of VCD as discussed below.

Laryngeal hyperresponsiveness is considered the most likely physiologic cause of VCD, brought on by a range of different triggers that cause inflammation and/or irritation of the larynx (voice box). The glottic closure reflex (or laryngeal adductor reflex) serves to protect the airway, and it is possible that this reflex becomes hyperactive in some individuals, resulting in the paradoxical vocal fold closure seen in VCD. Two major causes of laryngeal inflammation and hyperresponsiveness are gastroesophageal reflux disease (GERD) and postnasal drip (associated with rhinosinusitis, allergic or nonallergic rhinitis, or a viral upper respiratory tract infection (URI)). Rhinosinusitis is very common among patients with VCD and for many patients, VCD symptoms are ameliorated when the rhinosinusitis is treated. GERD is also common among VCD patients, but only some experience an improvement in VCD symptoms when GERD is treated. Other causes of laryngeal hyperresponsiveness include inhalation of toxins and irritants, cold and dry air, episodic croup and laryngopharyngeal reflux (LPR).

== Risk factors ==
The following increases an individual's chances for acquiring VCD:

- Upper airway inflammation (allergic or non-allergic rhinitis, chronic sinusitis, recurrent upper respiratory infections)
- Gastroesophageal reflux disease
- Past traumatic event that involved breathing (e.g. near-drowning, suffocation)
- Severe emotional trauma or distress
- Female gender
- Playing a wind instrument
- Playing a competitive or elite sport

== Diagnosis ==
The most effective diagnostic strategy is to perform laryngoscopy during an episode, at which time abnormal movement of the cords, if present, can be observed. If the endoscopy is not performed during an episode, it is likely that the vocal folds will be moving normally, a 'false negative' finding.

Spirometry may also be useful to establish the diagnosis of VCD when performed during a crisis or after a nasal provocation test. With spirometry, just as the expiratory loop may show flattening or concavity when expiration is affected in asthma, so may the inspiratory loop show truncation or flattening in VCD. Of course, testing may well be negative when symptoms are absent.

=== Differential diagnosis ===
The symptoms of VCD are often inaccurately attributed to asthma, which in turn results in the unnecessary and futile intake of corticosteroids, bronchodilators and leukotriene modifiers, although there are instances of comorbidity of asthma and VCD.

The differential diagnosis for vocal cord dysfunction includes vocal fold swelling from allergy, asthma, or some obstruction of the vocal folds or throat. Anyone suspected of this condition should be evaluated and the vocal folds (voice box) visualized.
In individuals who experience a persistent difficulty with inhaling, consideration should be given to a neurological cause such as brain stem compression, cerebral palsy, etc.

The main difference between VCD and asthma is the audible stridor or wheezing that occurs at different stages of the breath cycle: VCD usually causes stridor on the inhalation, while asthma results in wheezing during exhalation. Patients with asthma usually respond to the usual medication and see their symptoms resolve. Clinical measures that can be done to differentiate VCD from asthma include:

- rhinolaryngoscopy: A patient with asthma will have normal vocal cord movement, while one with VCD will display vocal cord abduction during inhalation
- spirometry: A change in the measure following the administration of a bronchodilator is suggestive of asthma rather than VCD
- chest radiography: The presence of hyperinflation and peribronchial thickening are indicative of asthma, as patients with VCD will show normal results

== Treatments ==
Once a diagnosis of VCD has been confirmed by a medical professional, a specific treatment plan can be implemented. If vocal cord dysfunction is secondary to an underlying condition, such as asthma, gastroesophageal reflux disease (GERD), or postnasal drip, it is important to treat the primary condition as this will help control VCD symptoms. Conventional treatments for VCD are often multidisciplinary and include speech-language pathology, psychotherapy, behavioral therapy, use of anti-anxiety and anti-depressant medications, medical interventions, and hypnotherapy. There is no uniform approach. The information from randomized, blinded studies is limited.

=== Behavioral approaches ===
Speech-language pathologists provide behavioral treatment for VCD. Speech therapy usually involves educating the client on the nature of the problem, what happens when symptoms are present, and then comparing this to what happens during normal breathing and phonation. Intervention goals target teaching a client breathing and relaxation exercises so that they can control their throat muscles and keep the airway open, allowing air to flow in and out.

Breathing techniques can be taught to reduce tension in the throat, neck, and upper body and bring attention to the flow of air during respiration. Diaphragm support during breathing decreases muscle tension in the larynx. These techniques are meant to move awareness away from the act of breathing in and focus on the auditory feedback provided by the air moving in and out.

Other techniques can involve breathing through a straw and panting, which widens the opening of the throat by activating the Posterior cricoarytenoid (PCA) muscle. Endoscopic feedback can also be used to show a patient what is happening when they are doing simple tasks such as taking a deep breath or speaking on an inspiration. This provides the client with visual information so that they can actually see what behaviors help to open the throat and what behaviors constrict the throat. Respiratory muscle strength training, a form of increased resistance training using a hand-held breathing device has also been reported to alleviate symptoms.

Speech therapy has been found to eliminate up to 90% of ER visits in patients with VCD.

=== Medical approaches ===
Medical often works in conjunction with behavioral approaches. A pulmonary or ENT (otolaryngologist) specialist will screen for and address any potential underlying pathology that may be associated with VCD. Managing GERD has also been found to relieve laryngospasm, a spasm of the vocal cords that makes breathing and speaking difficult.

Non-invasive positive pressure ventilation can be used if a patient's vocal cords adduct (close) during exhalation. Mild sedatives have also been employed to reduce anxiety as well as reduce acute symptoms of VCD. Benzodiazepines are an example of one such treatment, though they have been linked to a risk of suppression of the respiratory drive. While Ketamine, a dissociative anesthetic, does not suppress respiratory drive, it has been thought to be associated with laryngospasms.

For more severe VCD cases, physicians may inject botulinum toxin into the vocal (thyroarytenoid) muscles to weaken or decrease muscle tension. Nebulized Lignocaine can also been used in acute cases and helium-oxygen inhalation given by a face mask has been used in cases of respiratory distress.

=== Psychological approaches ===
Psychological interventions including psychotherapy, cognitive behavioral therapy (CBT), Biofeedback, and teaching self-hypnosis are also suggested to treat VCD. Intervention is generally targeted at making the client aware of stressors that may trigger VCD symptoms, to implement strategies to reduce stress and anxiety, and to teach techniques for coping with their symptoms.

CBT can focus on bringing awareness to negative thought patterns and help reframe them by focusing on problem solving strategies. Psychologists may also use relaxation to reduce distress when a patient is experiencing symptoms. Biofeedback can be a helpful addition to psychotherapy. The aim of Biofeedback is to educate the client on what happens to the vocal cords during breathing and to help them learn to control their symptoms.

Choosing an intervention strategy needs to be assessed by a multidisciplinary team and individualized therapy planned carefully, keeping the characteristics of each patient in mind.

== Prognosis ==
The natural prognosis of VCD in both children and adults are not well described in the literature. Additionally, there is currently no research that has studied whether the underlying cause of VCD makes a difference in the resolution of symptoms or in the long-term prognosis of the impairment.

Information on the prognosis of VCD after acute therapies is also limited. Minimal response has been documented with the continued treatment of asthma in people with VCD using inhaled bronchodilators, corticosteroids and other asthma medications. While using Botox in VCD has limited reports, those that are available report successful resolution of exercise-induced VCD symptoms for up to 2 months.

Outcomes of chronic VCD treatment are similarly limited. When pediatric patients undergoing hypnosis therapy were studied, more than half saw either a reduction or resolution of VCD. Even though it is widely used, no long-term studies have been done to study the prognosis of VCD after psychotherapy.

Speech therapy is the main course of treatment for long-term management of VCD and includes a variety of techniques such as relaxed-throat breathing, respiratory retraining therapy, and vocal hygiene counseling. Most studies agree that symptoms of VCD improve in patients and few continue to require asthma medications six months post speech therapy intervention. Significant improvements were reported for respiratory retraining therapy, including fewer episodes of dyspnea per month and decreased respiratory stress severity.

For those adolescent patients who recovered from VCD, the average time before the symptoms were resolved was 4–5 months. However, some adolescents had VCD symptoms even 5 years post VCD onset, regardless of intervention. It has been noted that some patients do not respond to standard VCD therapies and continue to express recurrent symptoms.

== Epidemiology ==
There is currently a limited amount of information available on the incidence and prevalence of VCD, and the various rates reported in the literature are most likely an underestimate. Although VCD is thought to be rare overall, its prevalence among the population at large is not known.

However, numerous studies have been conducted on its incidence and prevalence among patients presenting with asthma and exertional dyspnea. A VCD incidence rate of 2% has been reported among patients whose primary complaint was either asthma or dyspnea; the same incidence rate has also been reported among patients with acute asthma exacerbation. Meanwhile, much higher VCD incidence rates have also been reported in asthmatic populations, ranging from 14% in children with refractory asthma to 40% in adults with the same complaint. It has also been reported that the VCD incidence rate is as high as 27% in non-asthmatic teenagers and young adults.

Data on the prevalence of VCD is also limited. An overall prevalence of 2.5% has been reported in patients presenting with asthma. Among adults with asthma considered "difficult to control", 10% were found to have VCD while 30% were found to have both VCD and asthma. Among children with severe asthma, a VCD prevalence rate of 14% has been reported. However, higher rates have also been reported; among one group of schoolchildren thought to have exercise-induced asthma, it was found that 26.9% actually had VCD and not asthma. Among intercollegiate athletes with exercise-induced asthma, the VCD rate has been estimated at 3%.

In patients presenting with symptoms of dyspnea, prevalence rates ranging from 2.8% to 22% have been reported in various studies. It has been reported that two to three times more females than males have VCD. VCD is especially common in females who have psychological conditions. There is an increased risk associated with being young and female. Among patients with VCD, 71% are over the age of 18. In addition, 73% of those with VCD have a previous psychiatric diagnosis. VCD has also been reported in newborns with gastroesophageal reflux disorder (GERD).

== See also ==
- Puberphonia
