= Rhinosinusitis =

Respiratory disease

Rhinosinusitis is a simultaneous infection of the nasal mucosa (rhinitis) and an infection of the mucosa of the paranasal sinuses (sinusitis). A distinction is made between acute rhinosinusitis and chronic rhinosinusitis.

== Background ==
Because sinusitis typically is preceded by an infection of the nasal mucosa, some authors suggest generally replacing the term “sinusitis” with “rhinosinusitis”. The functional unity of the two mucosa speaks in favor of this replacement. A distinction is made between acute and chronic rhinosinusitis. Acute sinusitis lasts a maximum of 12 weeks. The clinical symptoms of acute rhinosinusitis are purulent nasal secretion, nasal obstruction and/or tension headache or feeling of fullness in the facial area. Acute rhinosinusitis can be caused by a viral or bacterial infection – a distinction is not possible during the first days. If the clinical picture follows a two-stage development, it indicates a bacterial rhinosinusitis. Chronic rhinosinusitis lasts more than 12 weeks with no complete recovery. The symptoms of chronic rhinosinusitis are less prominent/pronounced than of acute rhinosinusitis. Chronic rhinosinusitis is characterized/shaped by an impaired nasal inspiration, feelings of pressure and swelling in the facial area, as well as a higher susceptibility to infection.

Severe complications are rare, although orbital and intracranial inflammations can occur.

== Therapy ==
Inhalation therapy mechanically removes deposits and relieves the symptoms of allergic or inflammatory diseases like acute or chronic rhinosinusitis (CRS). In essence, inhalation therapy resolves the obstruction found to be bothersome, alleviates the irritation of the nasal mucosa and supports the self-cleaning mechanisms. Inhalation therapy is commonly mentioned in North American and international guidelines for treatment of CRS (Bachmann et al., 2000). There are different therapeutic approaches for acute rhinosinusitis. Among other things, pain killers, decongestant nose drops or sprays to reduce the local swelling of the mucosa, topical steroids and phytotherapeutics can be used. In case of a bacterial rhinosinusitis, antibiotics are a typical therapeutic treatment.

== See also ==
- Sinusitis
- Post-nasal drip
- Entry for rhinosinusitis in Flexikon, a German Wiki by DocCheck
