= Spasm =

Involuntary contraction of a muscle, organ or orifice

Muscle spasm
- Specialty: Neurology

A spasm is a sudden involuntary contraction of a muscle, a group of muscles, or a hollow organ, such as the bladder.

A spasmodic muscle contraction may be caused by many medical conditions, including dystonia. Most commonly, it is a muscle cramp which is accompanied by a sudden burst of pain. A muscle cramp is usually harmless and ceases after a few minutes. It is typically caused by ion imbalance or muscle fatigue.

There are other causes of involuntary muscle contractions, and some of these may cause a health problem.

== Description and causes ==
Spasms occur when the part of the brain that controls movement malfunctions, causing involuntary muscle activity.

A spasm may be a muscle contraction caused by abnormal nerve stimulation or by abnormal activity of the muscle itself.

=== Causes ===
The cause of spasms is often unknown, but it can be due to an inherited genetic problem, a side effect of medications, Parkinson's disease, a stroke, cerebral palsy or multiple sclerosis.

Old age can also cause spasms and cramp.

Spasms can occur in dystonia, and in spasticity.

=== Effects ===
A spasm may lead to muscle strains or tears in tendons and ligaments if the force of the spasm exceeds the ultimate tensile strength of the underlying connective tissue. This can occur with a particularly strong spasm or with weakened connective tissue.

=== Types of spasm ===
A hypertonic muscle spasm is a condition of chronic, excessive muscle tone (i.e., tension in a resting muscle). This is the amount of contraction that remains when a muscle is not working. A true hypertonic spasm is caused by malfunctioning feedback nerves. This is much more serious and is permanent unless treated. In this case, the hypertonic muscle tone is excessive, and the muscles are unable to relax.

A subtype of spasm is colic. This is an episodic pain caused by spasm of smooth muscle in a particular organ (e.g., the bile duct). A characteristic of colic is the sensation of having to move about, and the pain may induce nausea or vomiting.

== See also ==
- Antispasmodic
- Blepharospasm
- Cadaveric spasm
- Convulsion
- Cramp
- Cricopharyngeal spasm
- Ejaculation
- Epileptic seizure
- Jactitation (medicine)
- Myoclonus
- Neck spasm
- Orgasm
- Spasmodic dysphonia
- Spasticity
- Tremor
