= Respiratory hygiene and cough etiquette =

Social behavior to prevent infection

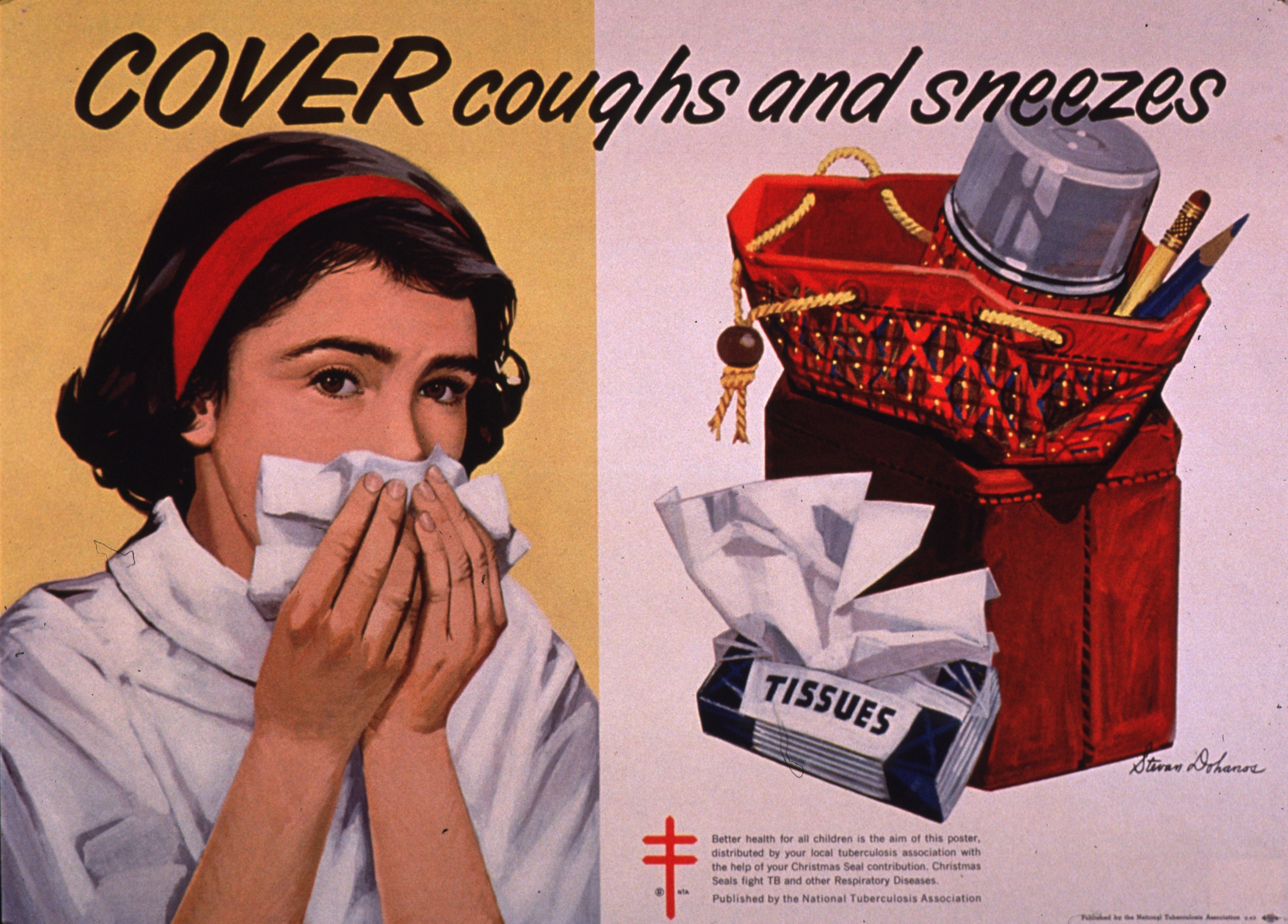
'Cover coughs and sneezes' poster (circa 1964)

Respiratory hygiene and cough etiquette are the behavioural expectations for coughing and sneezing, intended to prevent the spread of infectious diseases through respiratory secretions.

Modern cough etiquette is a disease prevention measure. Covering the mouth and nose when coughing or sneezing reduces the potential for transmission of respiratory infectious agents.

The term "cough etiquette" first appeared in 2000 in a manual on tuberculosis control as "turning head and covering mouth when coughing and using cloths or spittoons to spit into", but it has evolved since then. The recommendation to cough and sneeze into the arm, sleeve or elbow as a part of respiratory hygiene and cough etiquette was introduced into the literature after the SARS and avian influenza outbreaks.
