= Eosinophilic bronchitis =

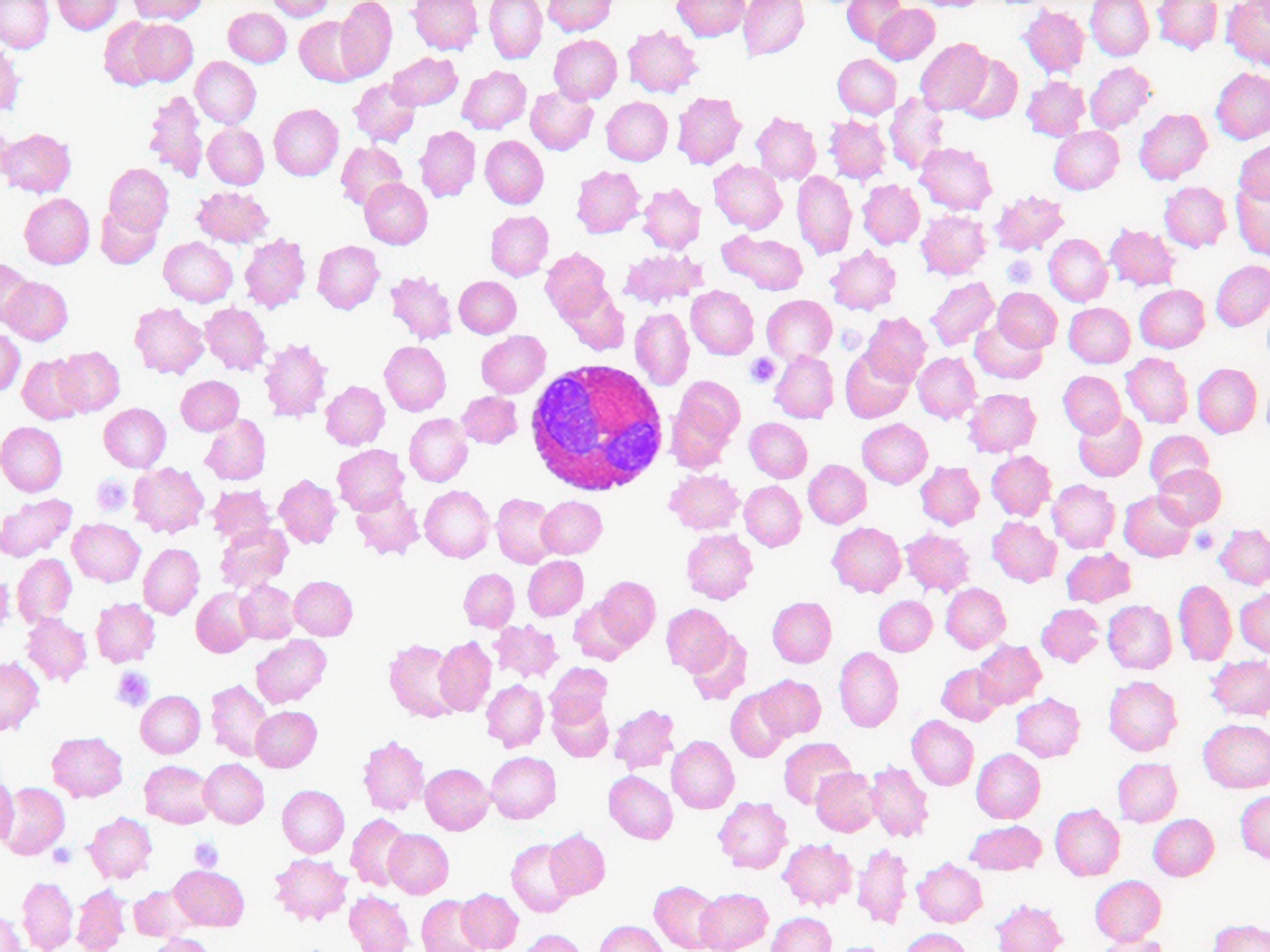
- Eosinophils
- Specialty: Pulmonology
- Symptoms: Chronic dry Cough
- Causes: airway inflammation due to excessive mast cell recruitment
- Treatment: corticosteroids

Eosinophilic bronchitis (EB) is a type of airway inflammation due to excessive mast cell recruitment and activation in the superficial airways as opposed to the smooth muscles of the airways as seen in asthma. It often results in a chronic cough. Lung function tests are usually normal. Inhaled corticosteroids are often an effective treatment.

== Signs and symptoms ==
The most common symptom of eosinophilic bronchitis is a chronic dry cough lasting more than 6–8 weeks. Eosinophilic bronchitis is also defined by the increased number of eosinophils, a type of white blood cell, in the sputum compared to that of healthy people. As patients with asthma usually present with eosinophils in the sputum as well, some literature distinguish the two by classifying the condition as non-asthmatic eosinophilic bronchitis (NAEB) versus eosinophilic bronchitis in asthma. Non-asthmatic eosinophilic bronchitis is different from asthma in that it does not have airflow obstruction or airway hyperresponsiveness. Along with eosinophils, the number of mast cells, another type of white blood cell, is also significantly increased in the bronchial wash fluid of eosinophilic bronchitis patients compared to asthmatic patients and other healthy people. Asthmatic patients, however, have greater number of mast cells that go into the smooth muscle of the airway, distinguishing it from non-asthmatic eosinophilic bronchitis. The increased number of mast cells in the smooth muscle correlate with the increased hyperresponsiveness of the airway seen in asthma patients, and the difference in the mast cell infiltration of the smooth muscle may explain why eosinophilic bronchitis patients do not have airway hyperresponsiveness. Eosinophilic bronchitis has also been linked to other conditions such as COPD, atopic cough, and allergic rhinitis.

== Pathophysiology ==
The number of eosinophils in the sputum samples of non-asthmatic eosinophilic bronchitis patients are similar to those of patients with asthma. In the sputum samples of those with NAEB, histamine and prostaglandin D2 is increased. This suggests that the superficial airways have significant mast cell activation and this may lead to the differing symptom presentation compared to asthma. Inflammation caused by eosinophils is associated with an increased cough reflex. In another study, however, some follow-up patients who were asymptomatic also had increased eosinophils in their sputum, indicating that the inflammation is not always associated with an increased cough reflex.

The cause of the inflammation can be associated with environmental triggers or common allergens such as dust, chloramine, latex, or welding fumes.

== Diagnosis ==
Diagnosis of eosinophilic bronchitis is not common as it requires the examination of the patient's sputum for a definitive diagnosis, which can be difficult in those who present with a dry cough. In order to induce the sputum, the patient has to inhale increasing concentrations of hypertonic saline solution. If this is unavailable, a bronchoalveolar lavage can be done, and the bronchial wash fluid can be examined for eosinophils. The diagnosis is usually considered later by ruling out other life-threatening conditions or more common diagnoses such as asthma and GERD, and by seeing an improvement in symptoms with inhaled corticosteroid treatment. Chest X-rays and lung function tests are usually normal. CT scans may show some diffuse airway wall thickening.

== Management ==
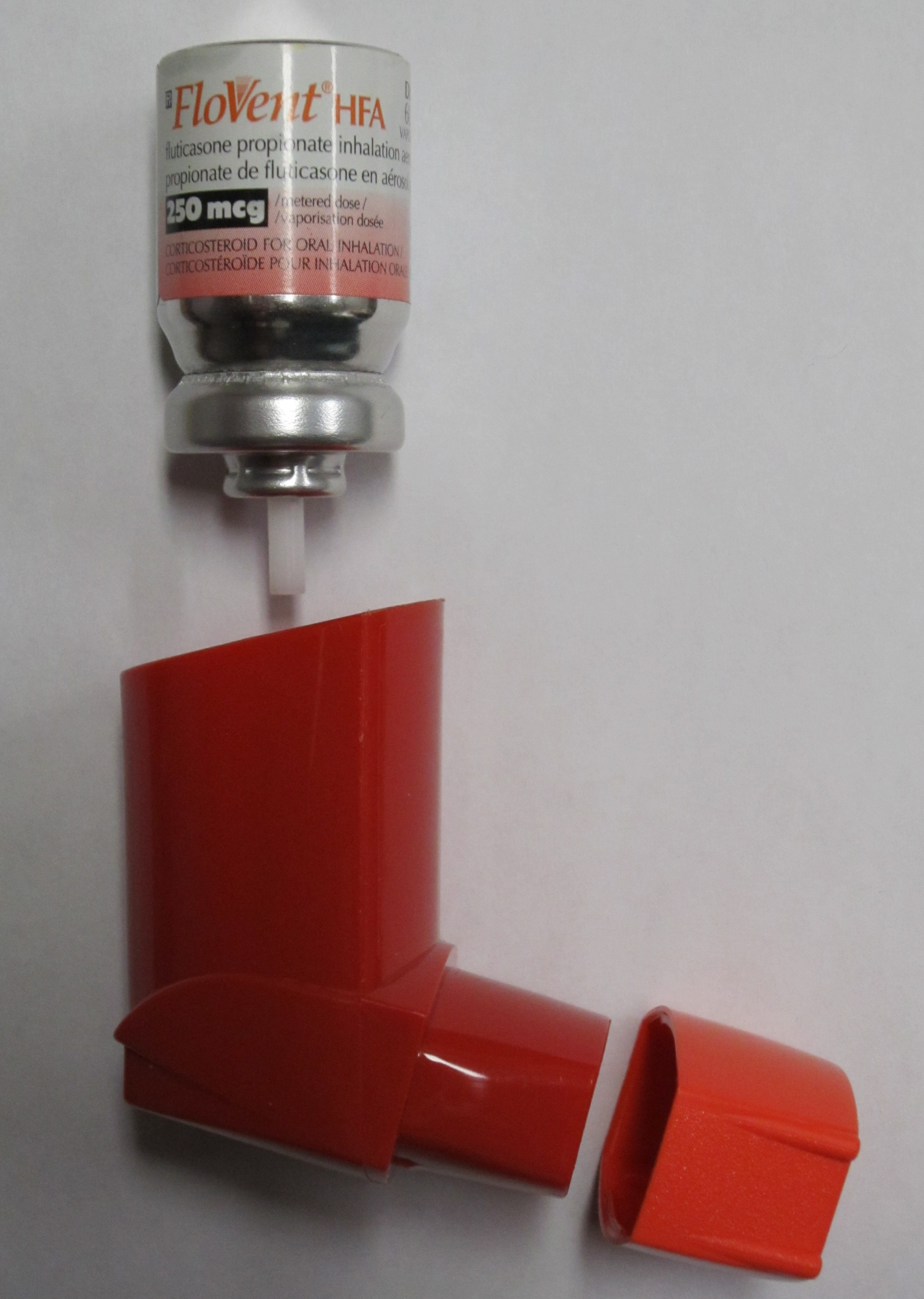
Fluticasone, an inhaled corticosteroid

If the patient has a known allergen or trigger for the eosinophilic bronchitis, the recommended treatment is to avoid the triggers. If the cause of the eosinophilic bronchitis is unknown, the first line treatment is inhaled corticosteroids. Patients respond well to inhaled corticosteroids and their eosinophil counts in their sputum usually decrease after treatment.

There has not been a study to determine the ideal dosage of inhaled corticosteroids for patients with eosinophilic bronchitis, and there is no consensus on whether the treatment should be discontinued once the patient's symptoms resolve or to continue long-term. The use of oral corticosteroids for eosinophilic bronchitis is rare, but it may be considered when inhaled corticosteroids are ineffective in managing the symptoms.

== Epidemiology ==
Approximately 10–30% of people who present with a chronic cough are suspected to be symptomatic due to eosinophilic bronchitis.
