= Vegetative symptoms =

Disturbance of a person's functions necessary to maintain life

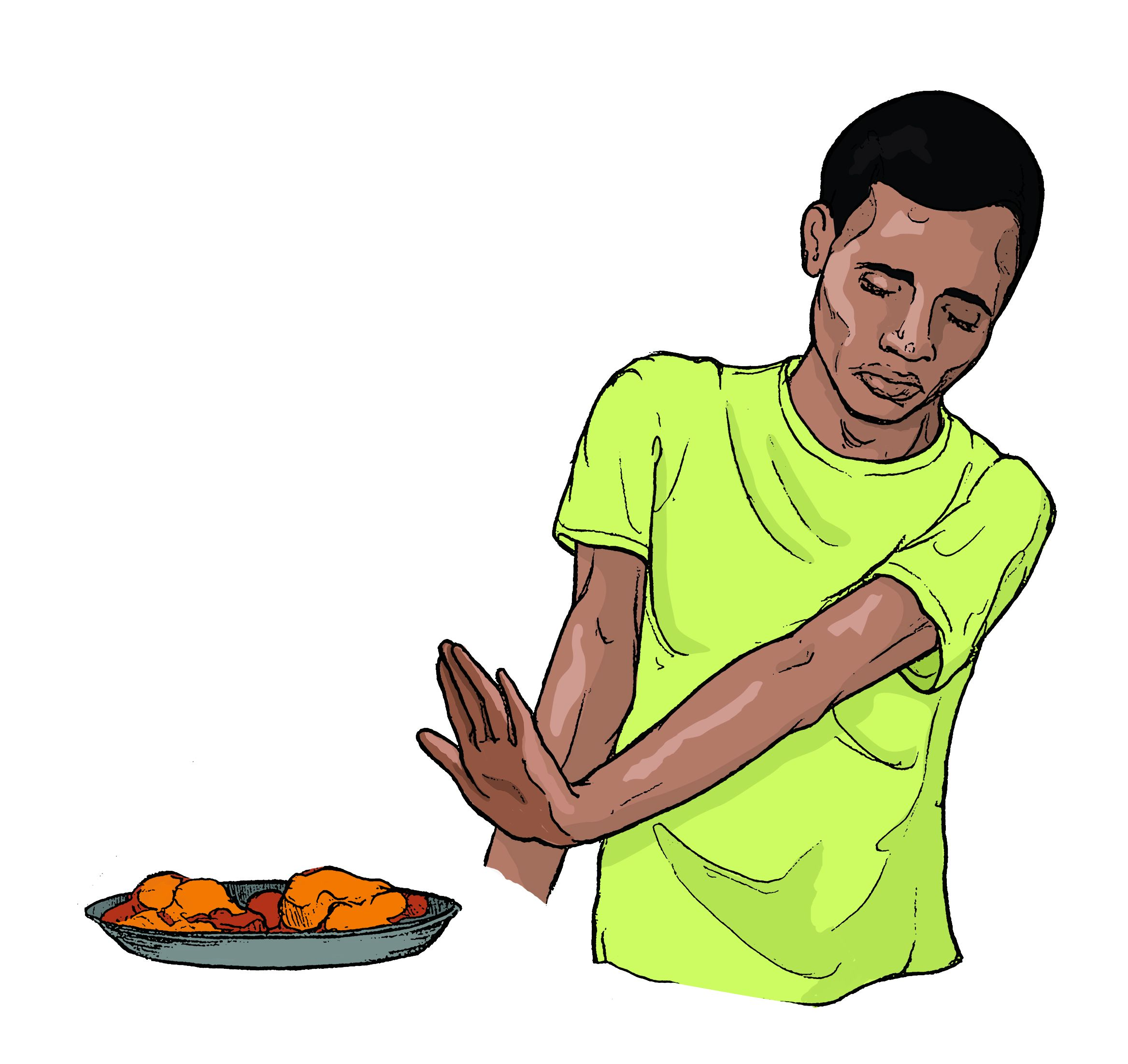
Loss of appetite: a vegetative symptom of melancholic depression

Vegetative symptoms are disturbances of a person's functions necessary to maintain life (vegetative functions). These disturbances are most commonly seen in mood disorders, and are part of the diagnostic criteria for depression, but also appear in other conditions.

Vegetative symptoms in a patient with typical depression include:

- Weight loss and loss of appetite
- Insomnia
- Fatigue and low energy
- Inattention

== Reversed vegetative symptoms ==
Reversed vegetative symptoms include only oversleeping (hypersomnia) and overeating (hyperphagia), as compared to insomnia and loss of appetite. These features are characteristic of atypical depression.

However, there have been studies claiming that these symptoms alone are sufficient to diagnose the condition of atypical depression.

== See also ==
- Sleep disorder
- Dysautonomia
