= Globus pharyngeus =

"Lump in the throat" sensation

- Other names: Globus pharyngeus, globus sensation, globus, globus hystericus, lump in one's throat
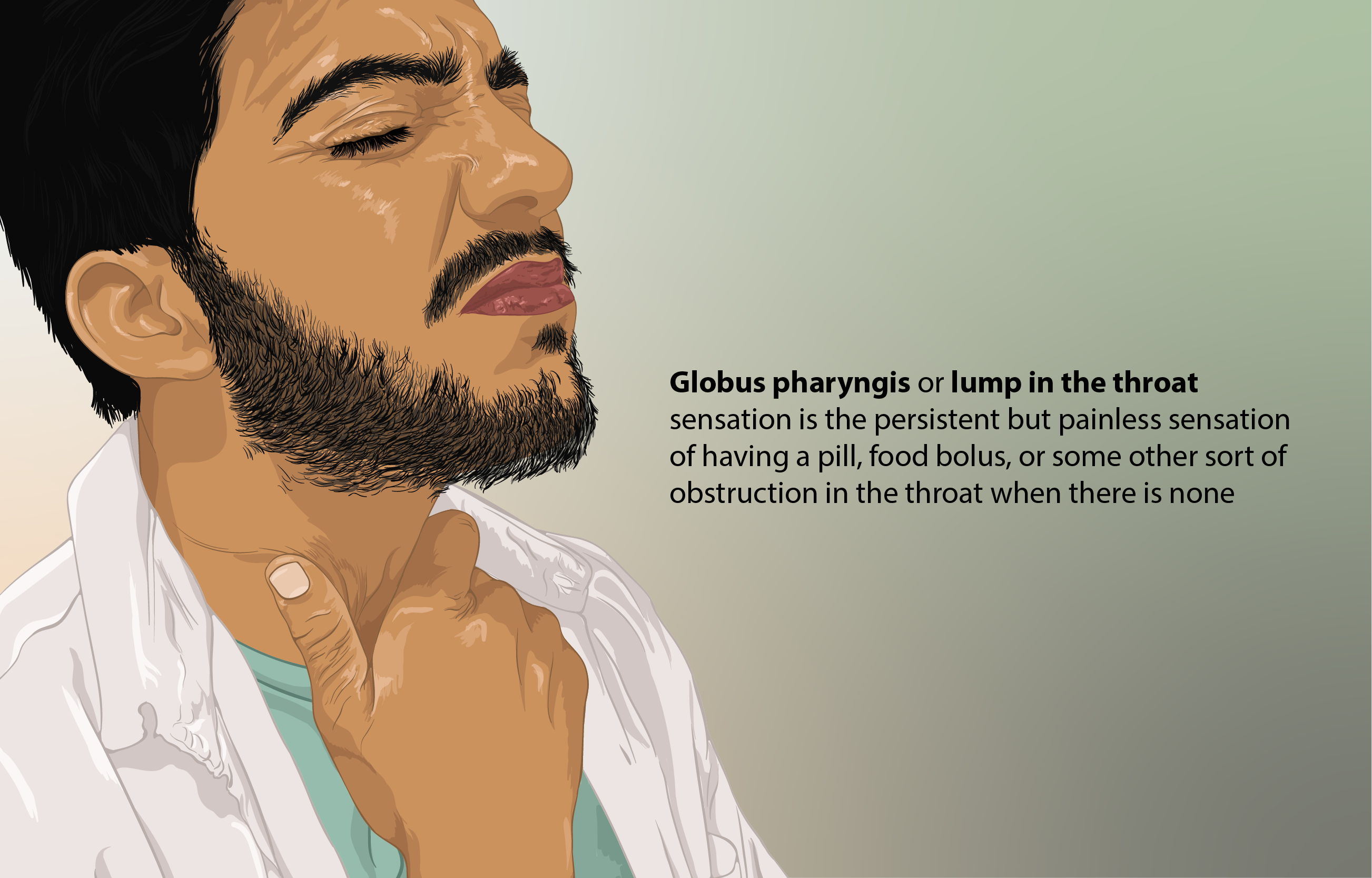
- Specialty: ENT surgery, Gastroenterology, Speech–language pathology, Psychiatry

Globus pharyngeus (also termed globus pharyngis, globus hystericus, or globus sensation) is the persistent but painless sensation of having a pill, food bolus, or some other sort of obstruction in the throat when there is none. Swallowing is typically performed normally, so it is not a true case of dysphagia, but it can become quite irritating. It is common, with 22–45% of people experiencing it at least once in their lifetime.

== Causes ==
The "lump in the throat" sensation that characterizes globus pharyngis is often caused by inflammation of one or more parts of the throat, such as the larynx or hypopharynx, due to cricopharyngeal spasm, gastroesophageal reflux (GERD), or laryngopharyngeal reflux. In some cases the cause is unknown and symptoms may be attributed to a psychogenic cause i.e. a somatoform or anxiety disorder. It has been recognised as a symptom of depression, which responds to anti-depressive treatment.

The results of recent studies have strongly suggested that GERD is a major cause of globus, though this remains under considerable debate.

A less common cause, distinguished by a "lump in the throat" accompanied with clicking sensation and no pain when swallowing, may be due to thyroid-cartilage rubbing against anomalous asymmetrical laryngeal anatomy, e.g., the superior cornu abrading against the thyroid lamina. Surgically trimming the offending thyroid-cartilage provides immediate relief in all cases. However, this cause is frequently misdiagnosed, despite requiring a simple clinical examination involving careful palpation of the neck side to side which elicits the same click sensation (laryngeal crepitus) and pain as when swallowing. Most cases are due to prior trauma to the neck. High-resolution computed tomographic (CT) or MRI scan of the larynx is usually required to fully understand the anomalous laryngeal anatomy. Anterior displacement of the thyroid ala on the affected side while swallowing can help resolve symptoms. Other anomalous laryngeal anatomy with the potential to cause the globus sensation includes thyroid nodules or parathyroid adenomas.

== Diagnosis ==
As globus sensation is a symptom, a diagnosis of globus pharyngis is typically a diagnosis of exclusion. If globus sensation is presenting with other symptoms such as pain, swallowing disorders such as aspiration or regurgitation (dysphagia), weight loss, or voice change, an organic cause needs to be investigated, typically with endoscopy. Barium swallows are not recommended as a diagnostic tool, as although they are less invasive than endoscopy and may be reassuring to the patient, they commonly miss sinister causes. It is very rare that globus sensation presenting with no other symptoms has a sinister cause and therefore endoscopy is not recommended in this case.

=== Differential diagnosis ===
Differential diagnosis must be made from Eagle syndrome, which uses the patient's description of "something caught in my throat" as a diagnostic tool. Eagle syndrome is an elongation of the styloid process causing irritation to nerves and muscles in the region resulting in a number of unusual symptoms.

== Management ==
Reassurance of the patient is to be recommended when no cause can be found. If a cause is identified, the treatment is chosen according to what will resolve the underlying problem.

== See also ==
- Throat clearing – Sound made by a throat
- Chronic cough – Long-term coughing
