= Cough =

Sudden expulsion of air from the lungs as a reflex to clear irritants

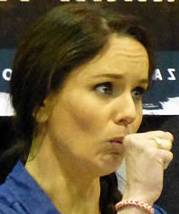
- Pronunciation: Latin: tussis
- Specialty: Pulmonology, otorhinolaryngology

Coughing
The sound of a person coughing.

A cough is a sudden expulsion of air through the large breathing passages which can help clear them of fluids, irritants, foreign particles and microbes. As a protective reflex, coughing can be repetitive with the cough reflex following three phases: an inhalation, a forced exhalation against a closed glottis, and a violent release of air from the lungs following opening of the glottis, usually accompanied by a distinctive sound. Coughing into one's elbow or toward the ground—rather than forward at breathing height—can reduce the spread of infectious droplets in the air.

Frequent coughing usually indicates the presence of a disease. Many viruses and bacteria benefit, from an evolutionary perspective, by causing the host to cough, which helps to spread the disease to new hosts. Irregular coughing is usually caused by a respiratory tract infection but can also be triggered by choking, smoking, air pollution, asthma, gastroesophageal reflux disease, post-nasal drip, chronic bronchitis, lung tumors, heart failure and medications such as angiotensin-converting-enzyme inhibitors (ACE inhibitors) and beta blockers.

Treatment should target the cause; for example, smoking cessation or discontinuing ACE inhibitors. Cough suppressants such as codeine or dextromethorphan are frequently prescribed, but are not recommended for children. Other treatment options may target airway inflammation or may promote mucus expectoration. As it is a natural protective reflex, suppressing the cough reflex might have damaging effects, especially if the cough is productive (producing phlegm).

== Presentation ==
Shadowgraph videos of the outer airflow during a cough, comparing unmasked coughing with several methods of covering one's mouth and nose: coughing into a fist, a cupped hand, a tissue, a "coughcatcher" device, a surgical mask, and an N95 mask

=== Complications ===
The complications of coughing can be classified as either acute or chronic. Acute complications include cough syncope (fainting spells due to decreased blood flow to the brain when coughs are prolonged and forceful), insomnia, cough-induced vomiting, subconjunctival hemorrhage or "red eye", coughing defecation and in women with a prolapsed uterus, cough urination. Chronic complications are common and include abdominal or pelvic hernias, fatigue fractures of lower ribs and costochondritis. Chronic or violent coughing can contribute to damage to the pelvic floor and a possible cystocele.

== Differential diagnosis ==
A cough in children may be either a normal physiological reflex or due to an underlying cause. In healthy children it may be normal in the absence of any disease to cough ten times a day. The most common cause of an acute or subacute cough is a viral respiratory tract infection. A healthy adult also coughs 18.6 times a day on average, but in the population with respiratory disease the geometric mean frequency is 275 times a day. In adults with a chronic cough, i.e. a cough longer than 8 weeks, more than 90% of cases are due to post-nasal drip, asthma, eosinophilic bronchitis, and gastroesophageal reflux disease. The causes of chronic cough are similar in children with the addition of bacterial bronchitis.

=== Infections ===
A cough can be the result of a respiratory tract infection such as the common cold, COVID-19, acute bronchitis, pneumonia, pertussis, or tuberculosis. In the vast majority of cases, acute coughs, i.e. coughs shorter than 3 weeks, are due to the common cold. In people with a normal chest X-ray, tuberculosis is a rare finding. Pertussis is increasingly being recognised as a cause of troublesome coughing in adults.

After a respiratory tract infection has cleared, the person may be left with a postinfectious cough. This typically is a dry, non-productive cough that produces no phlegm. Symptoms may include a tightness in the chest, and a tickle in the throat. This cough may often persist for weeks after an illness. The cause of the cough may be inflammation similar to that observed in repetitive stress disorders such as carpal tunnel syndrome. The repetition of coughing produces inflammation which produces discomfort, which in turn produces more coughing. Postinfectious cough typically does not respond to conventional cough treatments. Medication used for postinfectious coughs may include ipratropium to treat the inflammation, as well as cough suppressants to reduce frequency of the cough until inflammation clears. Inflammation may increase sensitivity to other existing issues such as allergies, and treatment of other causes of coughs (such as use of an air purifier or allergy medicines) may help speed recovery.

=== Reactive airway disease ===
When coughing is the only complaint of a person who meets the criteria for asthma (bronchial hyperresponsiveness and reversibility), this is termed cough-variant asthma. Atopic cough and eosinophilic bronchitis are related conditions. Atopic cough occurs in individuals with a family history of atopy (an allergic condition), abundant eosinophils in the sputum, but with normal airway function and responsiveness. Eosinophilic bronchitis is characterized by eosinophils in sputum and in bronchoalveolar lavage fluid without airway hyperresponsiveness or an atopic background. This condition responds to treatment with corticosteroids. Cough can also worsen in an acute exacerbation of chronic obstructive pulmonary disease.

Asthma is a common cause of chronic cough in adults and children. Coughing may be the only symptom the person has from their asthma, or asthma symptoms may also include wheezing, shortness of breath, and a tight feeling in their chest. Depending on how severe the asthma is, it can be treated with bronchodilators (medicine which causes the airways to open up) or inhaled steroids. Treatment of the asthma should make the cough go away.

Chronic bronchitis is defined clinically as a persistent cough that produces sputum (phlegm) and mucus, for at least three months in two consecutive years. Chronic bronchitis is often the cause of "smoker's cough". The tobacco smoke causes inflammation, secretion of mucus into the airway, and difficulty clearing that mucus out of the airways. Coughing helps clear those secretions out. May be treated by quitting smoking. May also be caused by pneumoconiosis and long-term fume inhalation.

=== Gastroesophageal reflux ===
In people with unexplained cough, gastroesophageal reflux disease should be considered. This occurs when acidic contents of the stomach come back up into the esophagus. Symptoms usually associated with GERD include heartburn, sour taste in the mouth, or a feeling of acid reflux in the chest, although, more than half of the people with cough from GERD do not have any other symptoms. An esophageal pH monitor can confirm the diagnosis of GERD. Sometimes GERD can complicate respiratory ailments related to cough, such as asthma or bronchitis. The treatment involves anti-acid medications and lifestyle changes with surgery indicated in cases not manageable with conservative measures.

=== Air pollution ===
Coughing may be caused by air pollution including tobacco smoke, particulate matter, irritant gases, and dampness in a home. The human health effects of poor air quality are far reaching, but principally affect the body's respiratory system and the cardiovascular system. Individual reactions to air pollutants depend on the type of pollutant a person is exposed to, the degree of exposure, the individual's health status and genetics. People who exercise outdoors on hot, smoggy days, for example, increase their exposure to pollutants in the air.

=== Foreign body ===
A foreign body can sometimes be suspected, for example if the cough started suddenly when the patient was eating. Rarely, sutures left behind inside the airway branches can cause coughing. A cough can be triggered by dryness from mouth breathing or recurrent aspiration of food into the windpipe in people with swallowing difficulties.

=== Drug-induced cough ===
Drugs used for treatments other than coughs, such as ACE inhibitors which are often used to treat high blood pressure, can sometimes cause cough as a side effect, and stopping their use will stop the cough. Beta blockers similarly cause cough as an adverse event.

=== Habit cough ===
A habit cough is one that responds to behavioral or psychiatric therapy after organic causes have been excluded. Absence of the cough during sleep is common, but not diagnostic. A tic cough is thought to be more common in children than in adults.

=== Neurogenic cough ===
Some cases of chronic cough may be attributed to a sensory neuropathic disorder. Treatment for neurogenic cough may include the use of certain neuralgia medications. Coughing may occur in tic disorders such as Tourette syndrome, although it should be distinguished from throat-clearing in this disorder.

=== Other ===
Cough may also be caused by conditions affecting the lung tissue such as bronchiectasis, cystic fibrosis, interstitial lung diseases and sarcoidosis. Coughing can also be triggered by benign or malignant lung tumors or mediastinal masses. Through irritation of the nerve, diseases of the external auditory canal (wax, for example) can also cause cough. Cardiovascular diseases associated with cough are heart failure, pulmonary infarction and aortic aneurysm. Nocturnal cough is associated with heart failure, as the left ventricle doesn't effectively pump blood forward, resulting in blood being backed up in the pulmonary veins, which in turn causing pulmonary edema and resultant cough. Other causes of nocturnal cough include asthma, post-nasal drip and gastroesophageal reflux disease (GERD). Another cause of cough occurring preferentially in supine position is recurrent aspiration. Cough can also be a symptom of mast cell activation syndrome (MCAS).

Given its irritant nature to mammal tissues, capsaicin is widely used to determine the cough threshold and as a tussive stimulant in clinical research of cough suppressants. Capsaicin is what makes chili peppers spicy, and might explain why workers in factories with these fruits can develop a cough.

Coughing may also be used for social reasons, and as such is not always involuntary. A voluntary cough, often written as "ahem", can be used to attract attention or express displeasure, as a form of nonverbal, paralingual metacommunication.

=== Airway clearance ===
Coughing, and huffing are important ways of removing mucus as sputum in many conditions such as cystic fibrosis, and chronic bronchitis.

== Pathophysiology ==
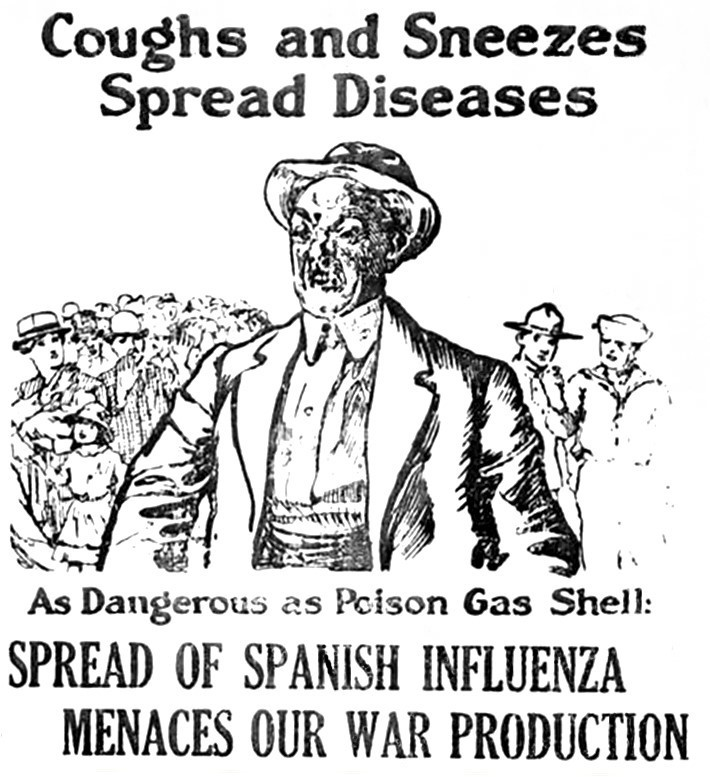
Coughing is viewed as a public health issue.

A cough is a protective reflex in healthy individuals which is influenced by psychological factors. The cough reflex is initiated by stimulation of two different classes of afferent nerves, namely the myelinated rapidly adapting receptors, and nonmyelinated C-fibers with endings in the lung.

== Diagnostic approach ==
The type of cough may help in the diagnosis. For instance, an inspiratory "whooping" sound on coughing almost doubles the likelihood that the illness is pertussis.

Blood may occur in small amounts with severe cough of many causes, but larger amounts suggests bronchitis, bronchiectasis, tuberculosis, or primary lung cancer.

Further workup may include labs, x-rays, and spirometry.

=== Classification ===
A cough can be classified by its duration, character, quality, and timing. The duration can be either acute (of sudden onset) if it is present less than three weeks, subacute if it is present between three or eight weeks, and chronic when lasting longer than eight weeks. A cough can be non-productive (dry) or productive (when phlegm is produced that may be coughed up as sputum). It may occur only at night (then called nocturnal cough), during both night and day, or just during the day.

A number of characteristic coughs exist. While these have not been found to be diagnostically useful in adults, they are of use in children. A barky cough is part of the common presentation of croup. A staccato cough has been classically described with neonatal chlamydial pneumonia.

== Treatment ==
The treatment of a cough in children is based on the underlying cause. In children half of cases go away without treatment in 10 days and 90% in 25 days.

According to the American Academy of Pediatrics the use of cough medicine to relieve cough symptoms is supported by little evidence and thus not recommended for treating cough symptoms in children. There is tentative evidence that the use of honey is better than no treatment or diphenhydramine in decreasing coughing. It does not alleviate coughing to the same extent as dextromethorphan but it shortens the cough duration better than placebo and salbutamol. A trial of antibiotics or inhaled corticosteroids may be tried in children with a chronic cough in an attempt to treat protracted bacterial bronchitis or asthma respectively. There is insufficient evidence to recommend treating children who have a cough that is not related to a specific condition with inhaled anti-cholinergics.

Because coughing can spread disease through infectious aerosol droplets, it is recommended to cover one's mouth and nose with the forearm, the inside of the elbow, a tissue or a handkerchief while coughing.

For cough relief, adults may take cough suppressants such as dextromethorphan.

Other common cough treatments include expectorants, decongestants, and antihistamines.

== Epidemiology ==
A cough is the most common reason for visiting a primary care physician in the United States.

== Other animals ==
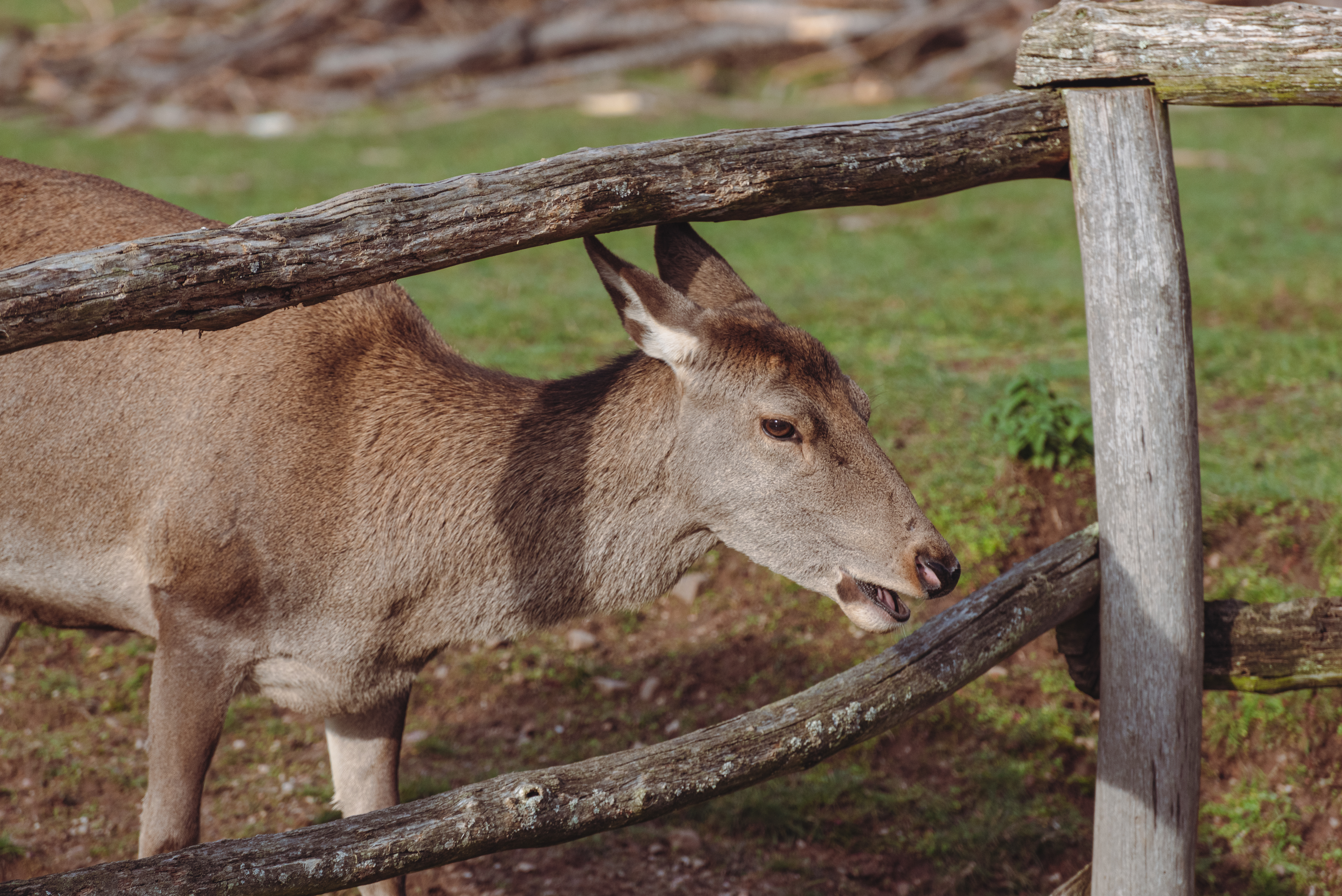
A coughing deer hind

Marine mammals such as dolphins and whales cannot cough. Some invertebrates such as insects and spiders cannot cough or sneeze. Crocodiles can cough. Domestic animals and vertebrates such as dogs and cats can cough, because of diseases, allergies, dust or choking. In particular, cats are known for coughing before spitting up a hairball.

In other domestic animals, horses can cough because of infections, or due to poor ventilation and dust in enclosed spaces. Kennel cough in dogs can result from a viral or bacterial infection.

Deer can cough similarly to humans as a result of respiratory tract infections, such as parasitic bronchitis caused by a species of Dictyocaulus.
