= Post-nasal drip =

- Other names: Upper airway cough syndrome, postnasal drainage, UACS, or post-nasal drip syndrome
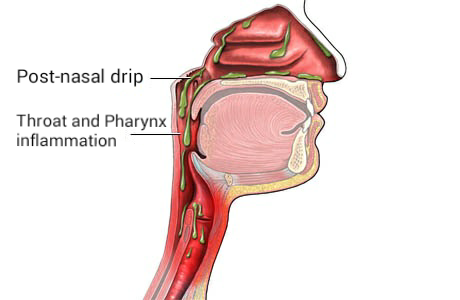
- Post-nasal drip
- Specialty: Otorhinolaryngology

Post-nasal drip (PND), also known as upper airway cough syndrome (UACS) or idiopathically as catarrh, occurs when excessive mucus is produced by the nasal mucosa. The excess mucus accumulates in the back of the nose, and eventually in the throat once it drips down the back of the throat. It can be caused by rhinitis, sinusitis, gastroesophageal reflux disease (GERD), or by a disorder of swallowing (such as an esophageal motility disorder). Other causes can be allergy, cold, flu, and side effects from medications.

However, some researchers argue that the flow of mucus down the back of the throat from the nasal cavity is a normal physiologic process that occurs in all healthy individuals. Some researchers challenge post-nasal drip as a syndrome and instead view it as a symptom, also taking into account variation across different societies. Furthermore, this rebuttal is reinforced because of the lack of an accepted definition, pathologic tissue changes, and available biochemical tests.

== Signs and symptoms ==
PND may present itself through the constant presence of discomfort in the upper airways. It is classically described as the sensation of a substance "dripping down the throat" and may also present with rhinorrhea, constant throat clearing, and cough, although its symptoms can be very nonspecific. PND is one of the most common etiologies for chronic cough, defined as a cough persisting beyond 8 weeks.

Post-nasal drip can be a cause of laryngeal inflammation and hyperresponsiveness, leading to symptoms of vocal cord dysfunction.

== Causes ==
There are multiple causes of PND, which can be acute or chronic.

=== GERD ===
Gastroesophageal reflux disease (GERD) is often associated with a high prevalence of upper-respiratory symptoms similar to those of PND, such as coughing, throat clearing, hoarseness and change in voice. Reflux causes throat irritation, leading to a sensation of increased mucus in the throat, which is believed to aggravate and, in some cases, cause post-nasal drip.

=== Allergic rhinitis ===
Allergic rhinitis (AR) is a common condition where exposure to allergens results in the release of inflammatory mediators, such as histamine, that causes sneezing, rhinorrhea, itchy eyes, and nasal congestion. The increased rhinorrhea and mucus production can result in PND.

=== Non-allergic rhinitis ===
Nonallergic rhinitis (NAR) is a condition in which there are symptoms of rhinitis, including rhinorrhea and nasal obstruction, but with negative skin and serum allergy testing results. It can be further categorized into:

- Non-allergic rhinitis with eosinophilia (NARES)
- Hormonal rhinitis (such as during pregnancy)
- Medication-induced rhinitis
- Atrophic rhinitis
- Irritant and occupational rhinitis (including tobacco smoke, cleaning supplies, etc.)
- Idiopathic nonallergic rhinitis

=== Rhinosinusitis ===
Rhinosinusitis is inflammation or infection of the sinus cavities. Acute rhinosinusitis has symptoms lasting less than four weeks, while chronic rhinosinusitis lasts greater than 12 weeks. This persistent irritation can lead to increased mucus production as a result of pro-inflammatory pathways, producing symptoms of PND.

== Mechanism ==
The exact mechanism of PND depends on its etiology, but usually involves increased production of mucus from the nasal mucosa. In addition to providing sense of smell, the nasal cavity serves to filter and regulate the temperature and humidity of inspired air. The nasal mucosa can produce secretions, or mucus, that provides lubrication and protection for the nasal cavity. This mucus production is activated by the autonomic nervous system; specifically, cholinergic neuropeptides are responsible for increasing mucus production. Excess mucus can drain posteriorly into the upper and lower airways, which, along with other physical and chemical irritants, can activate receptors in the respiratory tract that results in a protective physiological cough. In some patients, mucus recirculation between natural and accessory ostia has been described as a mechanism that perpetuates post-nasal drip and chronic rhinosinusitis.

== Diagnosis ==
Diagnosis of PND depends on both a detailed history and clinical examination to help determine its etiology. The history may begin with feelings of obstructed nasal breathing or "stuffy nose" with or without nasal discharge. If allergic rhinitis is suspected, a family history of allergic conditions as well as a personal history of other associated conditions such as food allergy, asthma, and atopic dermatitis can be evaluated. Allergic rhinitis classically has more symptoms of sneezing attacks, itchy eyes, and respiratory problems, although it is difficult to distinguish the different types of rhinitis by symptomology alone. Visual inspection can reveal mouth breathing, which is suggestive of nasal obstruction, or a horizontal crease across the nose (caused by the "allergic salute").

In the absence of any specific diagnostic tests, it may be difficult to diagnose PND from history of symptoms alone, as the etiology is broad and the symptoms may be very general. As such, suggestive procedures that highlight rhinitis and mucopurulent secretions, such as nasoendoscopy, may instead be utilized because of the vague nature of information available to directly attribute specific symptoms to the syndrome. In patients with accessory ostium recirculation, a condition often overlooked, careful nasal endoscopy may sometimes reveal a characteristic ring of mucus flow between adjacent openings.

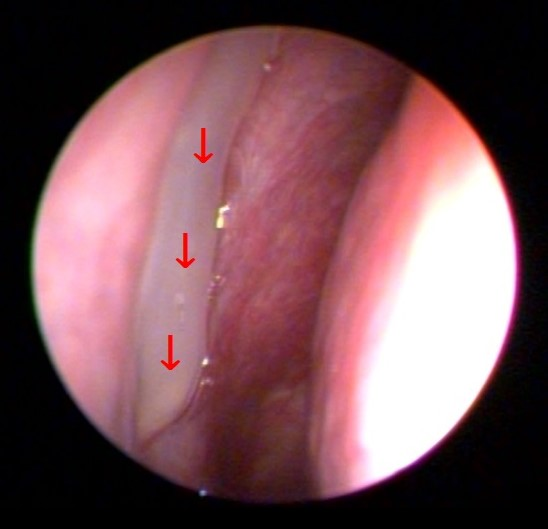
Nasal endoscopy shows that mucus emerging from the right maxillary ostium recirculates back into the maxillary sinus through an accessory ostium.

== Treatment ==
Treatment options depend on the nature of an individual's post-nasal drip and its cause. Antibiotics may be prescribed if the PND is the result of bacterial sinusitis. In cases where PND is caused by allergic rhinitis or irritant rhinitis, avoidance of allergens or irritating factors such as dander, cigarette smoke, and cleaning supplies may be beneficial. Antihistamines are particularly useful for allergic rhinitis and may be beneficial in some cases of non-allergic rhinitis. First-generation antihistamines such as chlorpheniramine and clemastine are more potent but have greater sedatory effects; later-generation antihistamines may be used to reduce these effects. Azelastine, a topical antihistamine, is approved for both allergic and non-allergic rhinitis due to its unique anti-inflammatory effects separate from its histamine receptor antagonism.

Intranasal steroids may also be beneficial in patients who do not respond to antihistamines. In one meta-analysis, intranasal steroids were shown to improve symptoms of non-allergic rhinitis at up to four weeks better than a placebo. Decongestants such as pseudoephedrine can tighten blood vessels of the nasal mucosa and result in a decrease in mucus production. Anticholinergics such as ipratropium bromide can help reduce secretions by blocking parasympathetic effects on the nasal mucosa.

One study has found that symptoms of postnasal drainage improved after 8 to 16 weeks of lansoprazole 30 mg taken twice daily regardless of the presence or absence of typical symptoms of GERD.

Other methods, such as drinking warm fluids and using saline nasal irrigation, may be useful for managing symptoms of PND but their exact efficacy is unclear in medical literature. Nevertheless, since postnasal drip is frequently associated with chronic rhinitis, the regular application of various saline solutions to the nasal cavity may be beneficial.

== Epidemiology ==
Because PND is often characterized as a "symptom" rather than a separate condition, the exact incidence is unknown and varies by its etiology. Chronic rhinitis, which includes allergic and non-allergic rhinitis, can affect 30-40% of the population. Non-allergic rhinitis is more common in females than in males.
