= Common cold =

Common viral infection of the upper respiratory tract

- Other names: Cold, acute viral nasopharyngitis, nasopharyngitis, viral rhinitis, rhinopharyngitis, acute coryza, head cold, upper respiratory tract infection (URTI)
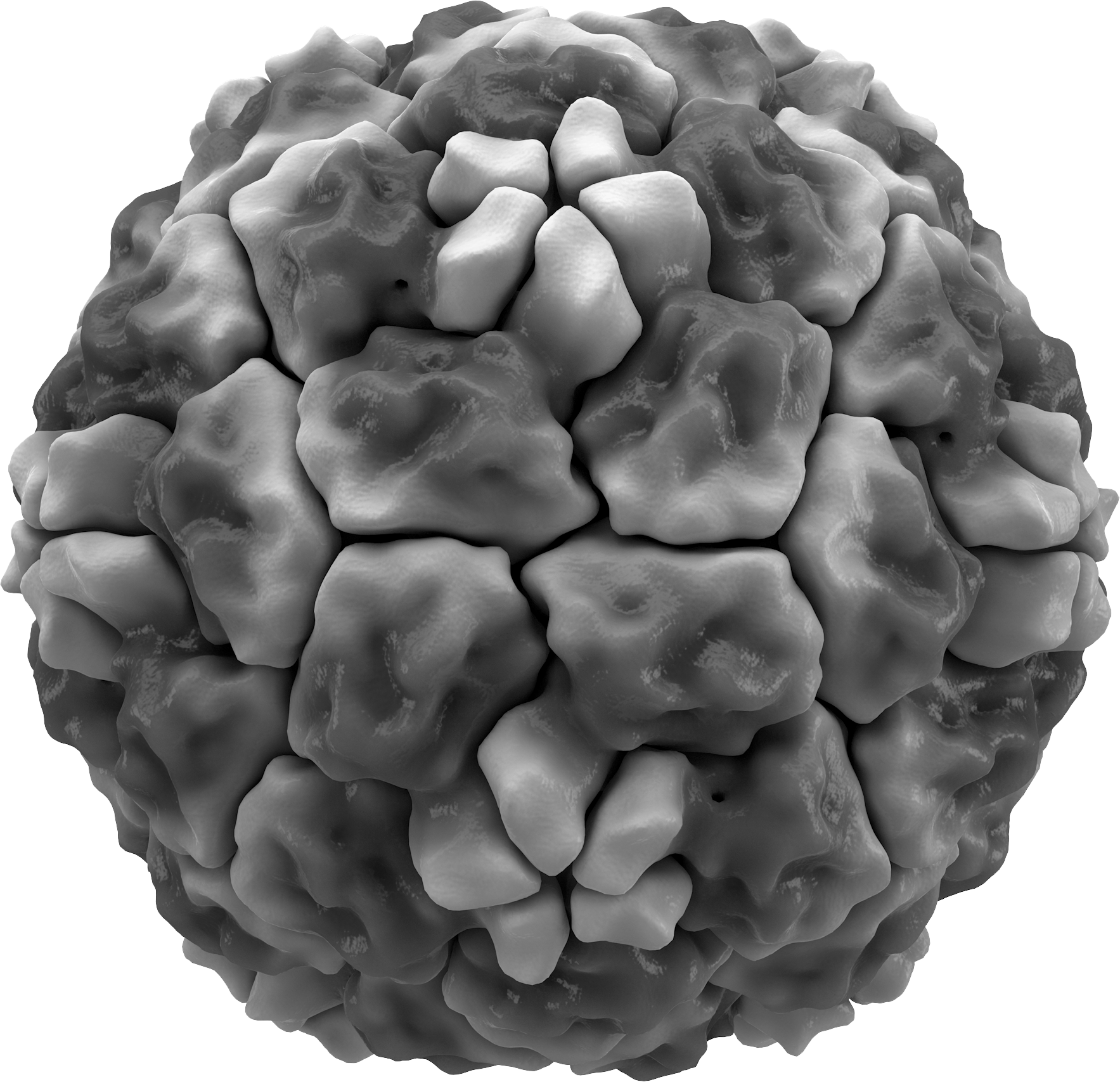
- A representation of the molecular surface of one variant of human rhinovirus
- Specialty: Infectious disease, family medicine
- Symptoms: Cough, sore throat, runny nose, fever, muscle aches, fatigue, headache, anorexia
- Complications: Usually none, but occasionally otitis media, sinusitis, pneumonia and sepsis can occur
- Usual onset: ~2 days from exposure
- Duration: 1–3 weeks
- Causes: Viral (usually rhinovirus)
- Diagnostic method: Based on symptoms
- Differential diagnosis: Allergic rhinitis, bronchitis, bronchiolitis, pertussis, sinusitis
- Prevention: Hand washing, cough etiquette, vitamin C
- Treatment: Symptomatic therapy, zinc
- Medication: NSAIDs
- Frequency: 2–3 per year (adults); 6–8 per year (children)

The common cold, or simply a cold, is a viral infectious disease of the upper respiratory tract that primarily affects the respiratory mucosa of the nose, throat, sinuses, and larynx. Signs and symptoms may appear in as little as two days after exposure to the virus. These may include coughing, sore throat, runny nose, sneezing, headache, fatigue, and fever. People usually recover in seven to ten days, but some symptoms may last up to three weeks. Occasionally, those with other health problems may develop pneumonia. When general symptoms are systemic and the disease is severe, the term "flu-like" or "influenza-like illness" can be used instead.

Well over 200 virus strains are implicated in causing the common cold, with enteroviruses (especially rhinoviruses), coronaviruses, and adenoviruses being the most common. They spread through the air or indirectly through contact with objects in the environment, followed by transfer to the mouth or nose. Risk factors include going to child care facilities, not sleeping well, and psychological stress. The symptoms are mostly due to the body's immune response to the infection rather than to tissue destruction by the viruses themselves. The symptoms of influenza are similar to those of a cold, although usually more severe and less likely to include a runny nose.

There is no vaccine for the common cold. This is due to the rapid mutation and wide variation of viruses that cause the common cold. The primary methods of prevention are hand washing; not touching the eyes, nose or mouth with unwashed hands; and staying away from sick people. People are considered contagious as long as the symptoms are still present. Some evidence supports the use of face masks. There is also no cure, but the symptoms can be treated. Zinc may reduce the duration and severity of symptoms if started shortly after the onset of symptoms. Nonsteroidal anti-inflammatory drugs (NSAIDs) such as ibuprofen may help with pain. Antibiotics, however, should not be used, as all colds are caused by viruses rather than bacteria. There is no good evidence that cough medicines prevent or reduce the duration of a cold.

The common cold is the most frequent infectious disease in humans. Under normal circumstances, the average adult gets two to three colds a year, while the average child may get six to eight colds a year. Infections occur more commonly during the winter. These infections have existed throughout human history.

== Signs and symptoms ==
The typical symptoms of a cold include cough, runny nose, sneezing, nasal congestion, and a sore throat, sometimes accompanied by muscle ache, fatigue, headache, and loss of appetite. A sore throat is present in about 40% of cases, a cough in about 50%, and muscle aches in about 50%. In adults, a fever is generally not present but it is common in infants and young children. The cough is usually mild compared to that accompanying influenza. While a cough and a fever indicate a higher likelihood of influenza in adults, a great deal of similarity exists between these two conditions. A number of the viruses that cause the common cold may also result in asymptomatic infections.

The color of the mucus or nasal secretion may vary from clear to yellow to green and does not show whether the infection is viral or bacterial.

=== Progression ===
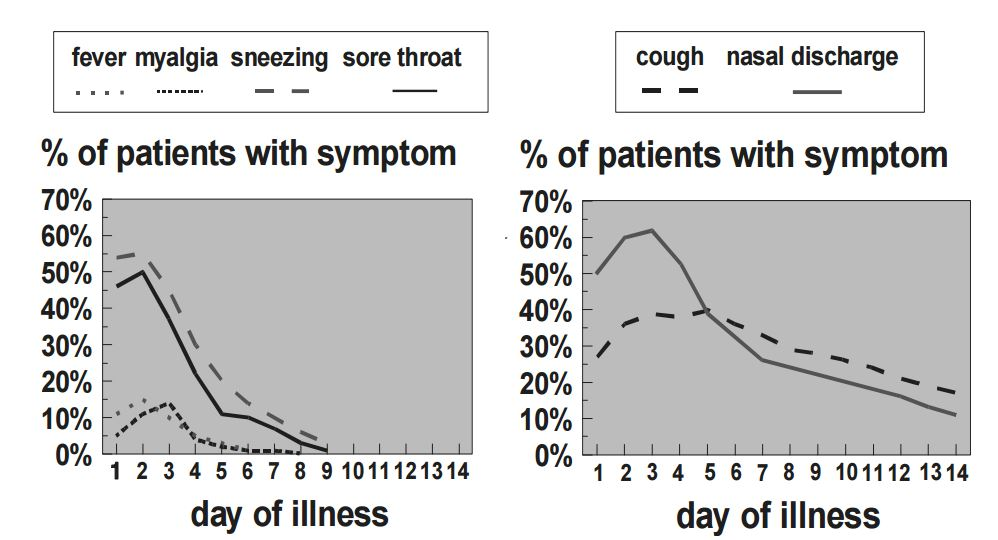
Cold symptoms over time

A cold usually begins with fatigue, a feeling of being chilled, sneezing, and a headache, followed in a couple of days by a runny nose and cough. Symptoms may begin within sixteen hours of exposure and typically peak two to four days after onset. They usually resolve in seven to ten days, but some can last for up to three weeks. The average duration of cough is eighteen days and in some cases people develop a post-viral cough which can linger after the infection is gone. In children, the cough lasts for more than ten days in 35–40% of cases and continues for more than 25 days in 10%.

== Causes ==
=== Viruses ===
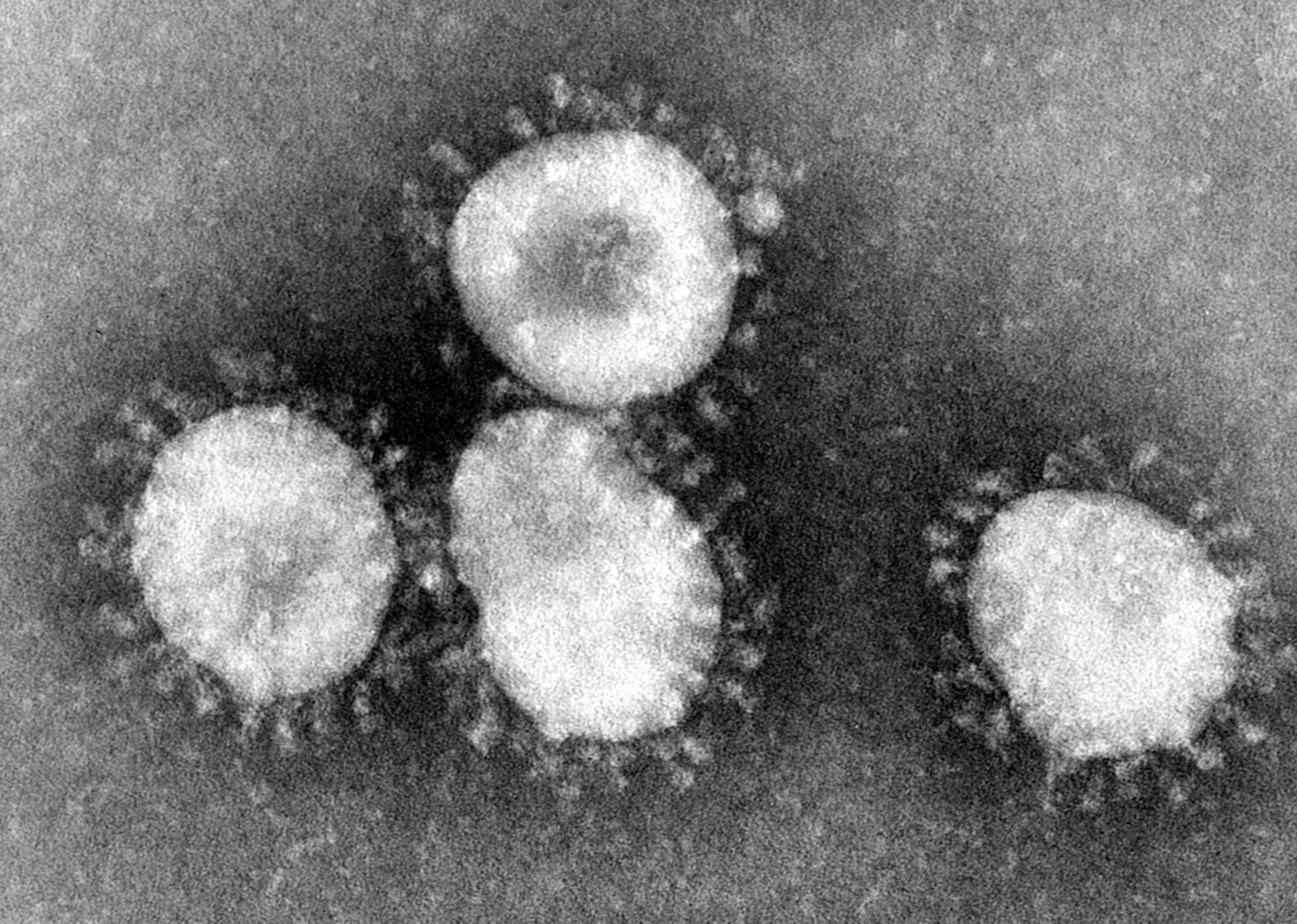
Coronaviruses are a group of viruses known for causing the common cold. They have a halo or crown-like (corona) appearance when viewed under an electron microscope.

The common cold is an infection of the upper respiratory tract which can be caused by many different viruses. The most common are rhinoviruses (up to 40%) which have over 100 known serotypes (variations). Other common viruses include coronaviruses, adenoviruses, enteroviruses, parainfluenza, and RSV. Frequently, more than one virus is present. In total, more than 200 viral types are associated with colds. The viral cause of some common colds (20–30%) is unknown.

=== Transmission ===
The common cold is transmitted by airborne droplets, or contact with nasal secretions or contaminated objects. Breathing, talking, or coughing causes an infected individual to release small droplets which carry the virus. These droplets can directly infect someone if they are inhaled or come in contact with their eyes or nose. The viruses may survive on surfaces for prolonged periods (over 18 hours for rhinoviruses) and can be picked up by people's hands and carried to their eyes or noses to cause infection.

Transmission from animals is considered highly unlikely; an outbreak documented at a British scientific base on Adelaide Island after seventeen weeks of isolation was thought to have been caused by transmission from a contaminated object or an asymptomatic human carrier, rather than from the husky dogs which were also present at the base.

Transmission is common in daycare and schools due to the proximity of many children with little immunity and poor hygiene. These infections are then brought home to other members of the family. There is no evidence that recirculated air during commercial flight is a method of transmission. People sitting close to each other appear to be at greater risk of infection.

=== Other ===
Herd immunity, generated from previous exposure to cold viruses, plays an important role in limiting viral spread, as seen with younger populations that have greater rates of respiratory infections. Poor immune function is a risk factor for disease. Insufficient sleep and malnutrition have been associated with a greater risk of developing infection following rhinovirus exposure; this is believed to be due to their effects on immune function. A mother with the common cold cannot transmit it through her breast milk, and by the time she is showing symptoms the baby has already been exposed to the virus. As such it is recommended a breastfeeding mother with a cold continue breastfeeding. It is also recommended that breast feeding be continued when an infant has a cold. In the developed world, breastfeeding may not be protective against the common cold in and of itself.

== Pathophysiology ==
The common cold is a disease of the upper respiratory tract.

The symptoms of the common cold are believed to be primarily related to the immune response to the virus. The mechanism of this immune response is virus-specific. For example, the rhinovirus is typically acquired by direct contact; it binds to humans via ICAM-1 receptors and the CDHR3 receptor through unknown mechanisms to trigger the release of inflammatory mediators. These inflammatory mediators then produce the symptoms. It does not generally cause damage to the nasal epithelium (a thin, protective layer of cells on the surface of the nose). The respiratory syncytial virus (RSV), on the other hand, is contracted by direct contact and airborne droplets. It then replicates in the nose and throat before spreading to the lower respiratory tract. RSV does cause epithelium damage. Human parainfluenza virus typically results in inflammation of the nose, throat, and bronchi. In young children, when it affects the trachea, it may produce the symptoms of croup, due to the small size of their airways.

== Diagnosis ==
The distinction between viral upper respiratory tract infections is loosely based on the location of symptoms, with the common cold affecting primarily the nose (rhinitis), throat (pharyngitis), and lungs (bronchitis). There can be significant overlap, and more than one area can be affected. Self-diagnosis is frequent. Isolation of the viral agent involved is rarely performed, and it is generally not possible to identify the virus type through symptoms.

== Prevention ==
The only useful ways to reduce the spread of cold viruses are physical and engineering measures such as using correct hand washing technique, respirators, and improvement of indoor air. In the healthcare environment, gowns and disposable gloves are also used. Droplet precautions cannot reliably protect against inhalation of common cold–laden aerosols. Instead, airborne precautions such as respirators, ventilation, HEPA, and high MERV filters are the only reliable protection against cold-laden aerosols. Isolation or quarantine is not used as the disease is so widespread and symptoms are non-specific. There is no vaccine to protect against the common cold. Vaccination has proven difficult as there are so many viruses involved and because they mutate rapidly. Creation of a broadly effective vaccine is, therefore, highly improbable.

Regular hand washing appears to be effective in reducing the transmission of cold viruses, especially among children. Whether the addition of antivirals or antibacterials to normal hand washing provides greater benefit is unknown. Wearing face masks when around people who are infected may be beneficial; however, there is insufficient evidence for maintaining a greater social distance. Zinc supplements do not seem to affect the likelihood of contracting a cold.

== Management ==
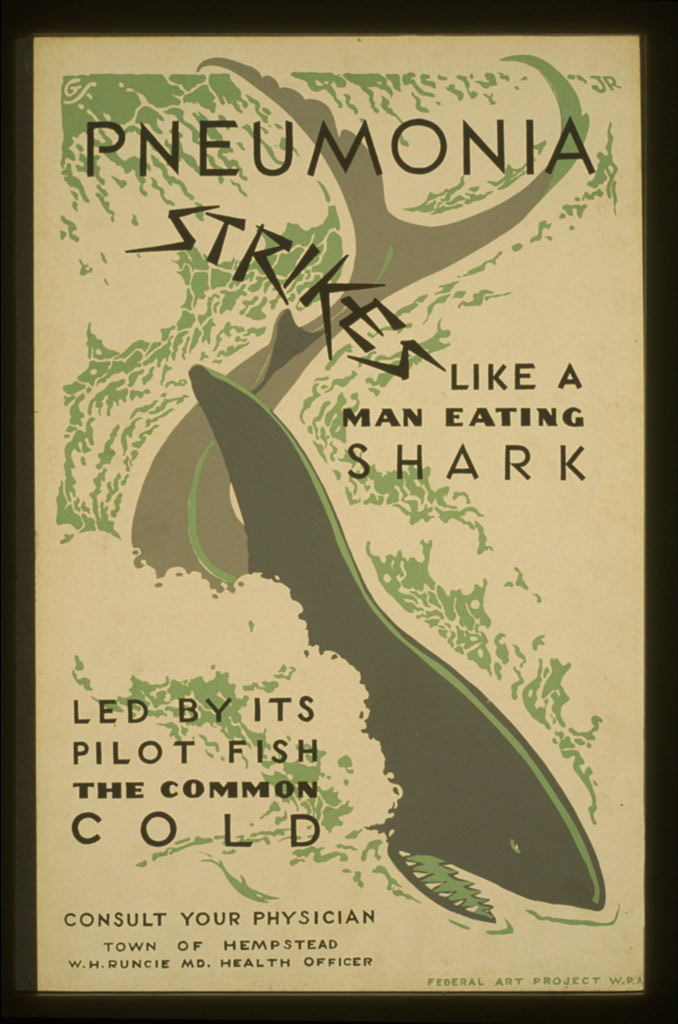
Poster from 1937 encouraging citizens to "consult your physician" for treatment of the common cold

There is no cure for the common cold. Treatment for the common cold primarily involves medications and other therapies to relieve symptoms. Getting plenty of rest, drinking fluids to maintain hydration, and gargling with warm salt water are reasonable conservative measures. Much of the benefit from symptomatic treatment is, however, attributed to the placebo effect. Other than zinc, no medications or herbal remedies have been shown to reliably shorten the duration of a cold, although several can reduce the severity of individual symptoms.

=== Symptomatic ===
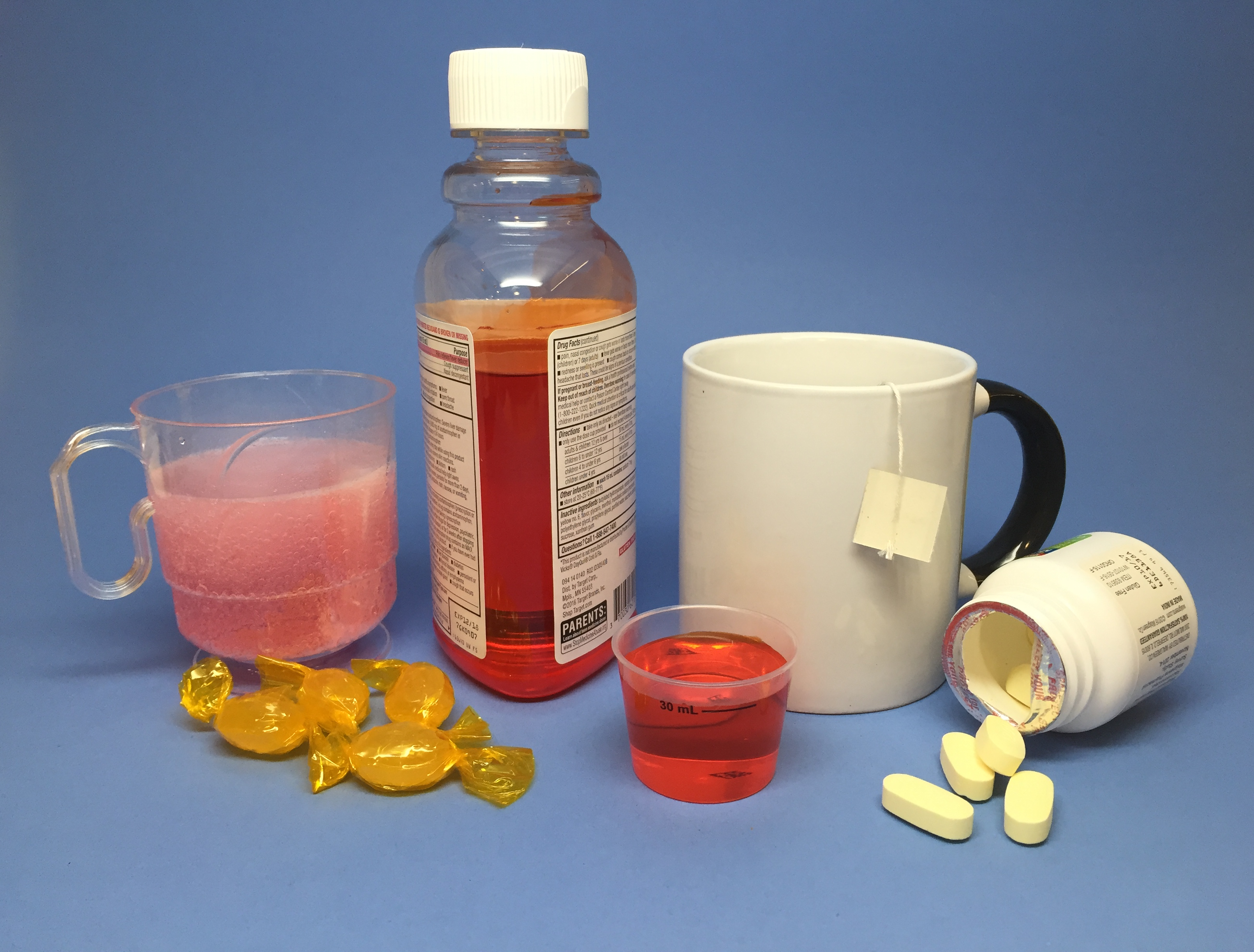
Various treatments for the common cold – liquid and pill cold medicine, tea, throat lozenges, and over-the-counter decongestants

Treatments that may help with symptoms include pain medication and medications for fevers such as ibuprofen and acetaminophen (paracetamol). However, it is not clear whether acetaminophen helps with symptoms. It is not known if over-the-counter cough medications are effective for treating an acute cough. Cough medicines are not recommended for use in children due to a lack of evidence supporting effectiveness and the potential for harm. In 2009, Canada restricted the use of over-the-counter cough and cold medication in children six years and under due to concerns regarding risks and unproven benefits. The misuse of dextromethorphan (an over-the-counter cough medicine) has led to its ban in a number of countries. Intranasal corticosteroids have not been found to be useful.

In adults, short term use of nasal decongestants may have a small benefit. Antihistamines may improve symptoms in the first day or two; however, there is no longer-term benefit and they have adverse effects such as drowsiness. Other decongestants such as pseudoephedrine appear effective in adults. Combined oral analgesics, antihistaminics, and decongestants are generally effective for older children and adults. Ipratropium nasal spray may reduce the symptoms of a runny nose but has little effect on stuffiness. Ipratropium may also help with coughs in adults. The safety and effectiveness of nasal decongestant use in children is unclear.

Due to lack of studies, it is not known whether increased fluid intake improves symptoms or shortens respiratory illness. As of 2017, heated and humidified air, such as via RhinoTherm, is of unclear benefit. A small randomized trial found that chest vapor rub may provide some relief of nocturnal cough, congestion, and sleep difficulty in children; subsequent reviews have characterized the underlying evidence as low quality.

Some experts advise against physical exercise if there are symptoms such as fever, widespread muscle aches, or fatigue. It is regarded as safe to perform moderate exercise if the symptoms are confined to the head, including runny nose, nasal congestion, sneezing, or a minor sore throat. There is a popular belief that having a hot drink can help with cold symptoms, but evidence to support this is very limited.

=== Antibiotics and antivirals ===
Antibiotics have no effect against viral infections, including the common cold. Due to their side effects, antibiotics cause overall harm but nevertheless are still frequently prescribed. The common prescription of antibiotics for colds significantly increases the development of antibiotic resistance. Some of the reasons that antibiotics are so commonly prescribed include people's expectations for them, physicians' desire to help, and the difficulty in excluding complications that may be amenable to antibiotics. There are no effective antiviral drugs for the common cold even though some preliminary research has shown benefits.

=== Zinc ===
Zinc supplements taken as pills may shorten the duration of colds by up to 33% and reduce the severity of symptoms if supplementation begins within 24 hours of the onset of symptoms. Some zinc remedies directly applied to the inside of the nose have led to the loss of the sense of smell. A 2017 review did not recommend the use of zinc for the common cold for various reasons; whereas a 2017 and 2018 review both recommended the use of zinc, but also advocated further research on the topic.

=== Alternative medicine ===
While there are many alternative medicines and Chinese herbal medicines supposed to treat the common cold, there is insufficient scientific evidence to support their use.

As of 2015, there is weak evidence to support nasal irrigation with saline. There is no firm evidence that Echinacea products or garlic provide any meaningful benefit in treating or preventing colds.

=== Vitamins C and D ===
Vitamin C supplementation does not affect the incidence of the common cold, but may reduce its duration if taken on a regular basis. There is no conclusive evidence that vitamin D supplementation is efficacious in the prevention or treatment of respiratory tract infections.

== Prognosis ==
The common cold is generally mild and self-limiting with most symptoms generally improving in a week. In children, half of cases resolve in 10 days and 90% in 15 days. Severe complications, if they occur, are usually in the very old, the very young, or those who are immunosuppressed. Secondary bacterial infections may occur resulting in sinusitis, pharyngitis, or an ear infection. It is estimated that sinusitis occurs in 8% and ear infection in 30% of cases.

== Epidemiology ==
The common cold is the most common human disease and affects people all over the globe. Adults typically have two to three infections annually, and children may have six to eight colds a year. Rates of symptomatic infections increase in the elderly due to declining immunity. Common cold viruses have an estimated basic reproduction number ($R_0$) 2–3, meaning that each infected person typically infects 2–3 others.

=== Weather ===
A common misconception is that one can "catch a cold" merely through prolonged exposure to cold weather. Although it is now known that colds are viral infections, the prevalence of many such viruses is indeed seasonal, occurring more frequently during cold weather. The reason for the seasonality has not been conclusively determined. Possible explanations may include cold temperature-induced changes in the respiratory system, decreased immune response, and low humidity causing an increase in viral transmission rates, perhaps due to dry air allowing small viral droplets to disperse farther and stay in the air longer.

The apparent seasonality may also be due to social factors, such as people spending more time indoors near infected people, and especially children at school. Although normal exposure to cold temperatures does not increase one's risk of infection, severe exposure leading to significant reduction of body temperature (hypothermia) may put one at a greater risk for the common cold; although controversial, the majority of evidence suggests that it may increase susceptibility to infection.

== History ==
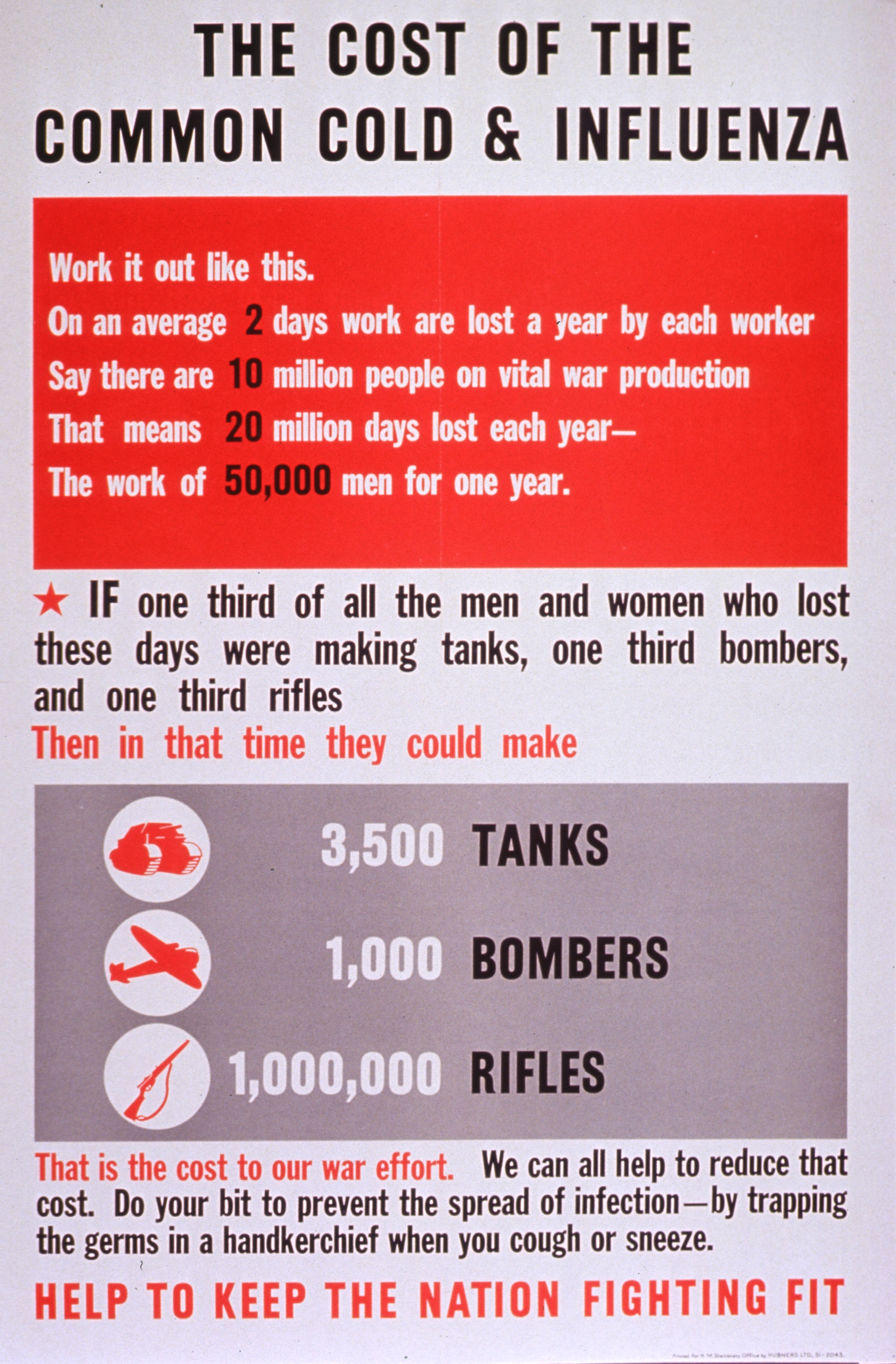
A British poster from World War II describing the cost of the common cold

While the cause of the common cold was identified in the 1950s, the disease appears to have been with humanity since its early history. Its symptoms and treatment are described in the Egyptian Ebers papyrus, the oldest existing medical text, written before the 16th century BCE. The name "cold" came into use in the 16th century, due to the similarity between its symptoms and those of exposure to cold weather.

In the United Kingdom, the Common Cold Unit (CCU) was set up by the Medical Research Council in 1946 and it was where the rhinovirus was discovered in 1956. In the 1970s, the CCU demonstrated that treatment with interferon during the incubation phase of rhinovirus infection protects somewhat against the disease, but no practical treatment could be developed. The unit was closed in 1989, two years after it completed research of zinc gluconate lozenges in the prevention and treatment of rhinovirus colds, the only successful treatment in the history of the unit.

== Research directions ==
Antivirals have been tested for effectiveness in the common cold; as of 2009, none had been both found effective and licensed for use. There are trials of the anti-viral drug pleconaril which shows promise against picornaviruses as well as trials of BTA-798. The oral form of pleconaril had safety issues and an aerosol form is being studied. The genomes of all known human rhinovirus strains have been sequenced.

== Societal impact ==
The economic impact of the common cold is not well understood in much of the world. In the United States, the common cold leads to 75–100 million physician visits annually at a conservative cost estimate of $7.7 billion per year. Americans spend $2.9 billion on over-the-counter drugs and another $400 million on prescription medicines for symptom relief. More than one-third of people who saw a doctor received an antibiotic prescription, which has implications for antibiotic resistance. An estimated 22–189 million school days are missed annually due to a cold. As a result, parents missed 126 million workdays to stay at home to care for their children. When added to the 150 million workdays missed by employees who have a cold, the total economic impact of cold-related work loss exceeds $20 billion per year. This accounts for 40% of time lost from work in the United States.

== See also ==
- Influenza
- COVID-19
- Norovirus
