= OmniVis =

US biotech company

- Industry: Biotechnology
- Founded: 2017
- Headquarters: San Francisco
- Key people: Katherine Clayton, CEO

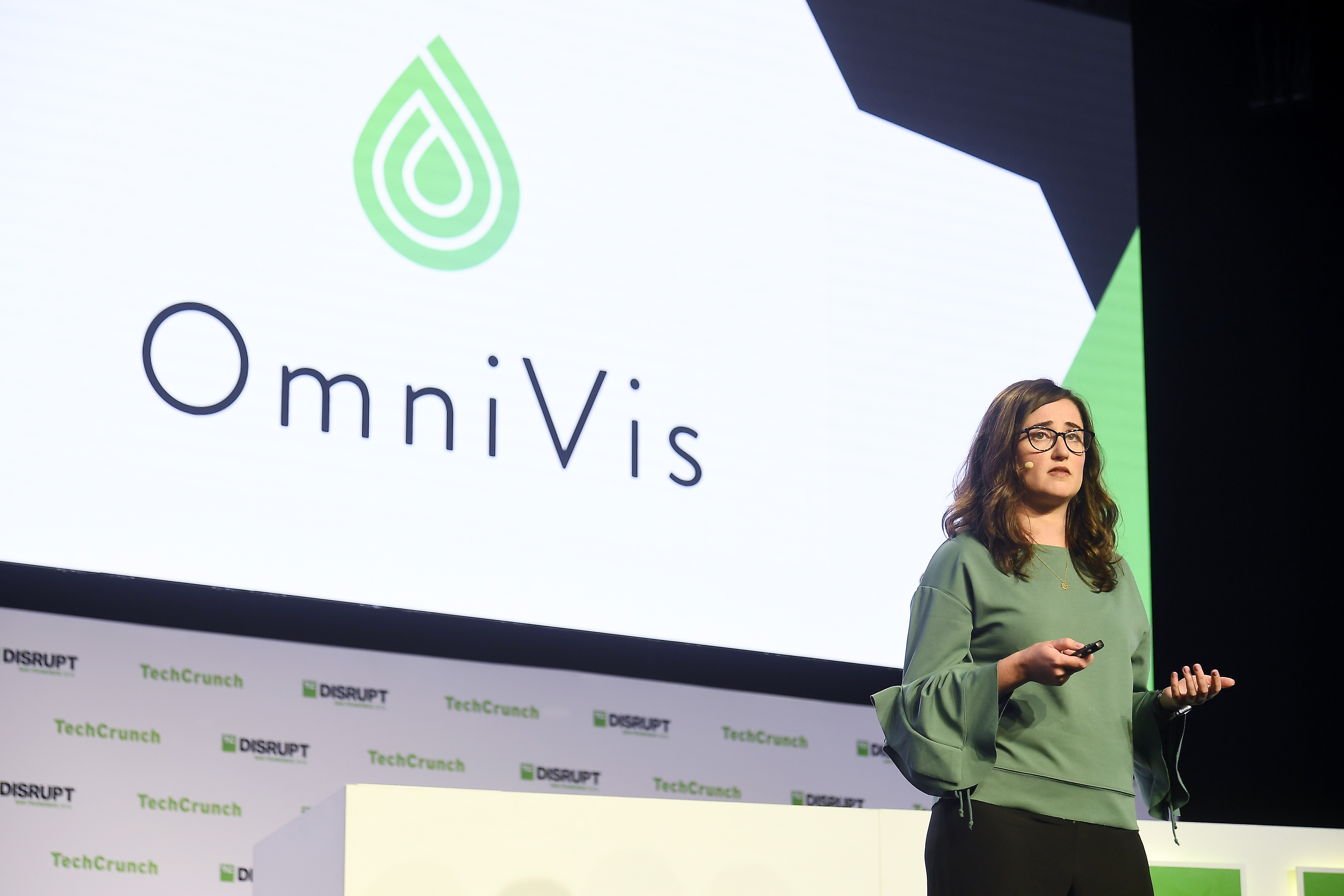
Dr Katherine Clayton of OmniVis at TechCrunch Disrupt San Francisco 2019

OmniVis is a South San Francisco based biotechnology company that specializes in rapid medical diagnostic tests. Co-founded by Dr. Katherine Clayton, a Purdue College of Engineering graduate alumna, and three professors, OmniVis produces cholera test and is working on COVID-19 tests.

== Products ==
=== Cholera detection ===
OmnniVis's rapid Cholera detection device can identify the presence of Vibrio cholerae in water in less than one hour. The device uses a process of DNA amplification and viscosity measurement.

The processing is done via a smartphone enabled platform that analyzes water samples inserted into a single-use test kit element. In May 2019, OmniVis teamed up with the International Cetre for Diarrhoeal Disease Research, Bangladesh to beta test the technology.

=== COVID-19 detection ===
In May 2020, OmniVis was working on the early stages of a rapid test for COVID-19 that detects the disease in human saliva. The rapid tests uses a smartphone for processing. The project was supported by the United States Department of Agriculture. From June 2020, OmniVis was also working on a United States National Science Foundation funded initiative to detect COVID-19 from nasal swabs.
