= Responses to the COVID-19 pandemic in February 2022 =

Aspect of viral disease pandemic

This article documents the chronology of the response to the COVID-19 pandemic in February 2022, which originated in Wuhan, China in December 2019. Some developments may become known or fully understood only in retrospect. Reporting on this pandemic began in December 2019.

== Reactions and measures in the Eastern Mediterranean ==
=== 20 February ===
- Israeli Prime Minister Naftali Bennett has announced that Israel will allow all tourists regardless of their vaccination status to enter the country from 1 March 2022. Tourists entering Israel will be required to undergo polymerase chain reaction (PCR) testing prior to and after entering Israel.

== Reactions and measures in South, East and Southeast Asia ==
=== 3 February ===
- Malaysia launched its mass vaccination programme for children aged between five and 11 years in order to protect the health of its youngest members and to boost its high national vaccination rate.

== Reactions and measures in the Western Pacific ==
=== 1 February ===
- The Tongan Government has announced that the island country would go into lockdown at 6pm on 2 February after two positive cases were detected.

=== 3 February ===
- New Zealand Prime Minister Jacinda Ardern announced a five-stage plan to reopen the country's borders between late February and October 2022 by extending self-isolation to vaccinated New Zealand citizens and residents followed by travellers from all over the world. Unvaccinated travellers will be required to undergo managed isolation.

=== 14 February ===
- New Zealand Prime Minister Ardern announced that the country would move to Phase Two of the Government's Omicron plan at 11.59pm on 15 February. Under Phase Two, the self-isolation period for positive cases will be reduced from 14 to 10 days and 10 to seven days for contacts. In addition, critical workers will be allowed to resume work if they can return daily rapid antigen tests.
- The New Zealand Government announced that fully vaccinated New Zealanders returning from Australia will only need to spend seven days in isolation from late February 2022.
- The NZ Government removed Tonga from its quarantine free travel list due to rising cases in the island country. Tongans entering the country from 15 February will have to undergo rapid antigen testing while those entering from 22 February will be required to self-isolate for seven days and undergo rapid antigen testing.

=== 20 February ===
- Australian Prime Minister Scott Morrison announced that the country's borders would be reopened to international tourists and business travellers from 21 February.

=== 24 February ===
- New Zealand's COVID-19 Response Minister Chris Hipkins has announced that the country will enter "phase three" of its Omicron response plan at 11:59 pm on 24 February in response to rising case numbers. Under phase three, only confirmed cases and their household contacts will be required to isolate. In addition, rapid antigen testing will be rolled out to the public.

=== 28 February ===
- The New Zealand Cabinet announced plans to accelerate the reopening of the country's borders and eliminate self-isolation requirements. From 3 March, vaccinated travellers will not be required to self-isolate. From 5 March, New Zealanders and other eligible critical workers will be able to enter the country. From 13 March, most temporary visa holders including working holiday visa and Recognised Seasonal Employer workers will be able to enter without having to self-isolate.

== See also ==
- Timeline of the COVID-19 pandemic in February 2022
- Responses to the COVID-19 pandemic
