= OraQuick =

Brand of at-home HIV test

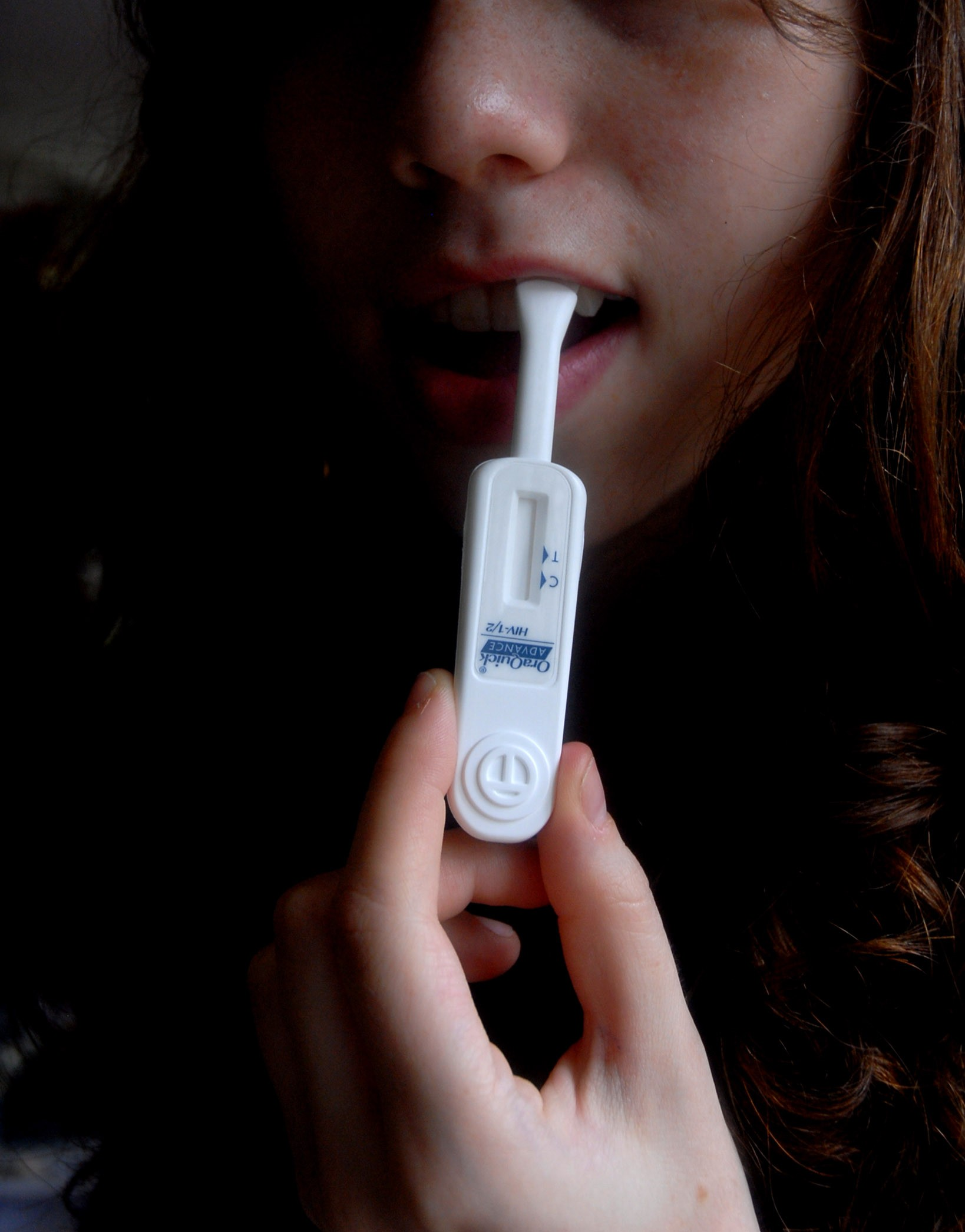
- Demonstration of the OraQuick rapid HIV test
- Current owner: OraSure Technologies
- Introduced: 2002
- Website: oraquick.com

OraQuick is an at-home HIV test manufactured by Orasure Technologies that was approved by the United States Food and Drug Administration for use by medical professionals in 2002 and for at-home use in 2012. It is one of only two at-home HIV tests available. OraQuick can be purchased by anyone above aged 17 over-the-counter at any major retail stores or online.

As of November 2018, the testing kit costs on average about $40-45. The United States Food and Drug Administration states that even though an individual can use the HIV test kit as a primary test measure, it is still important to see a medical professional for secondary testing.

OraQuick measures the HIV antibodies in oral fluid, but not saliva. The test kit contains an oral swab attached to the reader, and a fluid-filled test tube. The test results can either be invalid, positive, or negative.

== History ==
On November 7, 2002, the FDA approved the OraQuick test as the first rapid point-of-care HIV test, providing results in as little as 20 minutes using whole-blood specimens obtained from a fingerstick or venipuncture. Prior to this approval, HIV tests required blood samples to be sent to a laboratory, resulting in longer wait times for results. In 2004, the FDA expanded its use to include oral fluid samples, improving accessibility for individuals hesitant to undergo blood testing. In July 2012, the test received approval for over-the-counter use, allowing individuals to perform it at home with a mouth swab.

== Principle ==
The OraQuick ADVANCE Rapid HIV-1/2 Antibody Test is a single-use, qualitative immunoassay that can be purchased over-the-counter (OTC). This test kit contains a test swab that collects oral fluid containing antibodies for HIV-1 and HIV-2 from the user’s gums. The material is gathered and combined with buffered developer solution in a test tube. After 20 to 40 minutes, the mixture moves up the test strip, and the findings are visible. The C-Line indicates that the mixture is migrating up the test strip adequately and the test is properly working. The T-Line contains antigens immobilized on a nitrocellulose membrane that HIV antibodies can react to.

If a dark C-Line appears, then the test is working. The results are negative if only a C-Line is present. The results are positive if both a C-Line and T-Line appear. Since a positive result does not necessarily indicate HIV-positive status, a follow-up test should be done in a medical setting to confirm the test results. An initial positive result is not a definitive HIV diagnosis, but rather it should prompt the user to seek immediate medical attention for HIV blood tests and follow-ups. A negative result indicates no HIV infection, but the test cannot accurately detect HIV levels when exposure was within the past 3 months. Even then, there can still be false negatives.

== Accuracy ==
Testing performance

In a clinical study, trained professionals compared HIV test results of OraQuick In-Home HIV Test with results from laboratory testing. The study was conducted on 4,999 participants and found OraQuick testing correctly generated a negative result 4,902 times out of the 4,903 times laboratory testing generated a negative result (99.9%). OraQuick testing generated a positive result 88 times out of 96 times that laboratory testing generated a positive result (91.7%). Researchers saw subjects failed to obtain any test result 56 times in 5,055 instances (1.1%). OraQuick In-Home HIV Testing is expected to provide accurate results at 3 months from exposure since this is the amount of time it takes for people to develop antibodies to HIV. A negative test result does not confirm individuals are not infected by HIV. There is a window period of approximately 3 months when individuals are still not producing enough antibodies to generate a positive result, thus it is recommended to test regularly.

False positives

Lyme disease, syphilis, lupus, and other conditions can contribute to false positive results.

False negatives

Testing too soon after exposure (window period), low antibody levels, antiviral therapy, and testing within 30 minutes of eating or drinking can all contribute to false negative results.
