= Rapid antigen test =

Fast medical lateral flow test

- Synonyms: Rapid antigen detection test (RADT), lateral flow test, lateral flow device, rapid test, Antigen rapid test
- Purpose: To diagnose infections

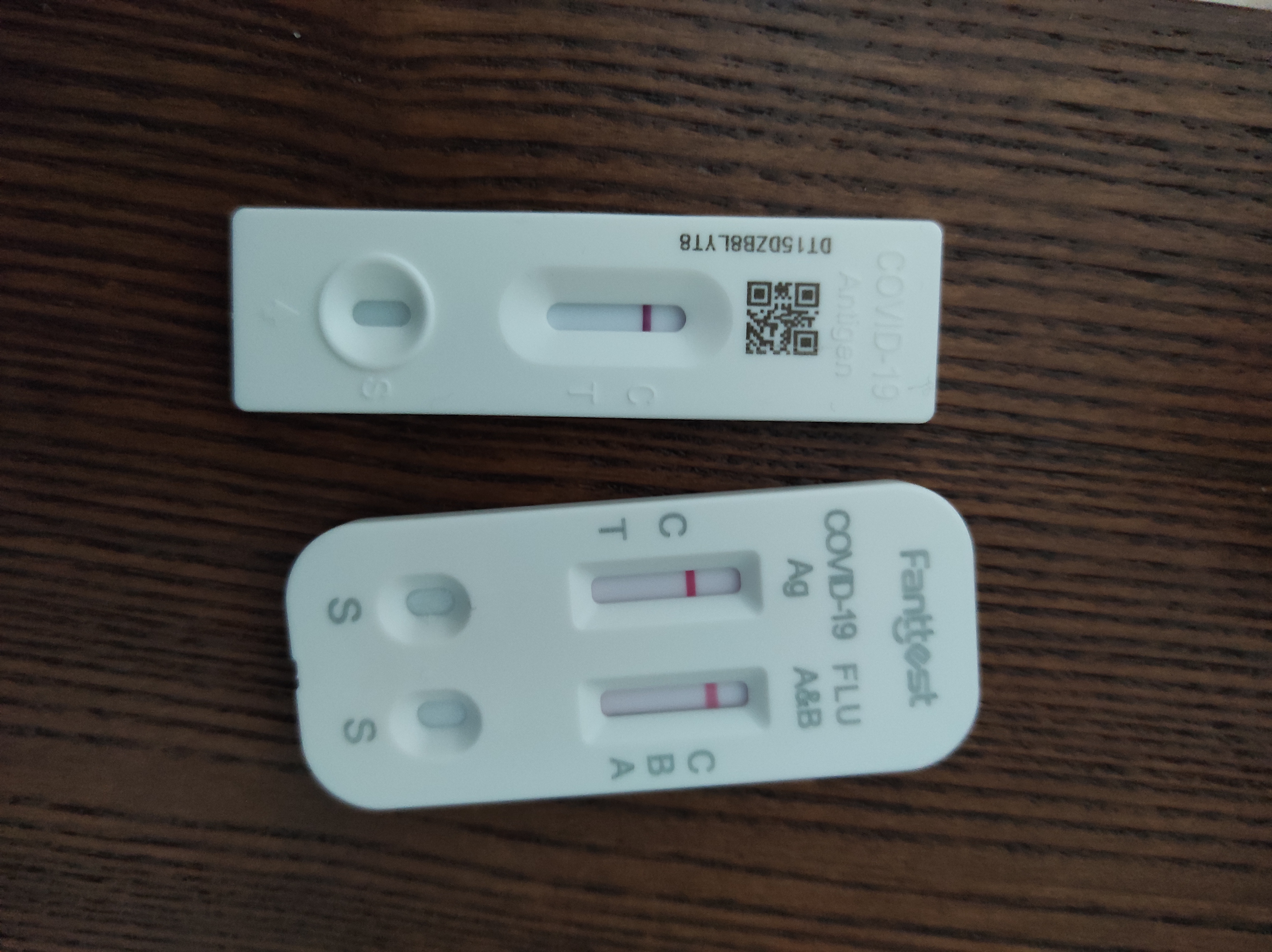
A COVID-19 Rapid Antigen test (top) with a COVID-19 Rapid Antigen/Influenza A&B Rapid Antigen Test (bottom)

A rapid antigen test (RAT), sometimes called a rapid antigen detection test (RADT), antigen rapid test (ART), or loosely just a rapid test, is a rapid diagnostic test suitable for point-of-care testing that directly detects the presence or absence of an antigen. RATs are a type of lateral flow test detecting antigens, rather than antibodies (antibody tests) or nucleic acid (nucleic acid tests). Rapid tests generally give a result in 5 to 30 minutes, require minimal training or infrastructure, and have significant cost advantages. Rapid antigen tests for the detection of SARS-CoV-2, the virus that causes COVID-19, have been commonly used since the COVID-19 pandemic.

For many years, an early and major class of RATs—the rapid strep tests for streptococci—were so often the referent when RATs or RADTs were mentioned that the two latter terms were often loosely treated as synonymous with those. Since the COVID-19 pandemic, awareness of RATs is no longer limited to health professionals and COVID-19 has become the expected referent, so more precise usage is required in other circumstances.

RATs are based on the principle of antigen-antibody interaction. They detect antigens (generally a protein on the surface of a virus). A linear chromatography substrate (a porous piece of material) bears an indicator line, onto which antibodies directed against the target antigen are fixed. Antibodies are also fixed to a visualisation marker (generally a dye, though sometimes these antibodies are modified to fluoresce), to which the sample is added. Any virus particles present will bind to these markers. This mix then travels through the substrate through capillarity. When it reaches the indicator line, virus particles are immobilised by the antibodies fixed there, along with the visualisation marker, allowing concentration and thus visual detection of significant levels of virus in a sample.

A positive result with an antigen test should generally be confirmed by RT-qPCR or some other test with higher sensitivity and specificity.

== Uses ==
Common examples of RATs or RADTs include:

- COVID-19 testing-related rapid tests
- Rapid strep tests (for streptococcal antigens)
- Rapid influenza diagnostic tests (RIDTs) (for influenza virus antigens)
- Malaria antigen detection tests (for Plasmodium antigens)

=== COVID-19 rapid antigen tests ===
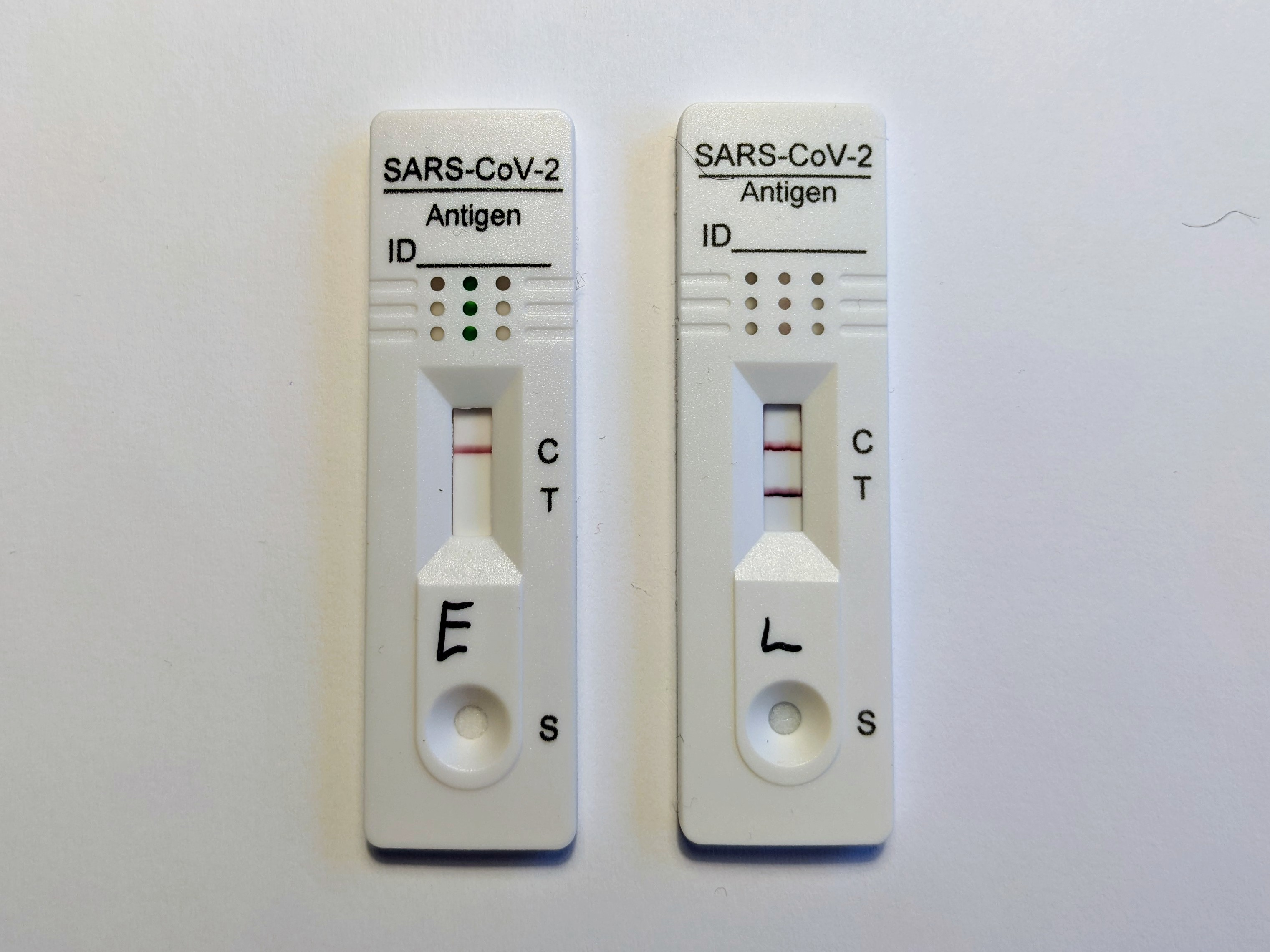
SARS-CoV-2 rapid tests showing a negative and a positive result

Rapid antigen tests for COVID-19 are one of the most useful applications of these tests. Often called lateral flow tests, they have provided global governments with several benefits. They are quick to implement with minimal training, offered significant cost advantages, costing a fraction of existing forms of PCR testing and give users a result within 5–30 minutes. Rapid antigen tests have found their best use as part of mass testing or population-wide screening approaches. They are successful in these approaches because in addition to the aforementioned benefits, they identify individuals who are the most infectious and could potentially spread the virus to a large number of other people. This differs slightly from other forms of COVID-19 tests such as PCR that are generally seen to be a useful test for individuals.

As early as February 2021, the US Department of State considered the antigen test suitable for entry to the country. In Canada, although the antigen test appeared to be no route to entry in January 2021, Health Canada in August 2021 made available subsidized at no cost rapid antigen tests "to more small and medium-sized organizations through new pharmacy partners".

== Scientific basis and underlying biology ==
RATs are immunochromatographic assays which give results that can be seen with the naked eye (with or without special illumination, such as a UV lamp). They are qualitative in nature, although within a certain range it is possible to make rough order of magnitude estimates of viral load from the results. RATs are generally screening tests, with relatively low sensitivity and specificity, thus results should be evaluated on the basis of confirmatory tests like PCR testing or western blot.

One inherent advantage of an antigen test over an antibody test (such as antibody-detecting rapid HIV tests) is that it can take time for the immune system to develop antibodies after infection begins, but the foreign antigen is present right away. Although any diagnostic test may have false negatives, this latency period can open an especially wide avenue for false negatives in antibody tests, although the particulars depend on which disease and which test are involved. A rapid antigen test typically costs around US$5 to manufacture.

For both typhoid and HIV, the antigen test is able to detect the infection earlier than the antibody test can. As the infection progresses, however, the antigen test becomes less sensitive than the antibody test. In HIV, this is because blood levels of immunoreactive p24 antigen diminish as the infection progresses. There are several rapid combination antigen/antibody tests for HIV.
