= Diagnosis of HIV/AIDS =

Immunological test

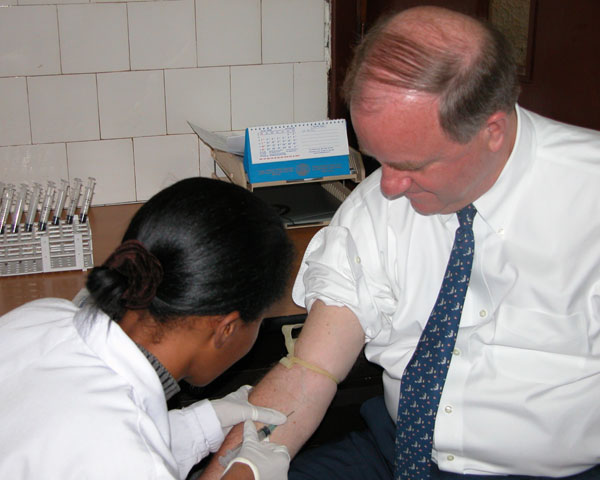
- Randall L. Tobias, former U.S. Global AIDS Coordinator, being publicly tested for HIV in Ethiopia in an effort to reduce the stigma of being tested

HIV tests are used to detect the presence of the human immunodeficiency virus (HIV), the virus that can lead to AIDS, in serum, saliva, or urine. Such tests may detect antibodies, antigens, or RNA.

== AIDS diagnosis ==
AIDS stands for acquired immunodeficiency syndrome. It is a clinical condition characterized by severe immunosuppression that can occur when HIV is untreated. A person with HIV is diagnosed with AIDS when their CD4+ T cell count falls below 200 cells per μL or they develop an AIDS-defining clinical condition.

== Terminology ==
The eclipse period is a variable period starting from HIV exposure in which no existing test can detect HIV. The median duration of the eclipse period in one study was 11.5 days. The window period is the time between HIV exposure and when an antibody or antigen test can detect HIV. The median window period for antibody/antigen testing is 18 days. Nucleic acid testing (NAT) further reduces this period to 11.5 days.

Performance of medical tests is often described in terms of:

- Sensitivity: The percentage of the results that will be positive when HIV is present
- Specificity: The percentage of the results that will be negative when HIV is not present.

All diagnostic tests have limitations, and sometimes their use may produce erroneous or questionable results.

- False positive: The test incorrectly indicates that HIV is present in a non-infected person.
- False negative: The test incorrectly indicates that HIV is absent in an infected person.

Nonspecific reactions, hypergammaglobulinemia, or the presence of antibodies directed to other infectious agents that may be antigenically similar to HIV can produce false positive results. Autoimmune diseases, such as systemic lupus erythematosus, have also rarely caused false positive results. Most false negative results are due to the window period.

== Principles ==
=== Screening donor blood and cellular products ===
Tests selected to screen donor blood and tissue must provide a high degree of confidence that HIV will be detected if present (that is, a high sensitivity is required). A combination of antibody, antigen and nucleic acid tests are used by blood banks in Western countries. The World Health Organization estimated that, as of 2000, inadequate blood screening had resulted in 1 million new HIV infections worldwide.

In the US, the Food and Drug Administration requires that all donated blood be screened for several infectious diseases, including HIV-1 and HIV-2, using a combination of antibody testing (EIA) and more expeditious nucleic acid testing (NAT). These diagnostic tests are combined with careful donor selection. As of 2001, the risk of transfusion-acquired HIV in the US was approximately one in 2.5 million for each transfusion.

=== Diagnosis of HIV infection ===
Tests used for the diagnosis of HIV infection in a particular person require a high degree of both sensitivity and specificity. In the United States, this is achieved using an algorithm combining two tests for HIV antibodies. If antibodies are detected by an initial test based on the ELISA method, then a second test using the western blot procedure determines the size of the antigens in the test kit binding to the antibodies. The combination of these two methods is highly accurate

=== Human rights ===
The UNAIDS/WHO policy statement on HIV Testing states that conditions under which people undergo HIV testing must be anchored in a human rights approach that pays due respect to ethical principles. According to these principles, the conduct of HIV testing of individuals must be

- Confidential;
- Accompanied by counseling (for those who test positive);
- Conducted with the informed consent of the person being tested.

=== Confidentiality ===
Considerable controversy exists over the ethical obligations of health care providers to inform the sexual partners of individuals infected with HIV that they are at risk of contracting the virus. Some legal jurisdictions permit such disclosure, while others do not. More state funded testing sites are now using confidential forms of testing. This allows for monitoring of infected individuals easily, compared to anonymous testing that has a number attached to the positive test results. Controversy exists over privacy issues.

In developing countries, home-based HIV testing and counseling (HBHTC) is an emerging approach for addressing confidentiality issues. HBHTC allows individuals, couples, and families to learn their HIV status in the convenience and privacy of their home environment. Rapid HIV tests are most often used, so results are available for the client between 15 and 30 minutes. Furthermore, when an HIV-positive result is communicated, the HTC provider can offer appropriate linkages for prevention, care, and treatment.

=== Anonymous testing ===
Anonymous testing may be available for people who wish to take an HIV test without giving their name. Instead of providing a name, the person undergoing the test receives a number and then presents that number to obtain the results of the test, which do not contain the person's name.

=== Routine testing recommendation ===
In the United States, one emerging standard of care is to screen all patients for HIV in all health care settings. In 2006, the Centers for Disease Control (CDC) announced an initiative for voluntary, routine testing of all Americans aged 13–64 during health care encounters. An estimated 25% of infected individuals were unaware of their status; if successful, this effort was expected to reduce new infections by 30% per year. The CDC recommends elimination of requirements for written consent or extensive pre-test counseling as barriers to widespread routine testing. In 2006, the National Association of Community Health Centers implemented a model for offering free, rapid HIV testing to all patients between the ages of 13 and 64 during routine primary medical and dental care visits. The program increased testing rates, with 66% of the 17,237 patients involved in the study agreeing to testing (56% were tested for the first time). In September 2010, New York became the first state to require that hospitals and primary care providers offer an HIV test to all patients between the ages of 13 and 64 years. An evaluation of the law's impact found that it increased testing significantly throughout the state.

== Antibody tests ==
HIV antibody tests are specifically designed for routine diagnostic testing of adults; these tests are inexpensive and extremely accurate.

=== Window period ===
Antibody tests may give false negative (no antibodies were detected despite the presence of HIV) results during the window period, hence an interval of three weeks to six months between the time of HIV exposure and the production of measurable antibodies to HIV seroconversion is implemented. Most people develop detectable antibodies approximately 18 to 30 days after exposure, although some do seroconvert later. The vast majority of people (99%) have detectable antibodies by two months after HIV exposure.

During the window period, an infected person can transmit HIV to others although their HIV infection may not be detectable with an antibody test. Antiretroviral therapy during the window period can delay the formation of antibodies and extend the window period beyond 12 months. This was not the case with patients that underwent treatment with post-exposure prophylaxis (PEP). Those patients must take ELISA tests at various intervals after the usual 28-day course of treatment, sometimes extending outside of the conservative window period of 6 months.

=== ELISA ===
The enzyme-linked immunosorbent assay (ELISA), or enzyme immunoassay (EIA), was the first screening test commonly employed for HIV. It has a high sensitivity.

In an ELISA test, a person's serum is diluted 400-fold and applied to a plate to which HIV antigens have been attached. If antibodies to HIV are present in the serum, they may bind to these HIV antigens. The plate is then washed to remove all other components of the serum. A specially prepared "secondary antibody" – an antibody that binds to human antibodies – is then applied to the plate, followed by another wash. This secondary antibody is chemically linked in advance to an enzyme. Thus the plate will contain enzyme in proportion to the amount of secondary antibody bound to the plate. A substrate for the enzyme is applied, and catalysis by the enzyme leads to a change in color or fluorescence. ELISA results are reported as a number; the most controversial aspect of this test is determining the "cut-off" point between a positive and negative result.

=== ELISA dongle ===
Researchers from Columbia University have produced an ELISA test dongle capable of testing for HIV and syphilis. It is compatible to any smartphone or computer without additional support or battery power, and takes some fifteen minutes to analyse a drop of blood. The units cost approximately $34 each to manufacture.

=== Western blot ===
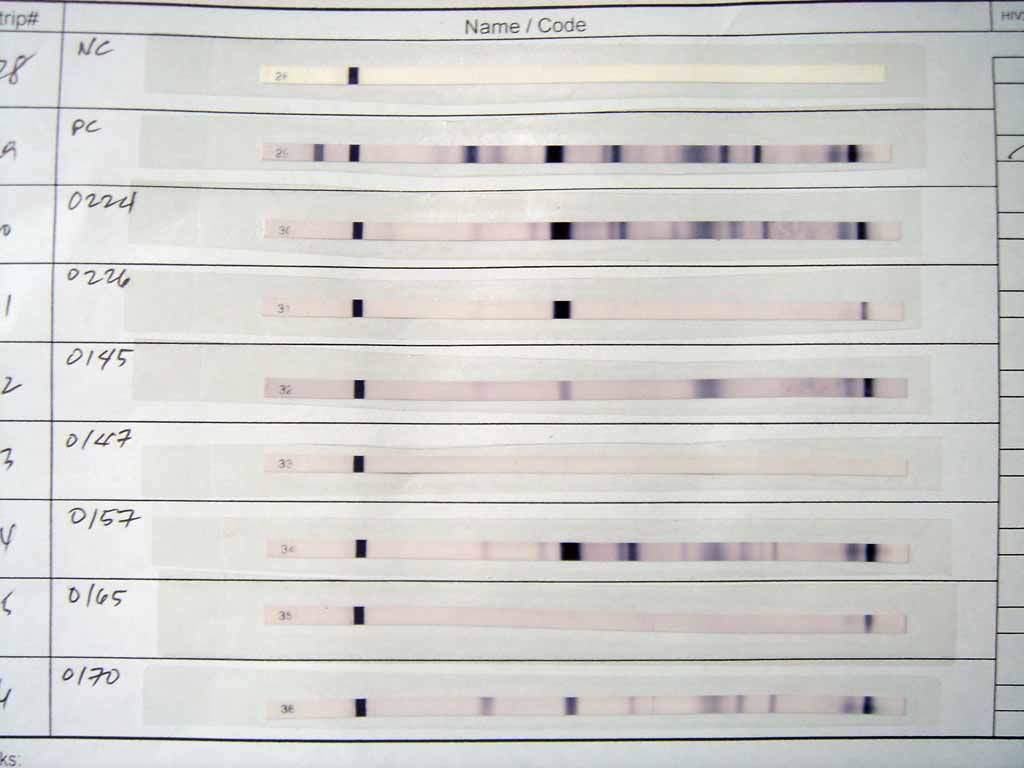
Western blot test results. The first two strips are a negative and a positive control, respectively. The others are actual tests.

Like the ELISA procedure, the western blot is an antibody detection test. However, unlike the ELISA method, the viral proteins are separated first and immobilized. In subsequent steps, the binding of serum antibodies to specific HIV proteins is visualized.

Specifically, cells that may be HIV-infected are opened and the proteins within are placed into a slab of gel, to which an electric current is applied. Different proteins will move with different speeds in this field, depending on their size, while their electrical charge is leveled by a surfactant called sodium lauryl sulfate. Some commercially prepared Western blot test kits contain the HIV proteins already on a cellulose acetate strip. Once the proteins are well-separated, they are transferred to a membrane and the procedure continues similar to an ELISA: the person's diluted serum is applied to the membrane and antibodies in the serum may attach to some of the HIV proteins. Antibodies that do not attach are washed away, and enzyme-linked antibodies with the capability to attach to the person's antibodies determine to which HIV proteins the person has antibodies.

There are no universal criteria for interpreting the western blot test: The number of viral bands that must be present may vary. If no viral bands are detected, the result is negative. If at least one viral band for each of the GAG, POL, and ENV gene-product groups are present, the result is positive. The three-gene-product approach to western blot interpretation has not been adopted for public health or clinical practice. Tests in which less than the required number of viral bands are detected are reported as indeterminate: a person who has an indeterminate result should be retested, as later tests may be more conclusive. Almost all HIV-infected persons with indeterminate western blot results will develop a positive result when tested in one month; persistently indeterminate results over a period of six months suggests the results are not due to HIV infection. In a generally healthy low-risk population, indeterminate results on western blot occur on the order of 1 in 5,000 patients. However, for those individuals who have had high-risk exposures to individuals where HIV-2 is most prevalent, Western Africa, an inconclusive western blot test may prove infection with HIV-2.

The HIV proteins used in western blotting can be produced by recombinant DNA in a technique called recombinant immunoblot assay (RIBA).

=== Rapid or point-of-care tests ===
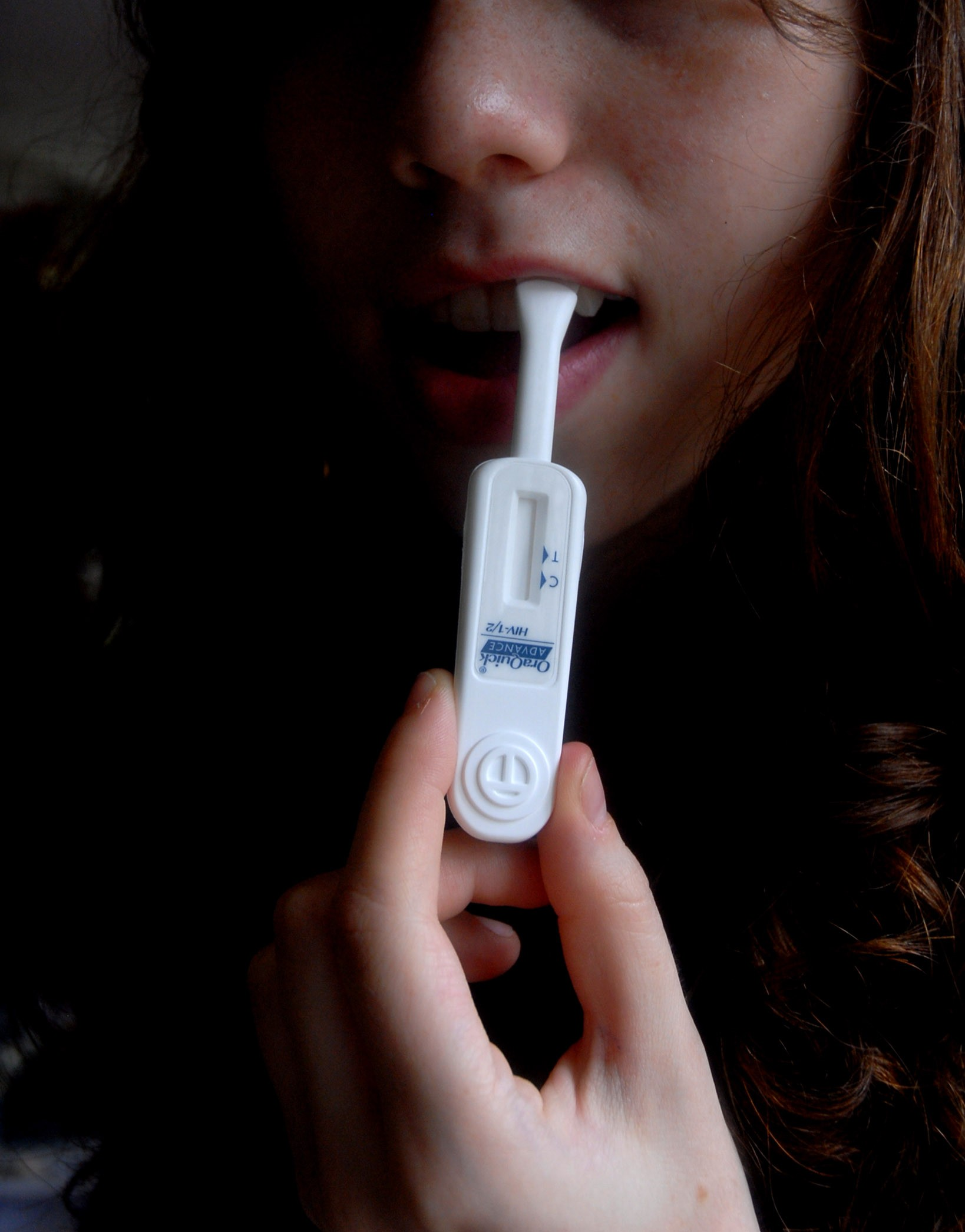
A woman demonstrates the use of the OraQuick rapid HIV test.

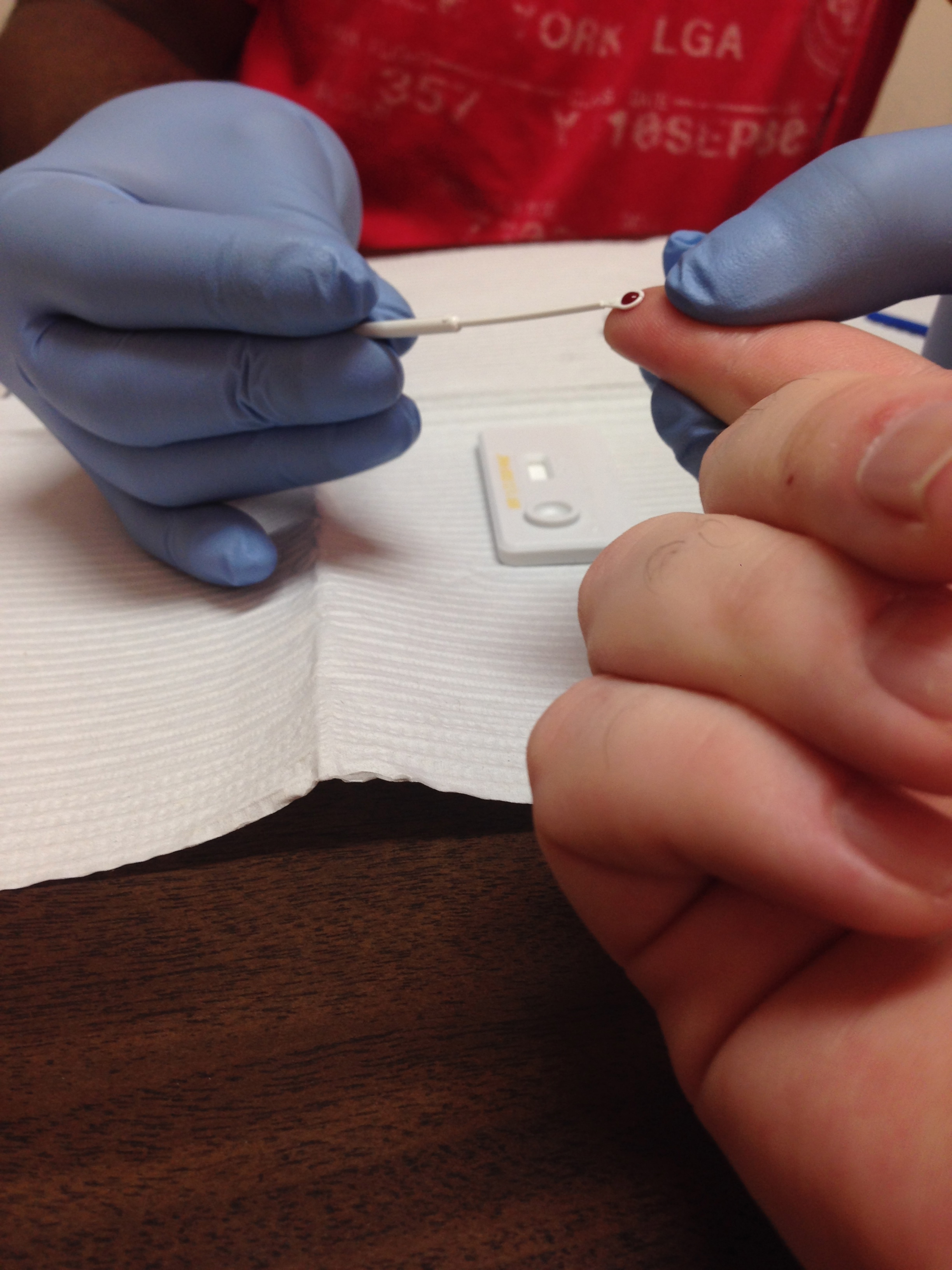
Blood being taken for HIV rapid test

Rapid antibody tests are qualitative immunoassays intended for use in point-of-care testing to aid in the diagnosis of HIV infection. These tests should be used in conjunction with the clinical status, history, and risk factors of the person being tested. The positive predictive value of Rapid Antibody Tests in low-risk populations has not been evaluated. These tests should be used in appropriate multi-test algorithms designed for statistical validation of rapid HIV test results.

If no antibodies to HIV are detected, this does not mean the person has not been infected with HIV. It may take several months after HIV infection for the antibody response to reach detectable levels, during which time rapid testing for antibodies to HIV will not be indicative of true infection status. For most people, HIV antibodies reach a detectable level after two to six weeks.

Although these tests have high specificity, false positives do occur. Any positive test result should be confirmed by a lab using the western blot.

Rapid combination antigen/antibody tests are also available.

=== Interpreting antibody tests ===
ELISA testing alone cannot be used to diagnose HIV, even if the test suggests a high probability that antibody to HIV-1 is present. In the United States, such ELISA results are not reported as "positive" unless confirmed by a western blot.

The ELISA antibody tests were developed to provide a high level of confidence that donated blood was not infected with HIV. It is therefore not possible to conclude that blood rejected for transfusion because of a positive ELISA antibody test is in fact infected with HIV. Sometimes, retesting the donor in several months will produce a negative ELISA antibody test. This is why a confirmatory western blot is always used before reporting a "positive" HIV test result.

Rare false positive results due to factors unrelated to HIV exposure are found more often with the ELISA test than with the western blot. False positives may be associated with medical conditions such as recent acute illnesses and allergies. A rash of false positive tests in the fall of 1991 was initially blamed on the influenza vaccines used during that flu season, but further investigation traced the cross-reactivity to several relatively non-specific test kits. A false positive result does not indicate a condition of significant risk to health. When the ELISA test is combined with Western Blot, the rate of false positives is extremely low, and diagnostic accuracy is very high (see below).

HIV antibody tests are highly sensitive, meaning they react preferentially with HIV antibodies, but not all positive or inconclusive HIV ELISA tests mean the person is infected by HIV. Risk history, and clinical judgement should be included in the assessment, and a confirmation test (western blot) should be administered. An individual with an inconclusive test should be re-tested at a later date.

=== Accuracy of HIV testing ===
Modern HIV testing is highly accurate. The evidence regarding the risks and benefits of HIV screening was reviewed in July 2005 by the U.S. Preventive Services Task Force. The authors concluded that:

...the use of repeatedly reactive enzyme immunoassay followed by confirmatory western blot or immunofluorescent assay remains the standard method for diagnosing HIV-1 infection. A large study of HIV testing in 752 U.S. laboratories reported a sensitivity of 99.7% and specificity of 98.5% for enzyme immunoassay, and studies in U.S. blood donors reported specificities of 99.8% and greater than 99.99%. With confirmatory Western blot, the chance of a false-positive identification in a low-prevalence setting is about 1 in 250 000 (95% CI, 1 in 173 000 to 1 in 379 000).

The specificity rate given here for the inexpensive enzyme immunoassay screening tests indicates that, in 1,000 HIV test results of healthy individuals, about 15 of these results will be a false positive. Confirming the test result (i.e., by repeating the test, if this option is available) could reduce the ultimate likelihood of a false positive to about 1 result in 250,000 tests given. The sensitivity rating, likewise, indicates that, in 1,000 test results of HIV infected people, 3 will actually be a false negative result. However, based upon the HIV prevalence rates at most testing centers within the United States, the negative predictive value of these tests is extremely high, meaning that a negative test result will be correct more than 9,997 times in 10,000 (99.97% of the time). The very high negative predictive value of these tests is why the CDC recommends that a negative test result be considered conclusive evidence that an individual does not have HIV.

Of course, the actual numbers vary depending on the testing population. This is because interpreting of the results of any medical test (assuming no test is 100% accurate) depends upon the initial degree of belief, or the prior probability that an individual has, or does not have a disease. Generally the prior probability is estimated using the prevalence of a disease within a population or at a given testing location. The positive predictive value and negative predictive value of all tests, including HIV tests, take into account the prior probability of having a disease along with the accuracy of the testing method to determine a new degree of belief that an individual has or does not have a disease (also known as the posterior probability). The chance that a positive test accurately indicates an HIV infection increases as the prevalence or rate of HIV infection increases in the population. Conversely, the negative predictive value will decrease as the HIV prevalence rises. Thus a positive test in a high-risk population, such as people who frequently engage in unprotected anal intercourse with unknown partners, is more likely to correctly represent HIV infection than a positive test in a very low-risk population, such as unpaid blood donors.

Many studies have confirmed the accuracy of current methods of HIV testing in the United States, reporting false-positive rates of 0.0004 to 0.0007 and false-negative rates of 0.003 in the general population.

== Antigen tests ==
The p24 antigen test detects the presence of the p24 protein of HIV (also known as CA), the capsid protein of the virus. Monoclonal antibodies specific to the p24 protein are mixed with the person's blood. Any p24 protein in the person's blood will stick to the monoclonal antibody and an enzyme-linked antibody to the monoclonal antibodies to p24 causes a color change if p24 was present in the sample.

In general diagnostics, p24 antigen tests are used for early detection of HIV, as p24 antigen rises sooner after infection relative to antibodies, and the test is often used in combination with an antibody test to effectively cover a longer portion of the window period.

In blood donation screening, this test is no longer used routinely in the US or the EU since the objective was to reduce the risk of false negatives in the window period. Nucleic acid testing (NAT) is more effective for this purpose, and p24 antigen testing is no longer indicated if a NAT test is performed.

In both cases, p24 is less useful as a standalone test, as it has low sensitivity and only works during the early time period after infection. The presence of p24 antigen diminishes as the body increases production of antibodies to the p24 protein, making p24 more difficult to detect later.

== Antigen/antibody combination tests ==
A combination, or 4th generation assay, is designed to detect both the p24 antigen and HIV antibodies in a single test. Combination tests can detect HIV as early as 2–6 weeks after infection, and are recommended in laboratory testing.

4th-generation rapid diagnostic tests are commercially available. They start being able to detect HIV at 2 weeks post-infection, but do not reach full sensitivity until 3 weeks post-infection.

== Nucleic acid-based tests (NAT) ==
Nucleic-acid-based tests amplify and detect one or more of several target sequences located in specific HIV genes, such as HIV-I GAG, HIV-II GAG, HIV-env, or the HIV-pol. Since these tests are relatively expensive, the blood is screened by first pooling some 8–24 samples and testing these together; if the pool tests positive, each sample is retested individually. Although this results in a dramatic decrease in cost, the dilution of the virus in the pooled samples decreases the effective sensitivity of the test, lengthening the window period by four days (assuming a 20-fold dilution, ~20hr virus doubling time, detection limit 50 copies/ml, making limit of detection 1,000 copies/ml). Since 2001, donated blood in the United States has been screened with nucleic-acid-based tests, shortening the window period between infection and detectability of disease to a median of 17 days (95% CI, 13–28 Days, assumes pooling of samples). A different version of this test is intended for use in conjunction with clinical presentation and other laboratory markers of disease progress for the management of HIV-1-infected patients.

In the RT-PCR test, viral RNA is extracted from the patient's plasma and is treated with reverse transcriptase (RT) to convert the viral RNA into cDNA. The polymerase chain reaction (PCR) process is then applied, using two primers unique to the virus's genome. After PCR amplification is complete, the resulting DNA products are hybridized to specific oligonucleotides bound to the vessel wall, and are then made visible with a probe bound to an enzyme. The amount of virus in the sample can be quantified with sufficient accuracy to detect threefold changes.

In the Quantiplex bDNA or branched DNA test, plasma is placed in a centrifuge to concentrate the virus, which is then opened to release its RNA. Special oligonucleotides that bind to viral RNA and to certain oligonucleotides bound to the wall of the vessel are added. In this way, viral RNA is fastened to the wall. Then new oligonucleotides that bind at several locations to this RNA are added, and other oligonucleotides that bind at several locations to those oligonucleotides. This is done to amplify the signal. Finally, oligonucleotides that bind to the last set of oligonucleotides and that are bound to an enzyme are added; the enzyme action causes a color reaction, which allows quantification of the viral RNA in the original sample. Monitoring the effects of antiretroviral therapy by serial measurements of plasma HIV-1 RNA with this test has been validated for patients with viral loads greater than 25,000 copies per milliliter.

== Screening ==
The South African government announced a plan to start screening for HIV in secondary schools by March 2011. This plan was cancelled due to concerns it would invade pupils' privacy, schools typically don't have the facilities to securely store such information, and schools generally do not have the capacity to provide counseling for HIV-positive pupils. In South Africa, anyone over the age of 12 may request an HIV test without parental knowledge or consent. Some 80,000 pupils in three provinces were tested under this programme before it ended.

== Other tests used in HIV treatment ==
The CD4 T-cell count is not an HIV test, but rather a procedure where the number of CD4 T-cells in the blood is determined.

A CD4 count does not check for the presence of HIV. It is used to monitor immune system function in HIV-positive people. Declining CD4 T-cell counts are considered to be a marker of progression of HIV infection. A normal CD4 count can range from 500 cells/mm3 to 1000 cells/mm3. In HIV-positive people, AIDS is officially diagnosed when the count drops below 200 cells/μL or when certain opportunistic infections occur. This use of a CD4 count as an AIDS criterion was introduced in 1992; the value of 200 was chosen because it corresponded with a greatly increased likelihood of opportunistic infection. Lower CD4 counts in people with AIDS are indicators that prophylaxis against certain types of opportunistic infections should be instituted.

Low CD4 T-cell counts are associated with a variety of conditions, including many viral infections, bacterial infections, parasitic infections, primary immunodeficiency, coccidioidomycosis, burns, trauma, intravenous injections of foreign proteins, malnutrition, over-exercising, pregnancy, normal daily variation, psychological stress, and social isolation.

This test is also used occasionally to estimate immune system function for people whose CD4 T cells are impaired for reasons other than HIV infection, which include several blood diseases, several genetic disorders, and the side effects of many chemotherapy drugs.

In general, the lower the number of T cells the lower the immune system's function will be. Normal CD4 counts are between 500 and 1500 CD4+ T cells/microliter, and the counts may fluctuate in healthy people, depending on recent infection status, nutrition, exercise, and other factors. Women tend to have somewhat lower counts than men.

== Criticisms ==
=== Oral tests ===
As a result of an increase in false positive rates with rapid oral HIV testing in 2005, New York City's Department of Health and Mental Hygiene added the option of testing finger-stick whole blood after any reactive result, before using a western blot test to confirm the positive result. Following a further increase of false positives in NYC DOHMH STD Clinics during the end of 2007 and beginning of 2008, their clinics opted to forgo further oral screenings, and instead reinstituted testing using finger-stick whole blood. Despite the increase in false positives in NYC DOHMH, the CDC still continues to support the use of noninvasive oral fluid specimens due to their popularity in health clinics and convenience of use. The director of the HIV control program for public health at Seattle King county, reported OraQuick failed to spot at least 8 percent of 133 people found to be infected with a comparable diagnostic test. Strategies implemented to determine quality control and false positive rates were implemented. It is to be understood that any reactive OraQuick test result is a preliminary positive result and will always require a confirmatory test, regardless of the mean of testing (venipuncture whole blood, fingerstick whole blood or oral mucosal transudate fluid). Several other testing sites who did not experience a spike in false positive rates continue to use OraSure's OraQuick HIV Anti-body Testing.

=== AIDS denialism ===
HIV tests have been criticized by AIDS denialists (a fringe group whose members believe that HIV either does not exist or is harmless). The accuracy of serologic testing has been verified by isolation and culture of HIV and by detection of HIV RNA by PCR, which are widely accepted "gold standards" in microbiology. While AIDS denialists focus on individual components of HIV testing, the combination of ELISA and western blot used for the diagnosis of HIV is remarkably accurate, with very low false-positive and -negative rates as described above. The views of AIDS denialists are based on highly selective analysis of mostly outdated scientific papers; there is broad scientific consensus that HIV is the cause of AIDS.

== Fraudulent testing ==
There have been a number of cases of fraudulent tests being sold via mail order or the Internet to the general public. In 1997, a California man was indicted on mail fraud and wire charges for selling supposed home test kits. In 2004, the US Federal Trade Commission asked Federal Express and US Customs to confiscate shipments of the Discreet home HIV test kits, produced by Gregory Stephen Wong of Vancouver, Canada. In February 2005, the US FDA issued a warning against using the rapid HIV test kits and other home use kits marketed by Globus Media of Montreal, Canada.
