= Window period =

Period when an infection is not yet detectable for a given test

In medicine, the window period for a test designed to detect a specific disease (particularly infectious disease) is the time between first infection and when the test can reliably detect that infection. In antibody-based testing, the window period is dependent on the time taken for seroconversion.

The window period is important to epidemiology and safe sex strategies, and in blood and organ donation, because during this time, an infected person or animal cannot be detected as infected but may still be able to infect others. For this reason, the most effective disease-prevention strategies combine testing with a waiting period longer than the test's window period.

== Examples ==
=== HIV ===
The window period for HIV may be up to three months, depending on the test method and other factors. RNA based HIV tests has the lowest window period. Modern and accurate testing abilities can cut this period to 25 days, 16 days, or even as low as 12 days, again, depending on the type of test and the quality of its administration and interpretation.

=== Hepatitis B ===
Two periods may be referred to as window period in hepatitis B infection:

(1) the period that elapses during HBsAg to HBsAb seroconversion, i.e. between the disappearance of surface antigen (HBsAg) from serum and the appearance of HBsAb (anti-HBs), and
(2) the period between infection and appearance of HBsAg.

During the window of HBsAg to HBsAb seroconversion, IgM anti-core (HBc-IgM) is the only detectable antibody. HBV DNA may be positive as well. This window period does not occur in persons who develop chronic hepatitis B, i.e. who continue to have detectable HBV DNA for greater than 6 months (HbsAg remains positive), or in people who develop isolated HBcAb positivity, i.e. who lose HBsAg, but do not develop HBsAb (HBV DNA may or may not remain positive).

== See also ==
- Incubation period, the time between infection and the appearance of symptoms
