= OraSure Technologies =

Medical device company

OraSure Technologies, Inc.
- Company type: Public
- Traded as: Nasdaq: OSUR
- Industry: Medical Devices
- Headquarters: Bethlehem, Pennsylvania, U.S.
- Area served: Worldwide
- Products: OraQuick

OraSure Technologies, Inc. is a Bethlehem, Pennsylvania–based company in the medical device industry. Their products include diagnostic testing kits. The company had recently developed OraQuick testing kit, the first over-the-counter home HIV test.

== History ==
OraSure was founded in 1988 by Sam Niedbala, Mike Gausling and two others as SolarCare Technologies Corp.

In 2000, the company merged with Epitope, a company that had developed a way of testing for HIV. After the merger, the company became OraSure.

In 2004, founder Sam Niedbala retired from the company.

In response to the COVID-19 pandemic, OraSure expanded the company by creating over 150 jobs in Bethlehem to work on creating a rapid, at-home coronavirus test. The company had previously developed products to rapidly check for Hepatitis C and Ebola.

In June 2025, healthcare entrepreneur Ron Zwanziger made an unsolicited all‑cash offer to acquire OraSure Technologies at a proposed price of between 3.50 and 4.00 dollars per share, according to people familiar with the matter. The board of OraSure rejected the approach without entering into negotiations. Zwanziger had previously attempted a stock‑for‑stock merger with the company in 2022, shortly after the appointment of chief executive Carrie Eglinton Manner, but the parties did not reach agreement on terms.

== Products ==
OraSure created the OraQuick test, which can detect the presence of HIV from a mouth swab within 20 minutes. In 2004, the company began marketing OraQuick to health care practitioners.

In a trial by OraSure, the test correctly detected HIV in those carrying the disease 93 percent of the time, a rate below the FDA-recommended 95 percent threshold for accuracy. The test was more accurate at clearing patients who didn't have the disease, correctly identifying HIV-negative users 99 percent of the time.

In July 2012, OraQuick was approved by the Food and Drug Administration for over-the-counter use.

There is also an OraQuick test for Ebola. The test is a rapid-antigen test that can be used on both live patients and cadavers.
