= Multiplexed point-of-care testing =

Bedside testing technology

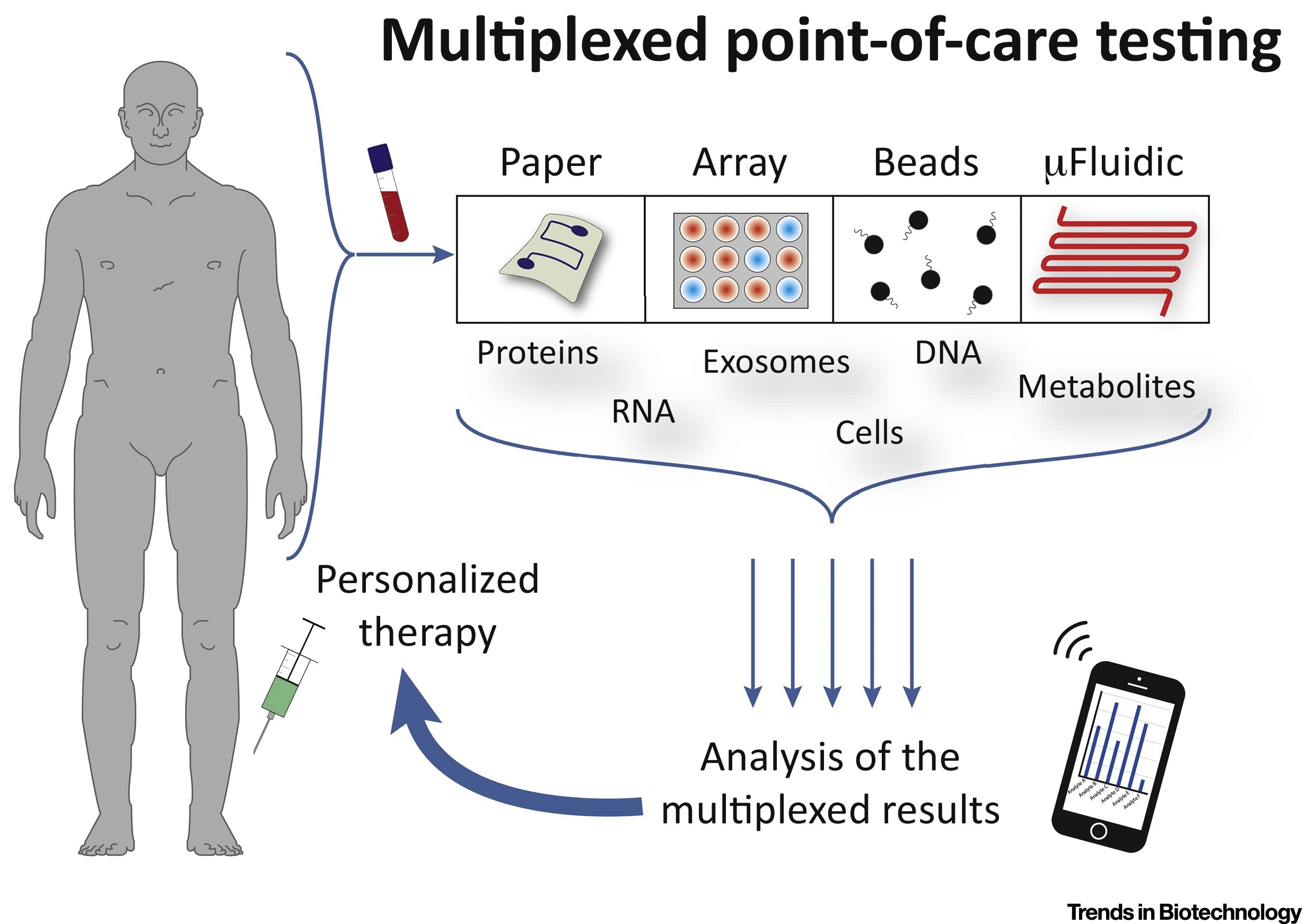
Schematic of the different types of xPOCT

Multiplexed point-of-care testing (xPOCT) is a more complex form of point-of-care testing (POCT), or bedside testing. Point-of-care testing is designed to provide diagnostic tests at or near the time and place that the patient is admitted. POCT uses the concentrations of analytes to provide the user with information on the physiological state of the patient. An analyte is a substance, chemical or biological, that is being analyzed using a certain instrument. While point-of-care testing is the quantification of one analyte from one in vitro (e.g., blood, plasma or urine) sample, multiplexed point-of-care testing is the simultaneous on-site quantification of various analytes from a single sample.

Processing of one biological sample to yield multiple biomarker results allows for POCT testing to be done for patients who may have conditions that require the confirmation of multiple biomarkers and tests before diagnosis (e.g., many types of cancers). xPOCT has important emerging applications in resource-limited settings (e.g., in the developing countries, in doctor's practices, or at home by non experts) and has recently become more important for in vitro diagnostics.

== Background ==
Historically, medical testing has been a tedious, long, and expensive process in a clinical setting. It usually involves taking a large sample from the patient (e.g., urine, blood, saliva, tissue swab) and processing it in a separate laboratory, which takes hours or sometimes days to complete. In that time frame, the patient needs to be provided with care, which is not favorable to do without the desired information from the laboratory test. As far back as the 1950s, radioimmunoassays were first demonstrated for the sensitive detection of insulin and thyroxine levels in human plasma. In the 1990s, research that was being conducted in the microelectronics industry was applied to the design of immunoassays, and since then the applications for immunoassays have expanded.

There has been a movement towards quicker, more simplistic and cost effective technologies that require small amounts of biological substances to yield results. This movement has been dubbed as microfluidic and lab-on-a-chip technology and aims to bring the results of a test accurately, quickly, and conveniently back to the patient with low cost and complexity to ensure the best patient care. Multiplexed point-of-care testing aims to do all of these things, but with multiple biomarkers at once. Microfluidics refers to the study and control of very small amounts of liquids, and lab-on-a-chip is an electronic chip that is usually about 3 square millimeters that has the ability to perform various laboratory like capillary electrophoresis and PCR.

== xPOCT technology characteristics ==
An ideal device for multiplexed point-of-care testing should offer high sensitivity and the capability to process one sample using multiple types of tests. It should be capable of testing various kinds of substances at the same time, including proteins, drugs, RNAs and cells. A high sensor performance that requires small samples, short turnaround times, low system complexity for non experts, and low cost are some characteristics of xPOCT technology. Especially for the resource-limited settings (developing countries, doctors offices, directly at home), equipment-free or smartphone-based devices are very advantageous.

xPOCT devices has to fulfill the following:

- Low sample consumption (e.g., blood from a finger prick) or the ability to measure in noninvasive samples (e.g., saliva, urine or exhaled breath condensate)
- Fast sample-to-result times enabling an immediate treatment
- Long shelf life with extended reagent storage
- Ease of storage
- Comparable test results with central laboratory findings ensuring international quality standards (ISO 15189)
- Automatic or facile system operation with minimized user intervention
- Cheap and portable readout systems (e.g., handheld readers) along with disposable test strips or cartridges fulfilling the in vitro diagnostics guideline (EU Directives or FDA regulations).

== Technologies ==
Multianalyte detection is mostly achieved through three different approaches, but the technology mainly aims to use a single or small set of biological samples to split or separate them to be read by various types of assays:

1. Regional separation employing distinct sections of a channel network or array of electrodes
2. Spatial separation of detection sites with the help of various wells or spots
3. Application of multiple labels such as enzymes, redox molecules, beads, and dyes

Other xPOCT devices use mass spectrometry (MS) to directly identify biomarkers. For example, matrix-assisted laser desorption/ionization (MALDI)-MS is used to rapidly identify pathogens, but devices that use this technology tend to be bulky and difficult to use. For the signal readout, optical and electrochemical detection methods are mainly employed.

Current types of diagnostic devices being used:

- Paper-based systems - Lateral flow assays like pregnancy tests, which use samples that react with colored particles and require the device to read the color signature
- Array-based systems - Devices with electrodes or fluorescent molecules in them that are sensitive to certain analytes
- Bead-based systems - Systems that use beads as a material for the analytes to bind specifically to, and those complexes are subsequently filtered or separated by size or color, as in bead based flow cytometry

== Benefits and challenges ==
xPOCT has incredible benefits and applications for the healthcare and technology. It allows for a more cost effective, more rapid, portable, less painful, less complex yet accurate technology that can be used to test for indicators of conditions that previously required multiple samples and several hours or days to do. In addition to its implications in the clinical setting, the low complexity and portability of many multiplexed point-of-care test devices allows for its use by non experts at home both for those who require at home health monitoring systems and for other personalized medicinal uses. The incidence of false positives or false negatives seem to be low.

Reaching the optimal space of high performance and low complexity, cost, and size has some challenges. Scientists, hospitals, manufacturers, and policy makers must ensure that the data gathered from these devices would be secure, and that the devices and the materials used in conjunction with it remain affordable and safe. In addition to these things, the devices themselves should be functional for long periods of time and should find ways to deal with their sensitivity to patient to patient variations, and the environment (humidity, temperature etc.).

== Future research ==
Current research that is being done regarding xPOCT is focusing on making the requirements for something to be considered a xPOCT easier and cheaper to obtain. Scientists are working to make multiplexed point-of-care devices smaller, more portable, and affordable. Research is also being done on the maximum number of analytes that can be tested at once, if smartphones are a good device to use to present the results of a test, and could there be a device that allows a patient to wear a xPOC device that continuously monitors biomarkers of interest.
