= Malaria antigen detection tests =

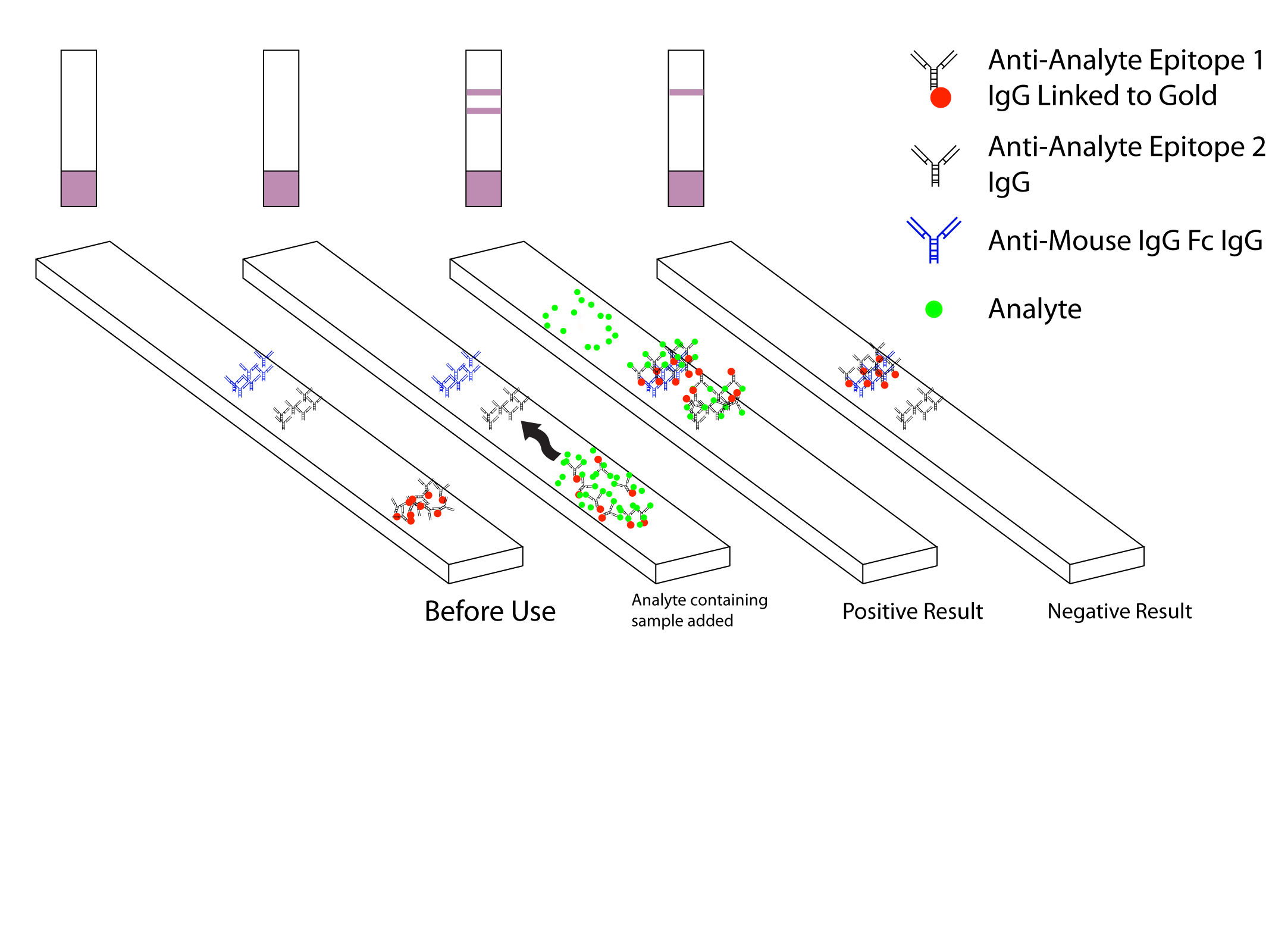
- A schematic diagram of a dipstick
- Purpose: diagnosis of malaria

Malaria antigen detection tests are a group of commercially available rapid diagnostic tests of the rapid antigen test type that allow quick diagnosis of malaria by people who are not otherwise skilled in traditional laboratory techniques for diagnosing malaria or in situations where such equipment is not available. There are currently over 20 such tests commercially available (WHO product testing 2008). The first malaria antigen suitable as target for such a test was a soluble glycolytic enzyme Glutamate dehydrogenase. None of the rapid tests are currently as sensitive as a thick blood film, nor as cheap. A major drawback in the use of all current dipstick methods is that the result is essentially qualitative. In many endemic areas of tropical Africa, however, the quantitative assessment of parasitaemia is important, as a large percentage of the population will test positive in any qualitative assay.

== Antigen-based rapid diagnostic tests ==
Malaria is a curable disease if the person have access to early diagnosis and prompt treatment. Antigen-based rapid diagnostic tests (RDTs) have an important role at the periphery of health services capability because many rural clinics do not have the ability to diagnose malaria on-site due to a lack of microscopes and trained technicians to evaluate blood films. Furthermore, in regions where the disease is not endemic, laboratory technologists have very limited experience in detecting and identifying malaria parasites. An ever increasing numbers of travelers from temperate areas each year visit tropical countries and many of them return with a malaria infection. The RDT tests are still regarded as complements to conventional microscopy but with some improvements it may well replace the microscope. The tests are simple and the procedure can be performed on the spot in field conditions. These tests use finger-stick or venous blood, the completed test takes a total of 15–20 minutes, and a laboratory is not needed. The threshold of detection by these rapid diagnostic tests is in the range of 100 parasites/μL of blood compared to 5 by thick film microscopy.

=== pGluDH ===
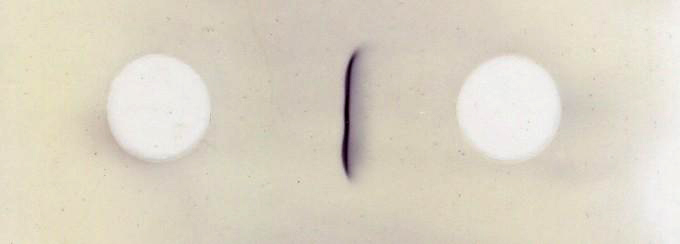
Plasmodium Glutamate dehydrogenase (pGluDH) precipitated by host antibodies

An accurate diagnosis is becoming more and more important, in view of the increasing resistance of Plasmodium falciparum and the high price of alternatives to chloroquine. The enzyme pGluDH does not occur in the host red blood cell and was recommended as a marker enzyme for Plasmodium species by Picard-Maureau et al. in 1975. The malaria marker enzyme test is suitable for routine work and is now a standard test in most departments dealing with malaria. Presence of pGluDH is known to represent parasite viability and a rapid diagnostic test using pGluDH as antigen would have the ability to differentiate live from dead organisms. A complete RDT with pGluDH as antigen has been developed in China and is now undergoing clinical trials. GluDHs are ubiquitous enzymes that occupy an important branch-point between carbon and nitrogen metabolism. Both nicotinamide adenine dinucleotide (NAD) [EC 1.4.1.2] and nicotinamide adenine dinucleotide phosphate (NADP) dependent GluDH [EC 1.4.1.4] enzymes are present in Plasmodia; the NAD-dependent GluDH is relatively unstable and not useful for diagnostic purposes. Glutamate dehydrogenase provides an oxidizable carbon source used for the production of energy as well as a reduced electron carrier, NADH. Glutamate is a principal amino donor to other amino acids in subsequent transamination reactions. The multiple roles of glutamate in nitrogen balance make it a gateway between free ammonia and the amino groups of most amino acids. Its crystal structure is published. The GluDH activity in P.vivax, P.ovale and P. malariae has never been tested, but given the importance of GluDH as a branch point enzyme, every cell must have a high concentration of GluDH. It is well known that enzymes with a high molecular weight (like GluDH) have many isozymes, which allows strain differentiations (given the right monoclonal antibody). The host produces antibodies against the parasitic enzyme indicating a low sequence identity.

=== Histidine rich protein II ===
The histidine-rich protein II (HRP II) is a histidine- and alanine-rich, water-soluble protein, which is localized in several cell compartments including the parasite cytoplasm. The antigen is expressed only by P. falciparum trophozoites. HRP II from P. falciparum has been implicated in the biocrystallization of hemozoin, an inert, crystalline form of ferriprotoporphyrin IX (Fe(3+)-PPIX) produced by the parasite. A substantial amount of the HRP II is secreted by the parasite into the host bloodstream and the antigen can be detected in erythrocytes, serum, plasma, cerebrospinal fluid and even urine as a secreted water-soluble protein. These antigens persist in the circulating blood after the parasitaemia has cleared or has been greatly reduced. It generally takes around two weeks after successful treatment for HRP2-based tests to turn negative, but may take as long as one month, which compromises their value in the detection of active infection. False positive dipstick results were reported in patients with rheumatoid-factor-positive rheumatoid arthritis. Since HRP-2 is expressed only by P. falciparum, these tests will give negative results with samples containing only P. vivax, P. ovale, or P. malariae; many cases of non-falciparum malaria may therefore be misdiagnosed as malaria negative (some P.falciparum strains also don't have HRP II). The variability in the results of pHRP2-based RDTs is related to the variability in the target antigen.

=== pLDH ===
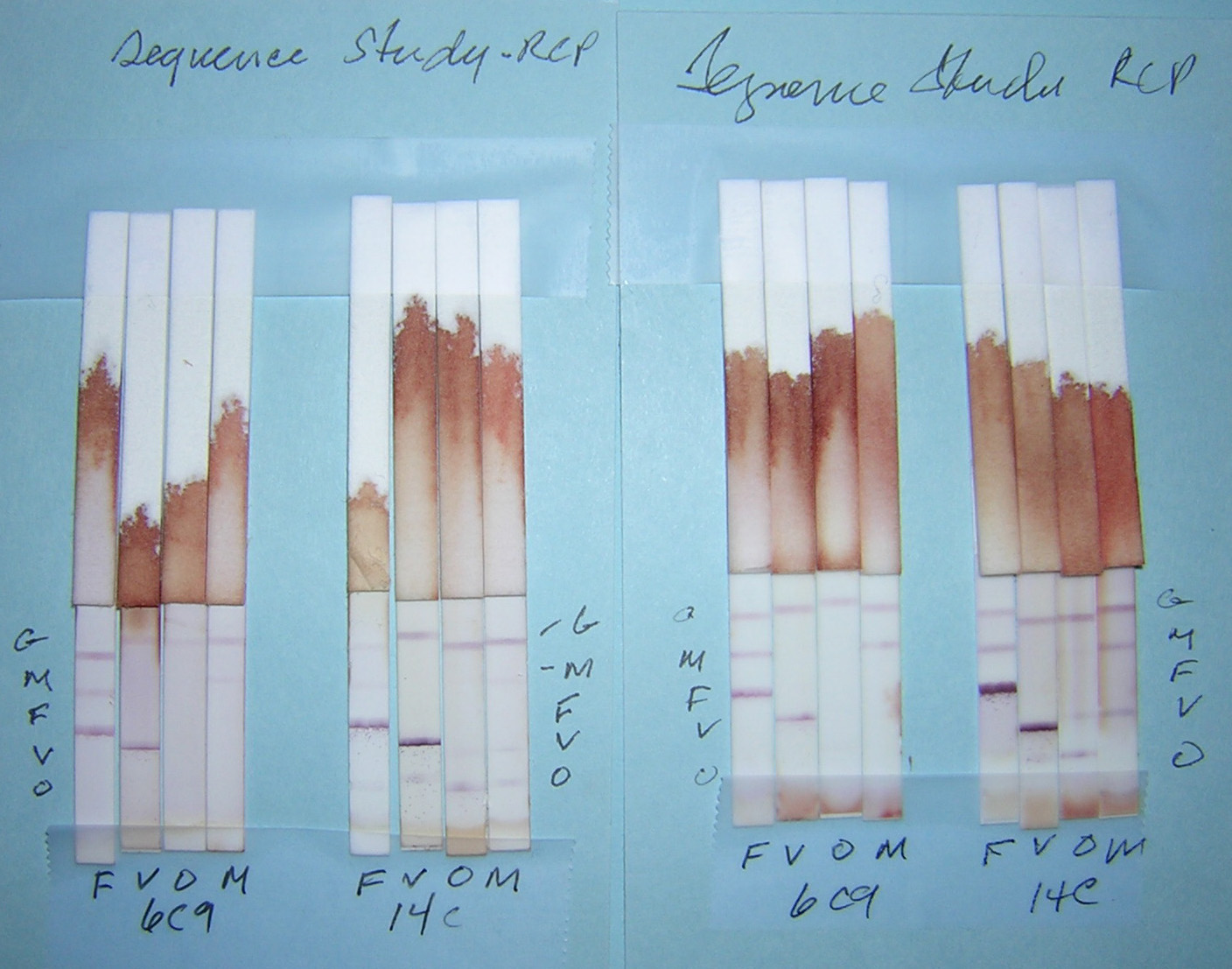
Comparison of Plasmodium Lactate Dehydrogenase (PLDH) Malaria Antibodies

P. falciparum lactate dehydrogenase (PfLDH) is a 33 kDa oxidoreductase [EC 1.1.1.27]. It is the last enzyme of the glycolytic pathway, essential for ATP generation and one of the most abundant enzymes expressed by P. falciparum. Plasmodium LDH (pLDH) from P. vivax, P. malariae, and P. ovale) exhibit 90-92% identity to PfLDH from P. falciparum. pLDH levels have been seen to reduce in the blood sooner after treatment than HRP2. In this respect, pLDH is similar to pGluDH. Nevertheless, the kinetic properties and sensitivities to inhibitors targeted to the cofactor binding site differ significantly and are identifiable by measuring dissociation constants for inhibitors which, differ by up to 21-fold.

=== pAldo ===
Fructose-bisphosphate aldolase [EC 4.1.2.13] catalyzes a key reaction in glycolysis and energy production and is produced by all four species. The P.falciparum aldolase is a 41 kDa protein and has 61-68% sequence similarity to known eukaryotic aldolases. Its crystal structure has been published. The presence of antibodies against p41 in the sera of human adults partially immune to malaria suggest that p41 is implicated in protective immune response against the parasite.

== See also ==
- Romanowsky stain
