= Point-of-care testing =

Diagnostic testing performed at or near the point of care

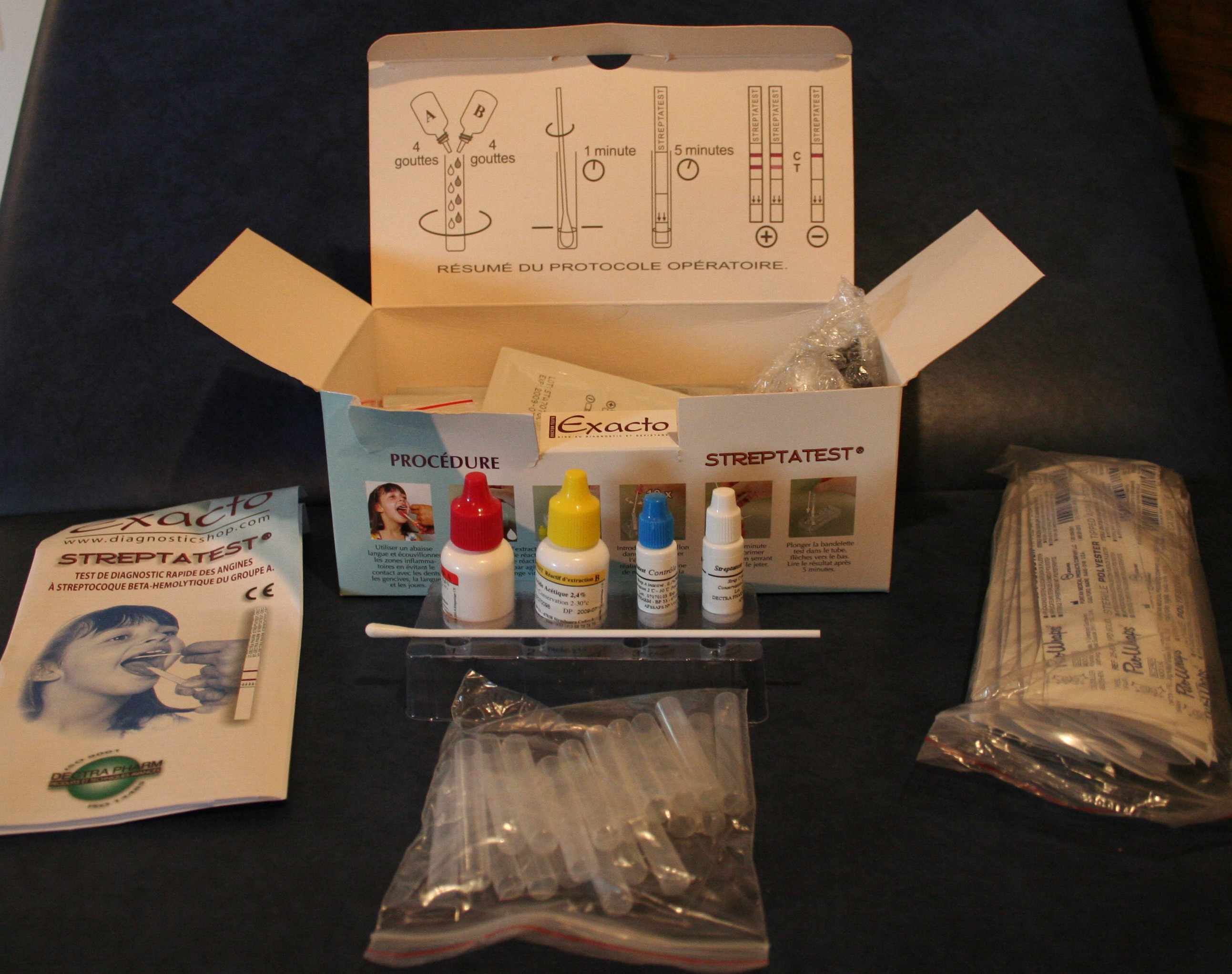
- Rapid diagnostic tests are an example of POCT
- MeSH: D000067716

Point-of-care testing (POCT), also called near-patient testing or bedside testing, is defined as medical diagnostic testing at or near the point of care—that is, at the time and place of patient care. This contrasts with the historical pattern in which testing was wholly or mostly confined to the medical laboratory, which entailed sending off specimens away from the point of care and then waiting hours or days to learn the results, during which time care must continue without the desired information.

== Technology overview ==
Point-of-care tests are simple medical tests that can be performed at the bedside. In many cases, the simplicity was not achievable until technology developed not only to make a test possible at all but then also to mask its complexity. For example, various kinds of urine test strips have been available for decades, but portable ultrasonography did not reach the stage of being advanced, affordable, and widespread until the 2000s and 2010s. Today, portable ultrasonography is often viewed as a "simple" test, but there was nothing simple about it until the more complex technology was available. Similarly, pulse oximetry can test arterial oxygen saturation in a quick, simple, noninvasive, affordable way today, but in earlier eras this required an intra-arterial needle puncture and a laboratory test; and rapid diagnostic tests such as malaria antigen detection tests or COVID-19 rapid tests that rely on a state of the art in immunology that did not exist until recent decades. Thus, over decades, testing continues to move toward the point of care more than it formerly had been. A recent survey in five countries (Australia, Belgium, the Netherlands, the UK and the US) indicates that general practitioners / family doctors would like to use more POCTs.

The driving notion behind POCT is to bring the test conveniently and immediately to the patient. This increases the likelihood that the patient, physician, and care team will receive the results quicker, which allows for better immediate clinical management decisions to be made. In addition, this technology enables remote communities as First Nations people, to have access to laboratory testing, thereby allowing for more assertive health care. POCT includes: blood glucose testing, blood gas and electrolytes analysis, rapid coagulation testing, rapid cardiac markers diagnostics, drugs of abuse screening, urine strips testing, pregnancy testing, fecal occult blood analysis, food pathogens screening, hemoglobin diagnostics, infectious disease testing (such as COVID-19 rapid tests), cholesterol screening and emerging technologies in micronutrient deficiency screening and diagnosis of acute febrile illness.

Lab-on-a-chip technologies are one of the main drivers of point-of-care testing, especially in the field of infectious disease diagnosis. These technologies enable different bioassays such as microbiological culture, PCR, ELISA to be used at the point of care.

POCT is often accomplished through the use of transportable, portable, and handheld instruments (e.g., blood glucose meter, nerve conduction study device) and test kits (e.g., CRP, HBA1C, Homocystein, HIV salivary assay, etc.). Small bench analyzers or fixed equipment can also be used when a handheld device is not available—the goal is to collect the specimen and obtain the results in a very short period of time at or near the location of the patient so that the treatment plan can be adjusted as necessary before the patient leaves. Cheaper, faster, and smarter POCT devices have increased the use of POCT approaches by making it cost-effective for many diseases, such as diabetes, carpal tunnel syndrome (CTS) and acute coronary syndrome. Additionally, it is very desirable to measure various analytes simultaneously in the same specimen, allowing a rapid, low-cost, and reliable quantification. Therefore, multiplexed point-of-care testing (xPOCT) has become more important for medical diagnostics in the last decade.

Many point-of-care test systems are realized as easy-to-use membrane-based test strips, often enclosed by a plastic test cassette. This concept often is realized in test systems for detecting pathogens, the most common being COVID-19 rapid tests. Very recently such test systems for rheumatology diagnostics have been developed, too. These tests require only a single drop of whole blood, urine or saliva, and they can be performed and interpreted by any general physician within minutes. Recently, a portable medical diagnostic device called "BioPoC" has been reported which employs free-standing enzyme-modified responsive polymer membrane-based biosensors and a newly devised low-cost transduction principle for the detection of H. pylori and urea.

During the COVID-19 pandemic, rapid development of POCT occurred, aiming to improve the turnaround time and ease of use compared to the gold standard lab-based PCR test. These have included rapid antigen tests, alternate nucleic acid amplification methods, and novel sensors. A range of test have been developed including smartphone based platforms, and tests targeting blood, saliva, faecal matter, urine, and tears have been proposed. Saliva in particular may offer sufficiently high detection rates in tandem with a non-invasive and user friendly procedure, although reliability requires improvement.

Emerging technology at the point of care setting is being developed to allow for rapid assessment of micronutrient deficiency. The Cornell NutriPhone is a technology for determining nutritional status at the point of care. This technology allows assessment of iron, vitamin A, vitamin D, and vitamin B12 from a single drop of blood in around 15 minutes. Building on this same platform, there are proof-of-concept studies for fever and cancer.

== Benefits ==
The coupling of POCT devices and electronic medical records enable test results to be shared instantly with care providers. The use of mobile devices in the health care setting also enable the health care provider to quickly access patient test results sent from a POCT device. A reduction in morbidity and mortality has been associated with such rapid turn around times from a study using the i-STAT to analyze blood lactate levels after congenital heart surgery.

POCT has become established worldwide and finds vital roles in public health. Many researchers emphasize POCT as the normal standard of care in disaster situations.

Potential operational benefits include more rapid decision making and triage, reduced operating times, high-dependency, postoperative care time, emergency room time, number of outpatient clinic visits, number of hospital beds required, ensuring optimal use of professional time and reduced of antimicrobial medication.

At home or POCT tests, providing results within minutes of being administered, would allow for appropriate measures and rapid decisions about dental patients' care process. Characteristics and detection rate of SARS-CoV-2 in alternative sites and specimens related to dentistry has been extensively reviewed.

== Regulatory in the U.S. ==
The Clinical Laboratory Improvement Amendments (CLIA) regulate any laboratory testing and require laboratories to obtain certificates to do any testing on human specimens for health assessment or to diagnose, prevent, or treat disease. Three federal agencies partner together to cover the responsibilities put forward in the regulations: the Food and Drug Administration (FDA), Centers for Medicare & Medicaid Services (CMS), and the Centers for Disease Control and Prevention (CDC). In addition, accreditation standards developed by Joint Commission and College of American Pathologists have been developed to improve quality.

=== Food and Drug Administration (FDA) ===
In vitro diagnostic (IVD) products use the same categorization as medical devices (Class I, II, and III) to assure safety and effectiveness. Regulatory controls and premarket approval process are determined by this classification, with Class I being the lowest risk (least regulated) and Class III being the highest risk (most regulated).

Under the CLIA, it is the role of the FDA to assess the complexity of the in vitro laboratory diagnostic tests. Tests are only scored after the FDA has cleared or approved a premarketing request, or upon request. Manufacturers can apply for CLIA waivers during this premarket approval/clearance process. Tests that are already cleared or approved for home use or are waived by 42 CRF 293.15(c), are classified as waived. Otherwise, the tests are either classified as moderate or high complexity based on seven categorization criteria listed in 42 CFR 493.17. If the test is classified as moderate, the manufacturer may request the test be waived through the CLIA Waiver by Application. The application must show that the test meets the criteria in 42 U.S.C. § 263a(d)(3), that the test is simple and will not cause harm to the patient if performed incorrectly.

These test classifications determine the certifications needed for laboratories to perform said tests. Waived tests require the least regulation, while moderate to high complexity tests require higher regulation and standards within the laboratory.

=== Center for Medicaid Services (CMS) ===
Under CLIA, it is the role of CMS to issue laboratory certificates and monitor, inspect, and enforce laboratory regulatory compliance based on the tests being performed. In total, CMS covers 260,000 laboratories.

=== Centers for Disease Control and Prevention (CDC) ===
The CDC focuses on the analysis, research, and technical assistance within the CLIA partnership. In particular, the CDC establishes technical standards and guidelines, conducting studies, monitoring practices, and developing resources. In addition, the CDC manages the Clinical Laboratory Improvement Advisory Committee (CLIAC). CLIAC is made up of experts in many specialties throughout clinical and anatomic pathology that provide guidance and advice on general issues within laboratory science.

The CDC specifically acknowledges that point-of-care testing simply describes the location at which the testing is performed and not the complexity of the test itself. With technological innovation, more complex tests will be able to be performed at the bedside that may not be CLIA-waived like some other at-home point of care tests that the FDA has waived such as urine dipsticks.

== Funding ==
In the United Kingdom the GP contract leaves the cost of point-of-care testing, which may be substantial, with the individual GP practice, which the cost of medication is met by the clinical commissioning group, which, as the House of Commons Health and Social Care Committee noted in October 2018, creates perverse incentives.

== See also ==
- COVID-19 rapid test
- Rapid diagnostic test
- Multiplexed point-of-care testing
