= Rapid influenza diagnostic test =

Test for influenza infection

A rapid influenza diagnostic test (RIDT) tells whether a person has a current influenza infection by detecting the influenza viral nucleoprotein antigen. Commercially available RIDTs can provide results within 30 minutes. These results can be observed by a color change or other visual signals. For clinicians, RIDTs serve as a first-line test that can be confirmed (especially if negative) by traditional diagnostic tests. RIDTs also allow clinicians to promptly start antiviral treatment in high-risk populations, to formulate effective infection control measures, and to make informed decisions regarding diagnostic investigations. RIDTs have been shown to reduce chest radiography and blood tests in ambulatory care settings, but not antibiotic prescribing, or time in the emergency department.

According to a study, an H1N1 rapid test had a sensitivity of 66%, corresponding to a false-negative probability of 34% in detecting H1N1.

== Sample collection ==
RIDT accuracy may be dependent on collection technique used to obtain the sample. Samples used for RIDT include respiratory specimens such as throat, nose, and nasopharyngeal secretions, as well as aspirate or washings collected from the trachea.

== See also ==
- Viral culture
