= Aschoff cell =

Cells associated with rheumatic heart disease

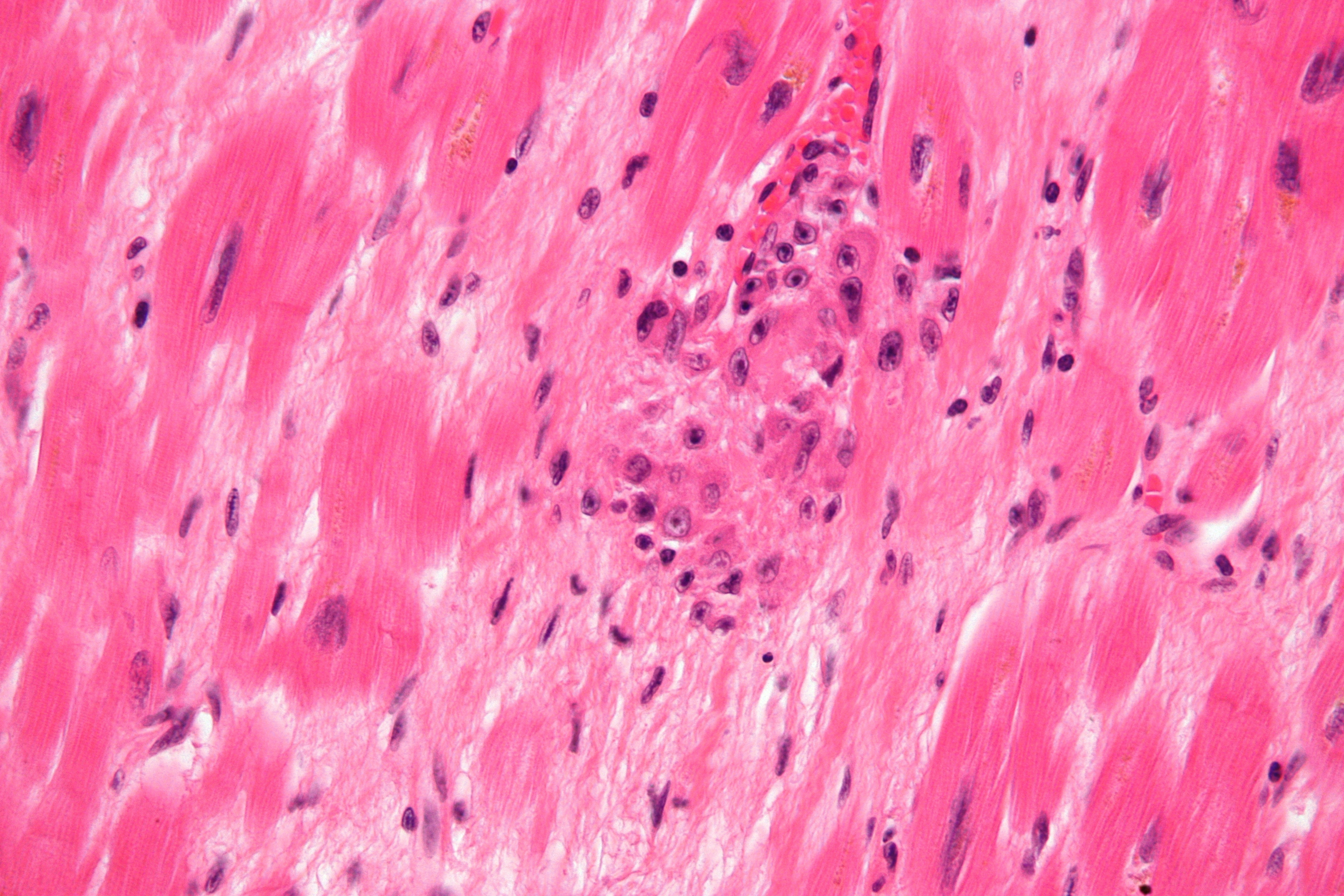
H&E stain with visible Aschoff cells in rheumatic heart disease.

In pathology, Aschoff cells (or Aschoff giant cells) are cells associated with rheumatic heart disease. They are found in Aschoff bodies surrounding centres of fibrinoid necrosis.
In comparison with Anitschkow cells their cytoplasm is more basophilic and can contain up to four nuclei.
Aschoff believed that Aschoff giant cells were some type of connective or endothelial tissue. Today Aschoff cells are considered to be derived from cardiac myocytes rather than connective tissue cells.

Aschoff cells were named after the German physician and pathologist Ludwig Aschoff.
