= ASLO =

ASLO or Aslo may refer to:

- Association for the Sciences of Limnology and Oceanography
- Anti-streptolysin O
- Australian Scientific Liaison Office
- Aslo, a character in the film Epic Movie
