= Erythema marginatum =

Red, circular lesions of the skin on the limbs or trunk

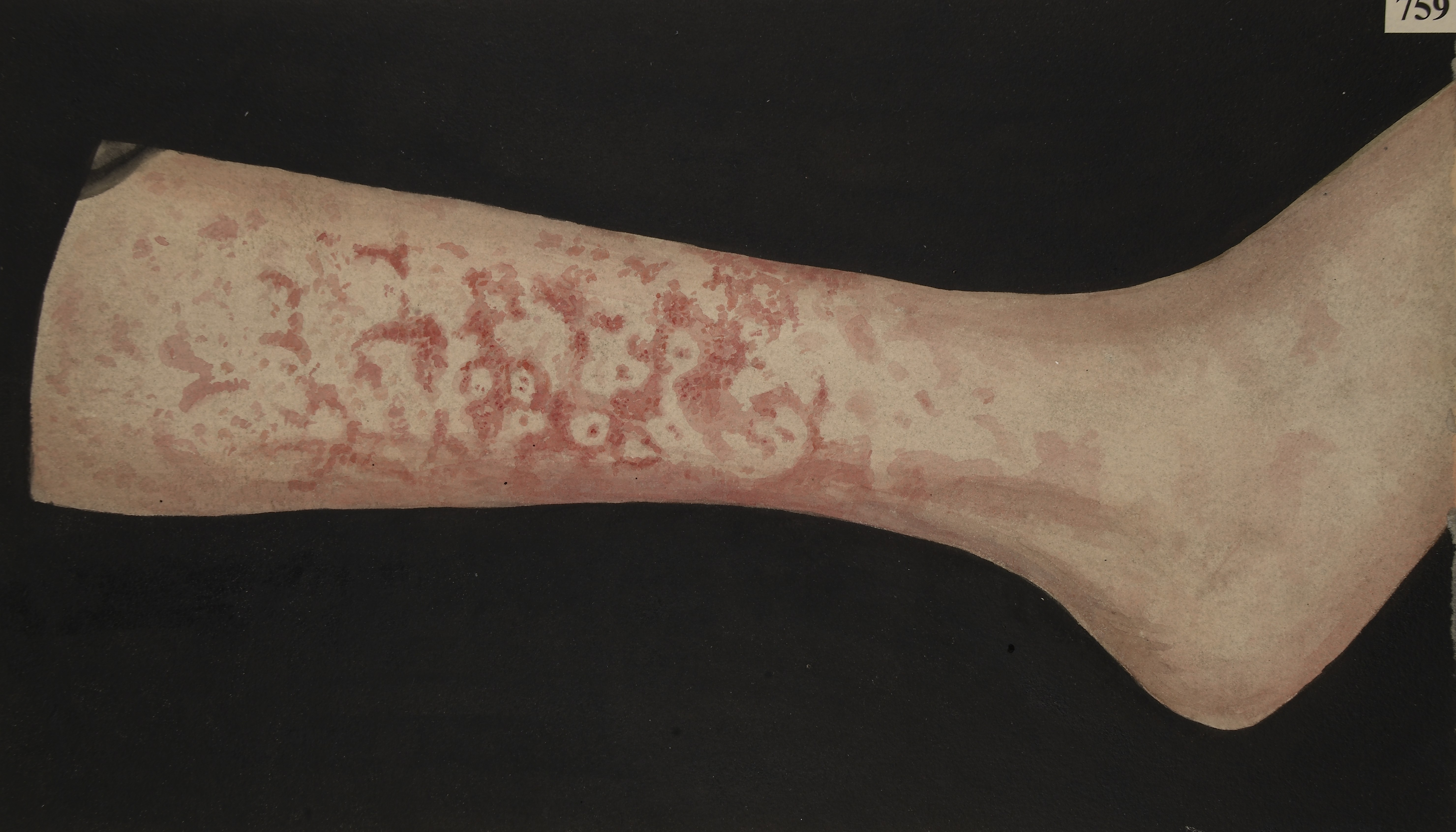
- Painting of a leg with erythema marginatum
- Specialty: Dermatology

Erythema marginatum (also known as chicken wire erythema) is an acquired skin condition which primarily affects the arms, trunk, and legs. It is a type of erythema (redness of the skin or mucous membranes) characterised by bright pink or red circular lesions which have sharply defined borders and faint central clearing. The lesions typically range from 3 to 10 cm in size, and are distributed symmetrically over the torso and inner surfaces of the limbs and extensor surfaces. The lesions usually last for a few hours to a few days and may reappear over the subsequent weeks.

The condition was first reported in 1816 by Jean Cruveilhier and is thought to be linked to other skin conditions such as urticaria and systemic lupus erythematosus.

An association with bradykinin has been proposed in the case of hereditary angioedema.

== Presentation ==
Since the margin of the lesions usually forms rings, the condition is also called "erythema annulare." The rings are barely raised and are non-itchy. The face is generally spared.

The condition is characterised by circular, non-pruritic, erythematous rashes that form on the trunk and extremities of the body. The rash has a known serpiginous edge, and often appears and disappears spontaneously over time. Histological examination of the rash identifies infiltration of mononuclear cells and neutrophils in the papillary and upper half of the reticular dermis layer.

=== Associated conditions ===
It occurs in less than 10% of patients with acute rheumatic fever (ARF), but is considered a major Jones criterion when it does occur. The four other major criteria include carditis, polyarthritis, Sydenham's chorea, and subcutaneous nodules. In this case, it is often associated with Group A streptococcal infection, otherwise known as Streptococcus pyogenes infection, which can be detected with an ASO titer.

It is an early feature of acute rheumatic fever, though not pathognomonic of it. It some cases it may be associated with mild myocarditis (inflammation of heart muscle).

The condition is also seen as a precursor to or accompanying an attack of angioedema, and is seen in conditions like allergic drug reactions, sepsis, and glomerulonephritis.

It often occurs as a harbinger of attacks in hereditary angioedema. In this case, it may occur several hours or up to a day before an attack.

== Diagnosis ==
=== Types ===
Some sources distinguish between the following:

- "Erythema marginatum rheumaticum"
- "Erythema marginatum perstans"

The diagnosis of erythema marginatum can be made during examination of the skin's appearance. A skin biopsy may be performed if needed to confirm the diagnosis. Medical history and family history may also be considered.

== Treatment ==
Erythema marginatum can be treated with hydrocortisone and adrenocorticotropic hormone (ACTH).

In cases where the condition is associated with ARF and severe carditis, corticosteroids are indicated alongside the classic treatment protocol for ARF which is a 10-day course of oral Penicillin. Alternatively, one dosage of Penicillin G benzathine may be injected intramuscularly followed by a daily course of oral Amoxicillin for a total of 10 days. In cases of Penicillin allergy, a Cephalosporin or Macrolide may be considered. To avoid recurrences of ARF, secondary prevention is warranted. This may include a period of antibiotic prophylaxis determined by the presence of carditis and the amount of remaining heart damage.
