= House of the Good Samaritan =

- Boston Children's Hospital

Geography
- Location: Boston, Massachusetts, United States
- Coordinates: 42.336286°N 71.108205°W

History
- Constructed: 1860
- Opened: 1861
- Closed: 1973
- Demolished: 1979

Links
- Lists: Hospitals in Massachusetts

The House of the Good Samaritan (sometimes called the Boston Good Samaritan Hospital) was a charitable, Boston hospital founded by Anne Smith Robbins in 1860. It accepted its first patients in 1861 and was established to care for destitute, chronically ill women and children. The hospital became affiliated in 1946 with Boston Children's Hospital. It was legally incorporated into Boston Children's Hospital in March 1967.

== History from 1860 to 1905 ==
In early 1860, Anne Smith Robbins, enabled by an inheritance from her aunt, started the plan for the House of the Good Samaritan. The physician Henry Jacob Bigelow and some of his colleagues approved her plan. The charitable hospital, with only a few beds, opened in 1861 at 4 McLean Street, Boston (not far from Massachusetts General Hospital). Under the leadership of the Boston physician Buckminister Brown (1819–1891), the House of the Good Samaritan opened in 1864 the USA's first orthopedic ward for children. In its first few decades the hospital focused on orthopedics, but only a few patients could be accommodated.

== History from 1905 to 1929 ==
In 1905 the House of the Good Samaritan moved from McLean Street to a new location with a larger hospital at the corner of Binney Street and Francis Street. It was the first of the hospitals very close to Harvard Medical School in Boston's Longwood Medical and Academic Area. In its early years at its new location, most of the hospital's patients were victims of advanced tuberculosis. In 1906 the hospital operated the first summer and winter camp for tuberculosis patients in Massachusetts. By 1911 the State of Massachusetts and the city of Boston had taken over the care of tuberculosis patients, so the hospital's Board of Managers voted to admit cancer patients. In 1906 the hospital operated the first summer and winter camp for tuberculosis patients in Massachusetts. By 1911 the State of Massachusetts and the city of Boston had taken over the care of tuberculosis patients, so the hospital's Board of Managers voted to admit cancer patients. In 1916 the hospital had 64 beds. By 1921 several wards were devoted to patients with rheumatic fever or rheumatic heart disease.

== History from 1929 to 1967 ==
By 1929 the state of Massachusetts and the city of Boston had provided facilities for cancer patients, so the House of the Good Samaritan's Board of Managers decided to focus on patients with rheumatic fever and related diseases. From 1929 to 1947 the physician T. Duckett Jones was the director of the hospital's research department for investigation of rheumatic fever and related diseases. The House of the Good Samaritan was one of the USA's first institutions to specialize in the treatment and study of rheumatic fever and its sequelae. By 1931 the "entire hospital was given over to the treatment and study of rheumatic fever and related diseases". After WW II, Benedict Frank Massell (1906–2008) was the hospital's Chief of the Rheumatic Fever Division. During his tenure, care was free for the patients and totally supported by private philanthropy. All of the hospital's 80 beds were committed to children or adolescents suffering from rheumatic fever or its complications. Before the widespread use of penicillin and other antibiotics, rheumatic fever was one of the major causes of death in childhood. T. Duckett Jones and his associates organized studies of rheumatic fever dating back to 1921 at the House of the Good Samaritan. The hospital's records provide a huge store of clinical information in the history of rheumatic fever and its complications. The hospital ceased to exist as an autonomous institution in 1967. In 1973 Boston Children's Hospital completely closed the House of the Good Samaritan because there were so few cases of rheumatic fever.

== Historic building demolished ==
In Boston in 1905, the House of the Good Samaritan was moved from 4 McLean Street to 25 Binney Street. The Binney Street building was designed and built by the architectural firm of Andrews, Jaques & Rantoul. It was demolished in 1979.
