= Nikolay Anichkov =

Russian pathologist

- Born: Nikolay Nikolayevich Anichkov; November 3, 1885; Saint Petersburg
- Died: December 7, 1964 (aged 79)
- Citizenship: Russian
- Education: Imperial Military Medical Academy, St. Petersburg
- Known for: Atherosclerosis research
- Scientific career
- Fields: Pathology

Nikolay Nikolayevich Anichkov (Russian: Никола́й Никола́евич Ани́чков, often spelled Anitschkow in German literature) (1885, Saint Petersburg – 1964) was a prominent pathologist of Russian heritage. Anichkov first described the specialized myocardial cells (Anitschkow cell, cardiac histiocyte) and discovered the significance and role of cholesterol in atherosclerosis pathogenesis. In 1958, in an editorial in Annals of Internal Medicine, William Dock compared the significance of the classic work of Anichkov to that of the discovery of the tubercle bacillus by Robert Koch. American biochemist D. Steinberg wrote: "If the full significance of his findings had been appreciated at the time, we might have saved more than 30 years in the long struggle to settle the cholesterol controversy and Anitschkow might have won a Nobel Prize". Anichkov elaborated on the doctrines of reticuloendothelial system and autogenic infections.

== Early life and training ==
His father, Nikolay M. Anichkov (1844–1916), was a representative of ancient Russian nobility and held the position of Vice-Minister of Education of the Russian Empire. His mother, L. I. Vasiliyeva (1859–1924), was the daughter of a priest that was founder of the Alexander Nevsky Orthodox church in Rue Daru, Paris. In 1903, Anichkov entered the Imperial Military Medical Academy in St. Petersburg. There, he became a pupil of prominent Russian histologist Alexander A. Maximow (1874–1928) and later, in Freiburg, a pupil of the German pathologist Karl Albert Ludwig Aschoff (1866–1942). Upon his graduation in 1909, Anichkov began to work on his doctoral thesis, titled Inflammatory changes in myocardium: apropos of myocarditis, and he successfully defended it in 1912. In this thesis, he first described the specific heart macrophages that today bear his name Anitschkow cell. At the same time, Anichkov worked on an experimental model of atherosclerosis together with a student, S. Chalatov. They created a model of experimental atherosclerosis.

== Career in Germany and Russia ==
In 1912, Anichkov moved to Freiburg to work under German pathologist L. Aschoff. The latter was interested in Anichkov's experimental work done in Russia. In Germany he became the first to describe cholesterinesterphagozyten, German for 'cholesteryl ester phagocytes', which derive from macrophages and today are known as foam cells. By histologically analyzing the development of atherosclerotic plaque, Anichkov identified the cell types involved in the atherosclerotic process: smooth muscle cells, macrophages, and lymphocytes. He discovered the leading role of cholesterol in atherosclerosis development ("There is no atherosclerosis without cholesterol").

Anichkov worked in Aschoff's laboratory up to the time World War I broke out in August 1914. He joined the Russian Army Medical Corps and, from 1914 to 1917, was a physician-in-charge.

In 1920, Anichkov was appointed Professor of the Department of Pathological physiology of the Military Medical Academy, a position that he held until 1939. He presented updates on atherosclerosis research at the Congresses in Berlin, Freiburg, Würzburg and Wiesbaden, and at meetings of the Swedish Society of Pathologists, and the International Society of Geographic Pathology. In 1930, after the Congress in Osaka, he went to Tokyo, Niigata, and Kyoto, to deliver a lecture "On experimental atherosclerosis of the coronary arteries of the heart". He wrote a chapter in E.V. Cowdry's Arteriosclerosis: A Survey of the Problem in 1933.

In 1939-46, the lieutenant-general of Medical Corps Anichkov headed the Military Medical Academy's Department of Pathological anatomy. In 1942, Anichkov and A. I. Abrikosov received a State award for their textbook Pathological Anatomy of the Heart and Vessels, in which they gave a detailed account of the development of atherosclerosis and ischemic heart disease. In their 1998 book titled Medicine's 10 Greatest Discoveries, M. Friedman and M. Friedland included the Anichkov's cholesterol theory in a list of great discoveries in medicine. During Anichkov's work as President of the Academy of Medical Sciences (1946–53) he participated in the foundation of a number of research institutes and research journals. In this period and later he created a research team in Russian pathology that consisted of 30 professors and many doctors.

== Family ==
Anichkov was married twice. He had one son, Mily (1920–1991), who became a Professor of Surgery and Colonel of Medical Corps. His grandson Nikolay M. Anichkov (born in 1941) is Professor of Pathology, Member of the Russian Academy of Sciences, formerly Vice-President of the Russian Society of Pathology and head at Department of pathology in North-West State Medical University named after I.I Mechnickov, St. Petersburg, Russia (1984-2019). All N. N. Anichkov's children and colleagues remembered him as a kind-hearted man who was always fair to his coworkers and good to his friends. He died on 7 December 1964 of a myocardial infarction.

== Degrees and titles held ==
Doctor of Medicine (1909), Doctor of Sciences (1912), Professor of Pathology (1920), lieutenant-general of Medical Corps, State award holder (1940), Fellow of the USSR Academy of Sciences and the USSR Academy of Medical Sciences, President of the USSR Academy of Medical Sciences (1946–53).

== See also ==
- Pathology
- List of pathologists
