= Anti-DNase B =

Antibody produced during Strep infection

- Synonyms: Anti-DNase B
- Purpose: quantitative measure antibodies(for infection)

Anti-Deoxyribonuclease B (anti-DNase B) titres are a quantitative measure of the presence of serologic antibodies obtained from patients suspected of having a recent group A (Beta-hemolytic) streptococcus bacteria infection, from Streptococcus pyogenes.

In a patient with suspected post-streptococcal glomerulonephritis, anti-streptolysin-O titres (ASOTs) can be negative even after strep pharyngitis. Some studies suggest that up to 85% of patients with acute rheumatic fever from group A strep infection will be positive for ASO titers, leaving 15% of patients having been diagnosed with rheumatic fever negative for ASO titers. In addition and contrary to percentages seen in strep pharyngitis, strep skin infection induces ASO antibodies less often, which can be problematic for physicians searching for a cause of the glomerulonephritis and having a high suspicion that its etiology was strep.

Post-streptococcus glomerulonephritis is more often associated with group A strep skin infection than it is with strep pharyngitis, so in a patient with suspected post-strep glomerulonephritis with a negative ASO titer, one can then obtain anti-DNase-B titers which are more sensitive for group A strep and for its various strains. Anti-DNase B antibody titers also stay elevated for longer, which is useful since often ASO titers may rise, but then fall prior to the onset of the glomerulonephritis where the onset of disease is often greater than 2 weeks after the infection resolved. In this way anti-DNase B titers are very useful to clinicians and allow for evidence of the recent infection to be seen and levels of this antibody to be quantified.
