= Franz Büchner (pathologist) =

German pathologist (1895–1991)

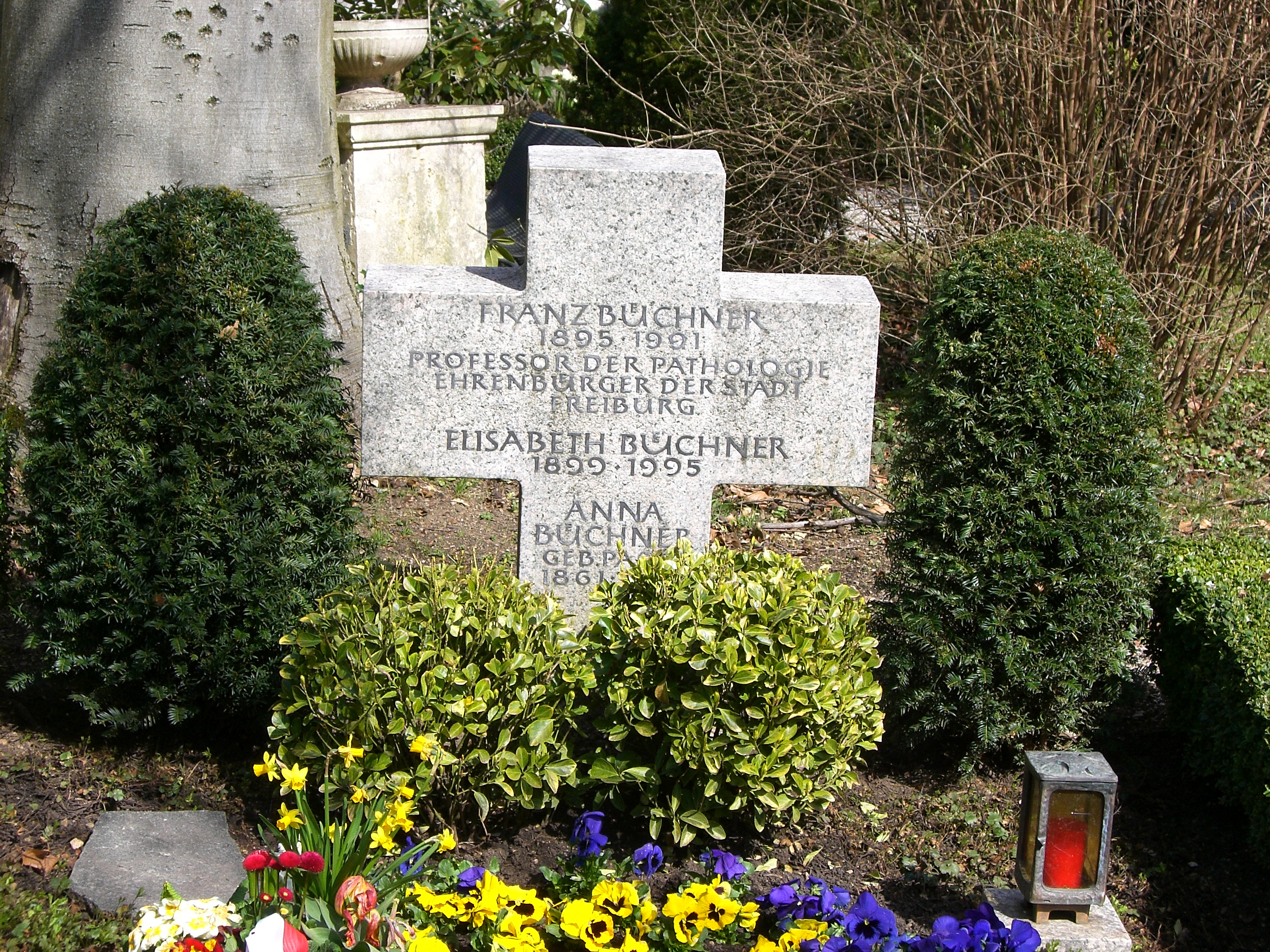
The gravestone of Franz Büchner at the main cemetery in Freiburg

Franz Büchner (20 January 1895 – 9 March 1991) was a prominent German pathologist of the 20th century. Born in Boppard in Rhineland-Palatinate, Germany, Büchner studied medicine and natural sciences at the University of Gießen, graduating 1921. He began his career as a pathologist at the University of Freiburg, under famous pathologist Ludwig Aschoff and wrote his habilitation thesis on the diagnosis and development of gastric cancer. In 1933, he became director of the Institute for Pathology at the Friedrichshain Hospital in Berlin and in 1934 he began teaching as a professor at the University of Berlin. Büchner returned to Freiburg in 1936 to head the Institute of Pathology at the university, a position he held until his retirement in 1963.

Franz Büchner did not only make a name for himself for his research on the role of hypoxia in congenital malformations, but also for his public criticism of the Nazi euthanasia program. In November, 1941, Büchner held a speech at the University of Freiburg criticizing the program. It is one of the few known occasions of a prominent physician speaking out against these practices. Later in life, Büchner also became a staunch critic of abortion.

Büchner was awarded with several medals for his work, including the Order of St. Gregory the Great, the Paracelsus Medal of the German medical establishment, and the Romano Guardini Prize as well as several honorary doctorates. He died in 1991 in Freiburg im Breisgau.
