= T. Duckett Jones =

American cardiologist (1899–1954)

Thomas Duckett Jones (February 2, 1899, Petersburg, Virginia – November 22, 1954, New York City) was an American physician, cardiologist, and leading expert on rheumatic fever and rheumatic heart disease. He is known for the "Jones criteria" in the diagnosis of rheumatic fever. Jones's diagnostic criteria are still in use, although with multiple modifications.

== Education and career ==
Jones graduated in 1919 from the Virginia Military Institute and in 1923 from the University of Virginia School of Medicine. At the University of Virginia Hospital he was a medical intern from 1923 to 1924 and a medical resident from 1924 to 1925. At Massachusetts General Hospital from 1925 to 1926 he was a Dalton fellow and a medical resident in cardiology. During the academic year 1925–1926, Paul Dudley White became his mentor and collaborated with him on six scientific papers. Jones was an instructor at the University of Virginia School of Medicine from 1926 to 1927 and from 1927 to 1928 a research fellow at the hospital medical school of University College London.

Jones spent most of his career in Boston. At the Boston hospital named the House of the Good Samaritan, he was the chief resident physician from 1928 to 1929 and from 1929 to 1947 the founding director of the research department for investigation of rheumatic fever and rheumatic heart disease. At Massachusetts General Hospital from 1929 to 1947 he was also a member of the medical staff and, under the supervision of Paul Dudley White, initiated and developed the rheumatic fever clinic. At Harvard Medical School, Jones joined the teaching staff in 1928 and was promoted to assistant professor in 1941. In 1947 he resigned his assistant professorship and moved to New York City, but continued as a lecturer at Harvard Medical School. In New York City from 1947 until his final illness and death in 1954 in Petersburg, Virginia, he was the director of the Helen Hay Whitney Foundation.

The 1936 and 1952 papers on the natural history of rheumatic fever, written by Edward Franklin Bland and T. Duckett Jones, are considered classics.

Jones served in various capacities, including the vice-presidency of the American Heart Association. At his death he was president-elect of the National Health Council.

In his honor, the American Heart Association established the annual T. Duckett Jones Memorial Lecture. The first lecture Rheumatism — Then and Now was presented by Paul Dudley White in 1962.

== Family ==
T. Duckett Jones had three brothers and four sisters. One of his brothers, Herbert Claiborne Jones (1897–1975), became a surgeon who served in the Pacific Theater in World War II. Their father was Dr. J. Bolling Jones (1871–1950), who served as president of the Virginia Medical Society. Of Bolling Jones's four daughters, one became a physician in Florida and two others married physicians.

== Selected publications ==
- Jones, T. Duckett (1932). "The Treatment of Obstinate Chorea with Nirvanol". Journal of the American Medical Association. 99: 18–21. doi:10.1001/jama.1932.02740530020006.
- Jones, T. Duckett; Mote, John R. (1934). "The Phases of Foreign Protein Sensitization in Human Beings". New England Journal of Medicine. 210 (3): 120–123. doi:10.1056/NEJM193401182100302.
- Bland, E. F.; Jones, T. D. (1935). "Clinical observations on the events preceding the appearance of rheumatic fever" (PDF). The Journal of Clinical Investigation. 14 (5): 633–648. doi:10.1172/JCI100712. PMC 424716. PMID 16694335.
- Jones, T. Duckett (1935). "Clinical Significance of Chorea as a Manifestation of Rheumatic Fever". Journal of the American Medical Association. 105 (8): 571–577. doi:10.1001/jama.1935.02760340017007.
- Bland, E. F.; Jones, T. D. (1936). "The Natural History of Rheumatic Fever and Rheumatic Heart Disease". Transactions of the American Clinical and Climatological Association. 52: 85–87. PMC 2242134. PMID 21407521.
- Jones, T. Duckett (1938). "Heart Disease in Childhood". American Journal of Public Health and the Nation's Health. 28 (5): 637–643. doi:10.2105/AJPH.28.5.637. PMC 1529176. PMID 18014846.
- Bland, Edward F.; Jones, T. Duckett (1939). "The Delayed Appearance of Heart Disease After Rheumatic Fever". Journal of the American Medical Association. 113 (15): 1380–1383. doi:10.1001/jama.1939.02800400008003.
- Wheeler, S. M.; Foley, G. E.; Jones, T. Duckett (1941). "A Bubbler Pump Method for Quantitative Estimations of Bacteria in the Air". Science. 94 (2445): 445–446. Bibcode:1941Sci....94..445W. doi:10.1126/science.94.2445.445. PMID 17758322.
- Massell, Benedict F.; Dow JW; Jones TD (1948). "Orally Administered Penicillin in Patients with Rheumatic Fever". Journal of the American Medical Association. 138 (14): 1030–1036. doi:10.1001/jama.1948.02900140022005. PMID 18890448.
- Bland EF; Jones TD (1952). "The Natural History of Rheumatic Fever: A 20 Year Perspective". Annals of Internal Medicine. 37 (5): 1006–1026. doi:10.7326/0003-4819-37-5-1006. PMID 12986608.
