= Ludwig Aschoff =

German physician and pathologist (1866-1942)

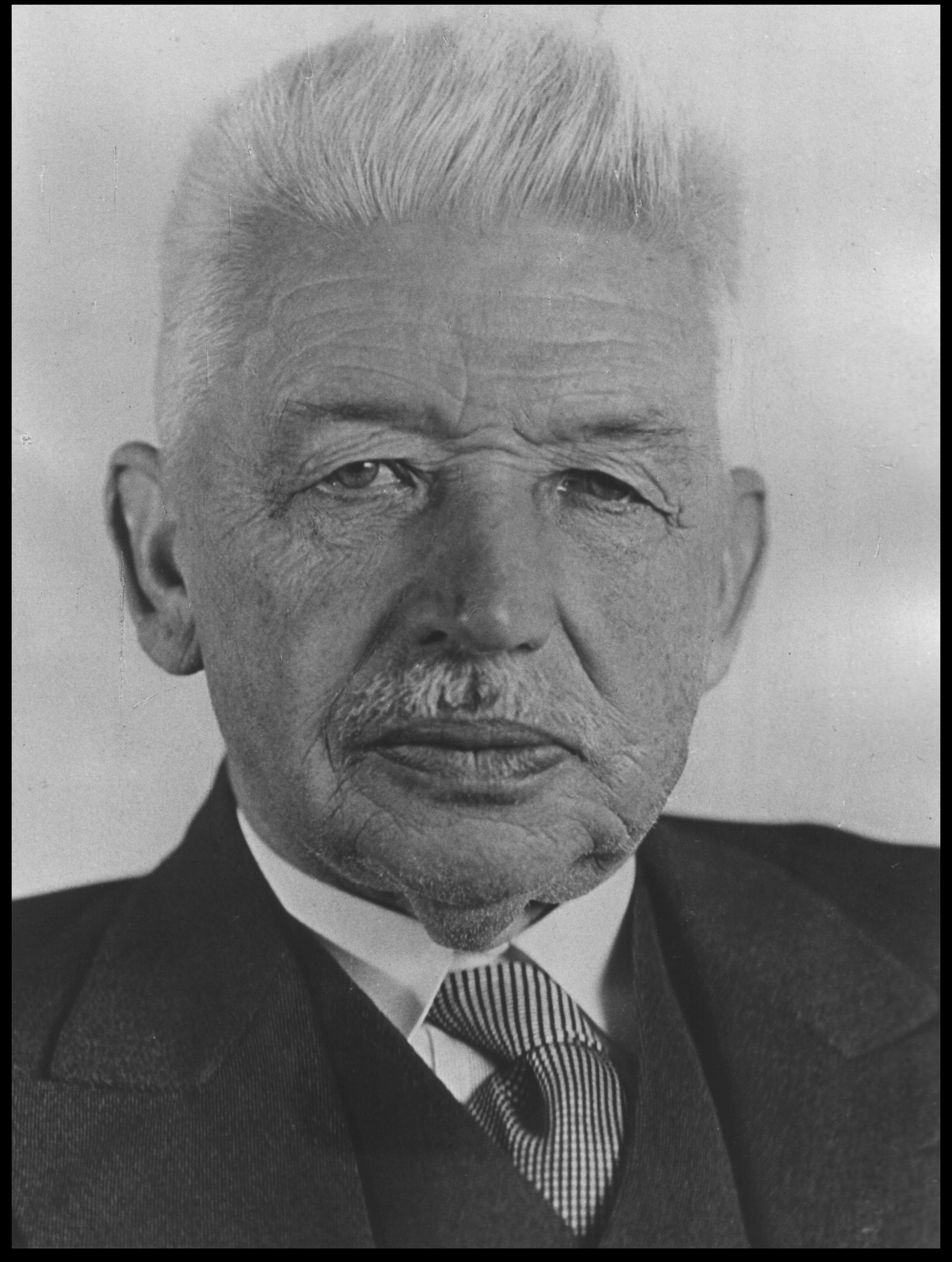
- Karl Albert Ludwig Aschoff
- Born: 10 January 1866; Berlin, Prussia
- Died: 24 June 1942 (aged 76); Freiburg, Germany
- Education: University of Bonn; University of Strasbourg; University of Würzburg
- Known for: Cardiac pathology, atrioventricular node, Aschoff bodies
- Scientific career
- Fields: Pathology
- Workplaces: University of Göttingen; University of Marburg; University of Freiburg

Karl Albert Ludwig Aschoff (10 January 1866 – 24 June 1942) was a German physician and pathologist. He is considered to be one of the most influential pathologists of the early 20th century and is regarded as the most important German pathologist after Rudolf Virchow.

== Early life and education ==
Aschoff was born in Berlin, Prussia on 10 January 1866. He studied medicine at the University of Bonn, University of Strasbourg, and the University of Würzburg.

== Career ==
After his habilitation in 1894, Ludwig Aschoff was appointed professor for pathology at the University of Göttingen in 1901. Aschoff transferred to the University of Marburg in 1903 to head the department for pathological anatomy. In 1906, he accepted a position as ordinarius at the University of Freiburg, where he remained until his death.

Aschoff was interested in the pathology and pathophysiology of the heart. He discovered nodules in the myocardium present during rheumatic fever, the so-called Aschoff bodies. Aschoff's reputation attracted students from all over the world, among them Sunao Tawara. Together they discovered and described the atrioventricular node (AV node, Aschoff-Tawara node). Numerous travels abroad, to England, Canada, Japan, and the U.S. led to many research connections, whereas the trips to Japan proved to be especially productive. Aschoff's popularity in Japanese medicine had its roots in his work with Tawara and a journey through Japan in 1924. In the early 20th century, 23 of 26 Japanese pathological institutes were headed by students of Aschoff.

Among his pathological studies was also the issue of racial differences. "Pathology of constitution" invented by him became a special branch of research of National Socialist (Nazi) doctors under the name of "military pathology". Franz Buechner is reported to be Aschoff's most prominent pupil. One of Aschoff's sons, Jürgen Aschoff, went on to become one of the founders of the field of chronobiology.

== Death ==
Aschoff died on 24 June 1942 in Freiburg, Germany.

== Personal life ==
His grave is preserved in the Protestant Friedhof I der Jerusalems- und Neuen Kirchengemeinde (Cemetery No. I of the congregations of Jerusalem's Church and New Church) in Berlin-Kreuzberg, south of Hallesches Tor.

== See also ==
- Rokitansky–Aschoff sinuses
- Pathology
- List of pathologists
