= Aschoff body =

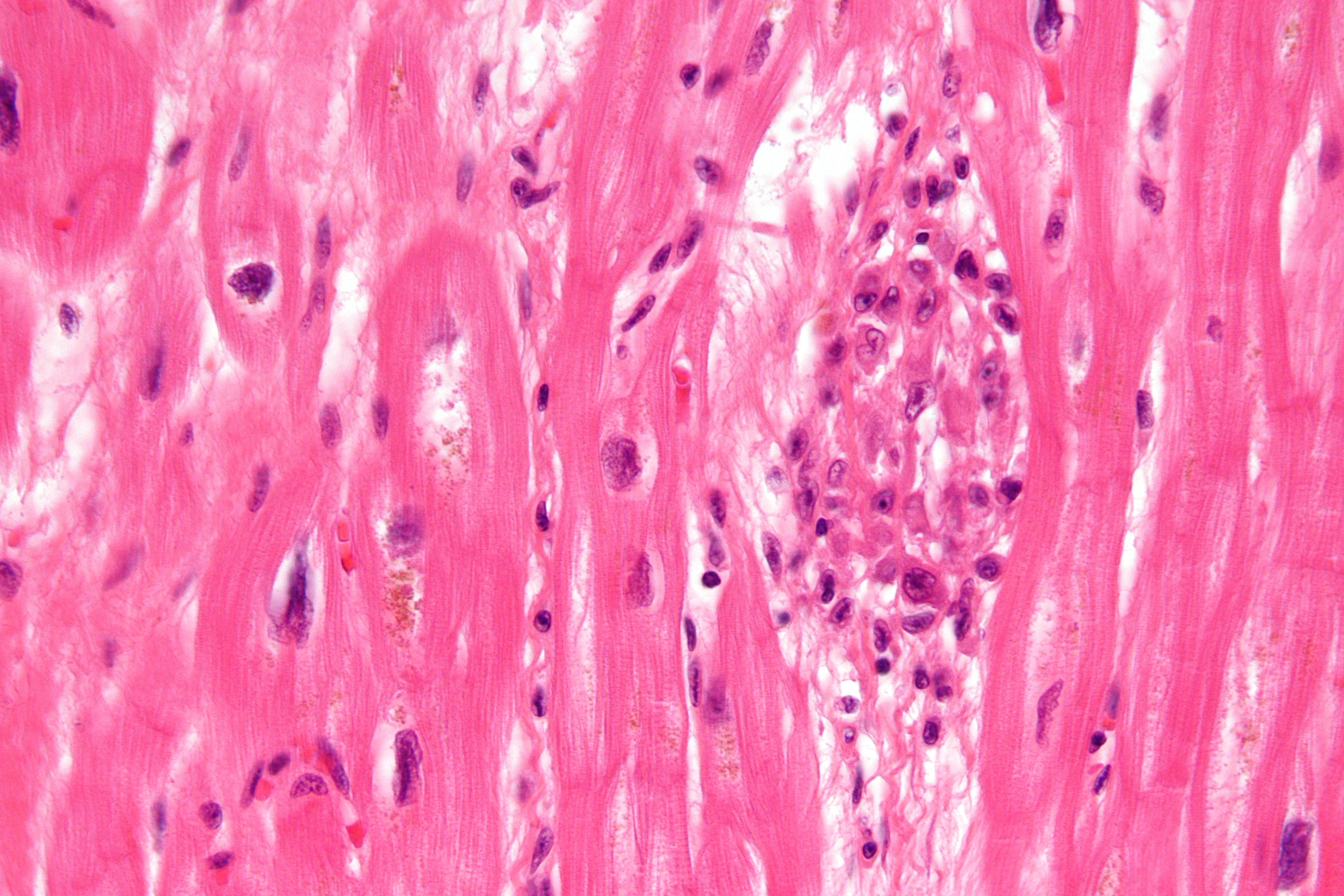
- Aschoff bodies are microscopic structures seen in patient with rheumatic fever
- Differential diagnosis: rheumatic fever

In medicine, Aschoff bodies are nodules found in the hearts of individuals with rheumatic fever. They result from inflammation in the heart muscle and are characteristic of rheumatic heart disease. These nodules were discovered independently by Ludwig Aschoff and Paul Rudolf Geipel, and for this reason they are occasionally called Aschoff–Geipel bodies.

== Appearance ==
Microscopically, Aschoff bodies are areas of inflammation of the connective tissue of the heart, or focal interstitial inflammation. Fully developed Aschoff bodies are granulomatous structures consisting of fibrinoid change, lymphocytic infiltration, occasional plasma cells, and characteristically abnormal macrophages surrounding necrotic centres. Some of these macrophages may fuse to form multinucleated giant cells. Others may become Anitschkow cells or "caterpillar cells," so named because of the appearance of their chromatin.

They are pathognomic foci of fibrinoid necrosis found in many sites, most often the myocardium. Initially they are surrounded by lymphocytes, macrophages, and a few plasma cells, but they are slowly replaced by a fibrous scar. Aschoff bodies are found in all the three layers of the heart, least chance in the pericardium.

== Presence in cardiac lesions ==
The cardiac manifestations of rheumatic fever are in the form of focal inflammatory involvement of the interstitial tissue in all 3 layers of the heart, a pathological change named pancarditis. The pathognomonic feature of pancarditis in the case of rheumatic heart disease is the presence of Aschoff nodules or Aschoff bodies.

== Detailed description ==
The Aschoff nodules are foci of T lymphocytes, occasional plasma cells, and activated macrophages (Anitschkow cells) pathognomonic of rheumatic fever. These macrophages have abundant cytoplasm and central round nuclei in which chromatin condenses into a central, slender, wavy ribbon, the reason why they are sometimes called "caterpillar cells". They are especially found in the vicinity of small blood vessels in the myocardium and endocardium and occasionally in the pericardium, and also the adventitia of the proximal part of the aorta. Lesions similar to the Aschoff nodules may also be found in extra-cardiac tissues.

== Evolution of nodules ==
Evolution of Aschoff nodules typically involve 3 stages of development all of which may be present in the heart at the same time of inspection.

Stage 1. Early exudative / degenerative stage the earliest sign of injury to the heart in rheumatic fever is apparent by fourth week of illness. Initially there is edema of the connective tissue and increase in acid mucopolysaccharide in the ground substance. This results in a separation of the collagen fibre by accumulating ground substance eventually the collagen fibres are fragmented and disintegrated and the affected focus takes the appearance and staining characteristics of fibrin.

Stage 2. Intermediate proliferative / granulomatous stage. It is at this stage of Aschoff bodies, which is pathognomonic of rheumatic fever. This stage is apparent in 4 to 13 weeks of illness. The early stage of fibrinoid change is replaced by infiltration of lymphocyte T cells, plasma cells, neutrophils and the characteristic cardiac histiocytes / Anitschkow cells at the margin of the lesion. Cardiac Histiocytes / Anitschkow are present in small numbers in the heart but their numbers are increased in Aschoff nodules. therefore they are not characteristic of rheumatic heart disease

Stage 3. Late fibrosis stage. It is the stage of healing by which the fibrosis of the Aschoff nodules occur in 12 to 16 weeks after the illness. The nodule becomes oval or fusiform in shape about 200 micrometer x 600 micrometer in width and length. With passage of months and years the Aschoff nodules becomes less cellular and collagenous tissue is increased. Eventually it is replaced by a small fibrocollagenous scar with little cellularity frequently located perivascularly.

== History ==
The Aschoff bodies were discovered independently by the German pathologist Ludwig Aschoff 1904 and one year later by Paul Rudolf Geipel.
