= Anitschkow cell =

Cells associated with rheumatic heart disease

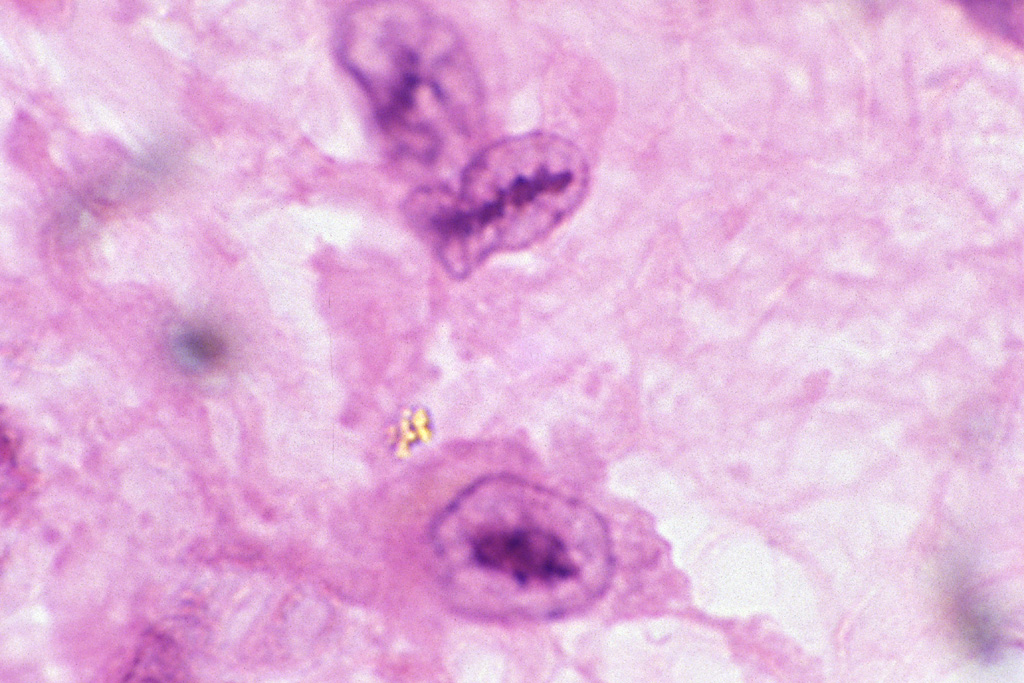
H&E stain demonstrating Anitschkow cells in rheumatic heart disease.

In pathology, Anitschkow (or Anichkov) cells are often cells associated with rheumatic heart disease. Anitschkow cells are enlarged macrophages found within granulomas (called Aschoff bodies) associated with the disease.

The cells are also called caterpillar cells, as they have an ovoid nucleus and chromatin that is condensed toward the center of the nucleus in a wavy rod-like pattern that to some resembles a caterpillar. Larger Anitschkow cells may coalesce to form multinucleated Aschoff giant cells. Anitschkow cells were named after the Russian pathologist Nikolay Anichkov.

Squamous epithelial cells with nuclear changes resembling Anitschkow cells have also been observed in recurrent aphthous stomatitis, iron deficiency anemia, children receiving chemotherapy, as well as in healthy individuals.
