= Carditis =

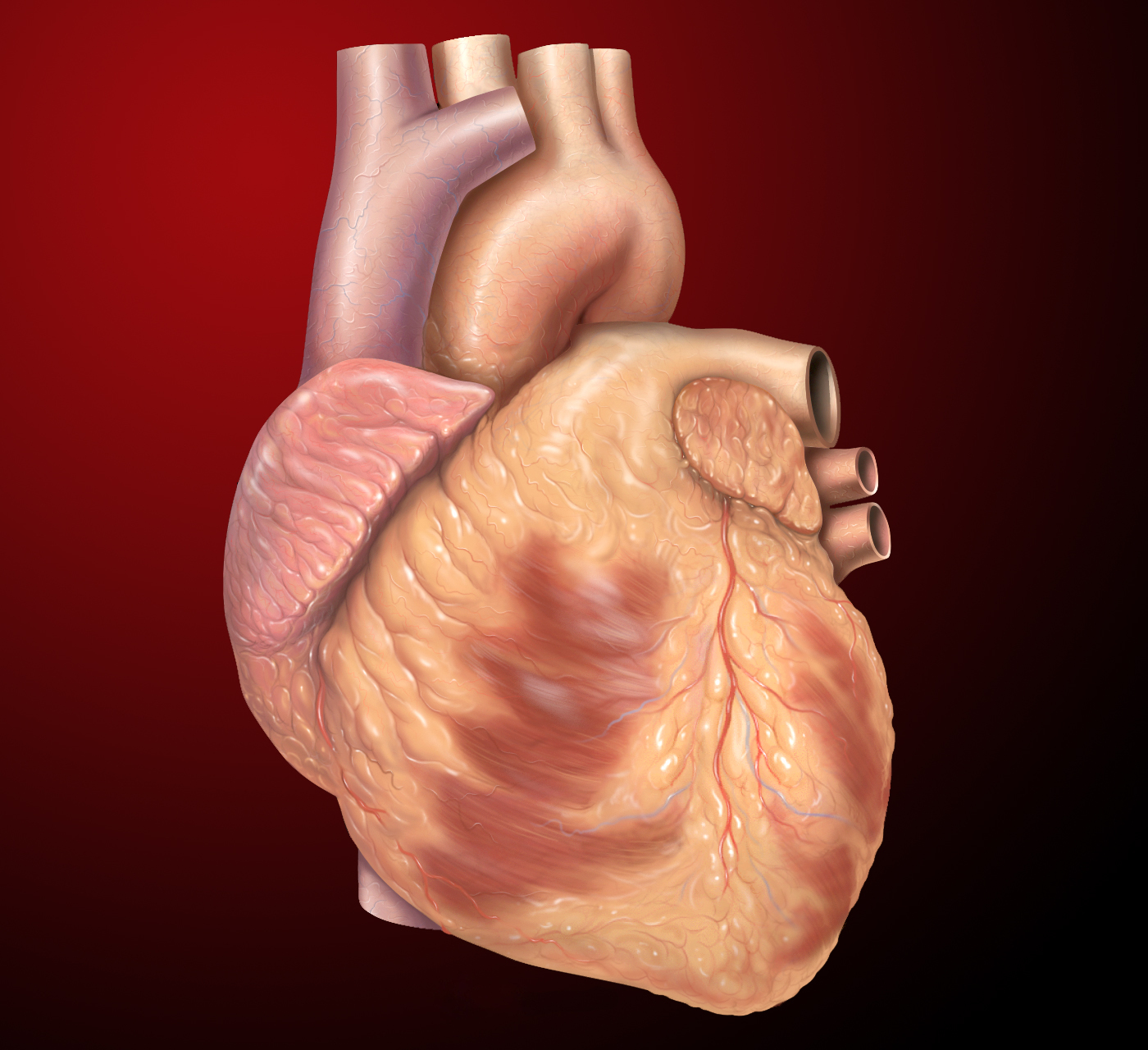
- Specialty: Cardiology Immunology
- Symptoms: Angina
- Complications: death
- Causes: bacteria virus

Carditis (pl. carditides) is the inflammation of the heart.

It is usually studied and treated by specifying it as:

- Pericarditis is the inflammation of the pericardium
- Myocarditis is the inflammation of the heart muscle
- Endocarditis is the inflammation of the endocardium
- Pancarditis, also called perimyoendocarditis, is the inflammation of the entire heart: the pericardium, the myocardium and the endocardium
- Reflux carditis refers to a possible outcome of esophageal reflux (also known as GERD), and involves inflammation of the esophagus/stomach mucosa
