= Anti-streptolysin O =

Antibody against streptolysin O

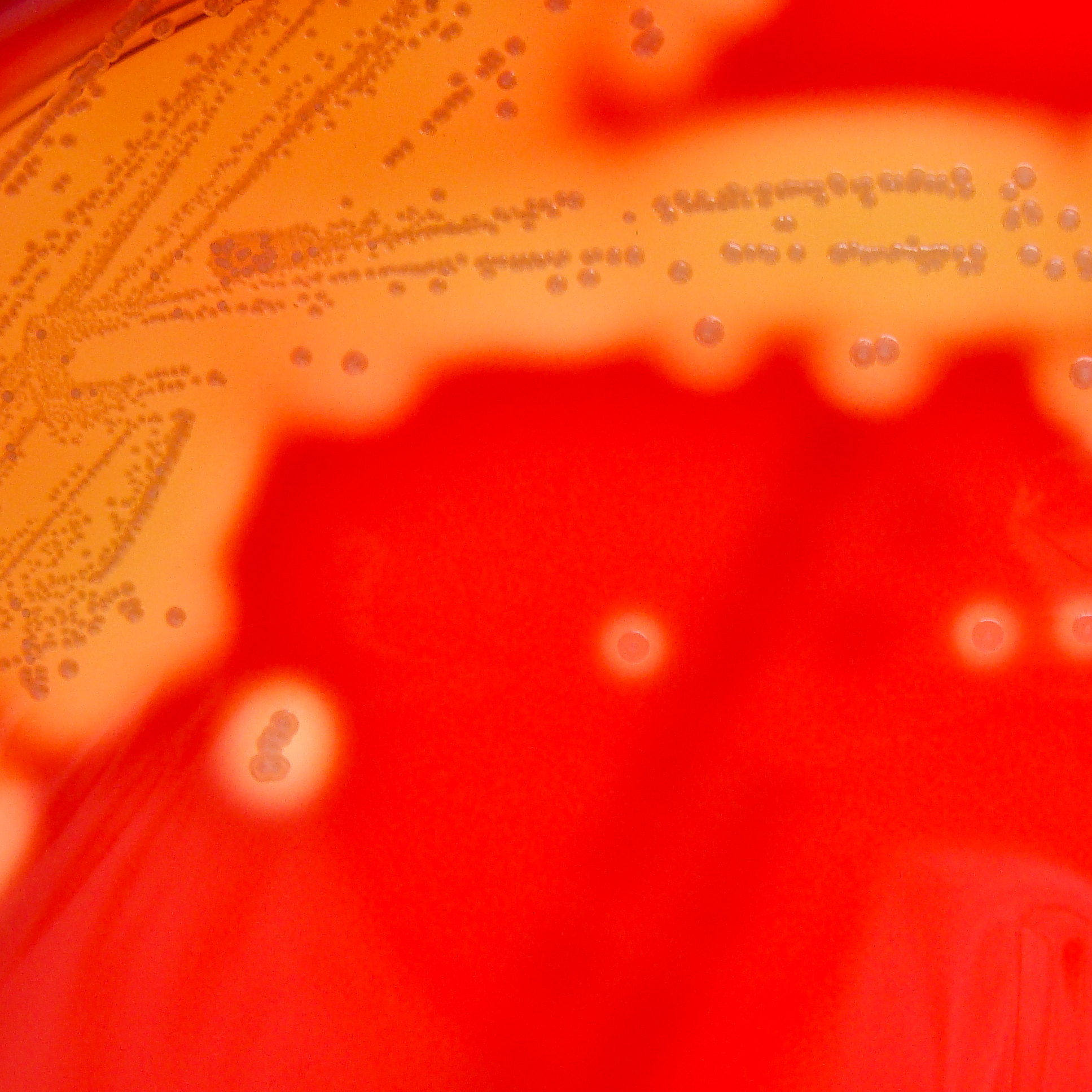

Anti-streptolysin O (ASO or ASLO) is the antibody made against streptolysin O, an immunogenic, oxygen-labile streptococcal hemolytic exotoxin produced by most strains of group A and many strains of groups C and G Streptococcus bacteria. The "O" in the name stands for oxygen-labile; the other related toxin being oxygen-stable streptolysin-S. The main function of streptolysin O is to cause hemolysis (the breaking open of red blood cells)—in particular, beta-hemolysis.

Increased levels of ASO titre in the blood could cause damage to the heart and joints. In most cases, penicillin is used to treat patients with increased levels of ASO titre.

== Clinical significance ==
When the body is infected with streptococci, it produces antibodies against the various antigens that the streptococci produce. ASO is one such antibody. A raised or rising levels can indicate past or present infection. Historically it was one of the first bacterial markers used for diagnosis and follow up of rheumatic fever or scarlet fever. Its importance in this regard has not diminished.

Since these antibodies are produced as a delayed antibody reaction to the above-mentioned bacteria, there is no normal value. The presence of these antibodies indicates an exposure to these bacteria. However, as many people are exposed to these bacteria and remain asymptomatic, the mere presence of ASO does not indicate disease.

A titre has significance only if it is greatly elevated (> 200), but a rise in titre demonstrated in paired blood samples taken days apart is more informative for diagnosis. The antibody levels begin to rise after 1 to 3 weeks of strep infection, peaks in 3 to 5 weeks and falls back to insignificant levels in 6 months. Values need to be correlated with a clinical diagnosis. The aim is to convert it .

== Estimation ==
It is done by serological methods like latex agglutination or slide agglutination. ELISA may be performed to detect the exact titre value. To detect the titre value, by a non-ELISA method, one has to perform the above agglutination using a serial dilution technique.

== Mechanism of action ==
These antibodies produced against the bacteria cross-react with human antigens (mainly collagen) and hence attack the cellular matrix of various organs, mainly the heart, joints, skin, brain, etc.

== Antistreptolysin O titre ==
Antistreptolysin O titre (AS(L)O titer or AS(L)OT) is a measure of the blood plasma levels of antistreptolysin O antibodies used in tests for the diagnosis of a streptococcal infection or indicate a past exposure to streptococci. The ASOT helps direct antimicrobial treatment and is used to assist in the diagnosis of scarlet fever, rheumatic fever, and post infectious glomerulonephritis.

A positive test usually is > 200 units/mL, but normal ranges vary from laboratory to laboratory and by age.

The false negatives rate is 20 to 30%. If a false negative is suspected, then an anti-DNase B titre should be sought. False positives can result from liver disease and tuberculosis.
