= José Freitas Siqueira Jr. =

José Freitas Siqueira Jr. (born October 1967) is a Brazilian scientist and endodontist.

== Life and career ==
José Freitas Siqueira Jr. was born in Miracema, Rio de Janeiro, Brazil, in October 1967. He received his DDS from Gama Filho University, Rio de Janeiro in 1989, and his endodontic certificate from Federal University of Rio de Janeiro in 1991. In 1996, he received his master's degree in microbiology and immunology from Federal University of Rio de Janeiro. He concluded his PhD in microbiology and immunology in 1998 at Federal University of Rio de Janeiro. Since 2002, Siqueira is the chairman of endodontics, director of the postgraduate program in endodontics and head of the molecular microbiology laboratory at Estácio de Sá University, in Rio de Janeiro, Brazil.

Siqueira has made important contributions to the field of endodontics, specially working with microbiological issues. Along with his colleague Isabela Rôças, he developed several studies using molecular biology methods that helped to decipher the diversity of the microbiota infecting dental root canals. They were pioneers in the use of several molecular techniques to unravel the identity of endodontic pathogens. They for the first time detected several oral pathogens in association with apical periodontitis and abscesses, including Treponema denticola (year 2000), Treponema socranskii (year 2001), other treponemes (years 2003-2008), Filifactor alocis (year 2003), Synergistota species and many other cultivable and uncultivated species/phylotypes.

Siqueira and Rôças pioneered the profiling of endodontic bacterial communities, showing great interindividual variability and association of some profiles with disease conditions. Based on their findings and experience, in 2009, Siqueira and Rôças proposed a model for causation of apical periodontitis, in which the disease is a result of the collective pathogenicity of the bacterial communities in the canal - the concept of the community as the unit of pathogenicity. Studies from Dr. Siqueira's laboratory in collaboration with researchers from other countries also revealed that the composition of endodontic microbiota can vary from country to country, and this may impact on the antimicrobial treatment outcome. Dr. Siqueira has also been involved in the development of clinical trials evaluating the antimicrobial effectiveness of techniques and substances used during root canal treatments.

Dr. Siqueira published more than 350 scientific papers in peer-reviewed journal. He authored 11 books about Endodontics, Microbiology and Immunology. He also wrote chapters for the most famous international endodontic textbooks. His ISI H-index, which measures both the productivity and impact of the published work of a scientist, is 53, one of the highest in the field.

As major honors for the contribution of his work to the field of Endodontics, José Siqueira received the 2014 Louis I. Grossman Award from the American Association of Endodontists (AAE) and the 2012 Louis I. Grossman Award from the Societe Française d'Endodontie (SFE), maximum honors from both entities awarded to a researcher. Since 2008, is one of the few teachers from outside the United States to appear on the Recommended Speakers List of the American Association of Endodontists, whose names are endorsed by the Association for Continuing Education courses for credit in that country. He has been lecturing worldwide.

Dr. Siqueira is a member of the editorial board and ad hoc reviewer of numerous international journals, having served as an Associate Editor for the Journal of Endodontics from 2006 to 2008 and is currently a member of the Scientific Advisory Board of the Journal of Endodontics and the Editorial Board of the Journal of Oral Microbiology and ENDO-Endodontic Practice Today journal.

== Awards and recognition ==
- 2017 Journal of Endodontics Award - Basic Research: Technology to the article: "Adjunctive steps for disinfection of the mandibular molar root canal system: a correlative bacteriologic, micro-computed tomography, and cryopulverization approach". Alves FR, Andrade-Junior CV, Marceliano-Alves MF, Perez AR, Rôças IN, Versiani MA, Sousa-Neto MD, Provenzano JC, Siqueira JF Jr. J Endod 2016;42:1667-72. American Association of Endodontists.
- 2016 Journal of Endodontics Award - Honorable Mention to "Ricucci D, Siqueira JF Jr., Lopes WS, Vieira AR, Rôças IN (2015). Extraradicular infection as the cause of persistent symptoms: a case series. J Endod 41: 265-273". American Association of Endodontists.
- 2015 American Association of Endodontics Recommended Speaker (Lecturer recommended by the AAE for conferences and courses that generate Continuing Education Credits), American Association of Endodontists.
- 2014 Louis I. Grossman Award (for the contribution of his work to the growth of Endodontics), American Association of Endodontists.
- 2012 Louis I. Grossman Award (for the scientific contribution to Endodontics), Societé Française d´Endodontie.
- 2012 Penn Endo Homage (for service and dedication to Endodontics), Penn Endo - Rio 2012 (during SBDT International Congress).
- 2009 Samuel Seltzer Prize, Endodontology - Best article 2008-2009 "Clinical outcome of the endodontic treatment of teeth with apical periodontitis using an antimicrobial", Oral Surgery Oral Medicine Oral Pathology Oral Radiology and Endodontology.
- 2008 American Association of Endodontics Recommended Speaker (Lecturer recommended by the AAE for conferences and courses that generate Continuing Education Credits), American Association of Endodontists.

== Bibliography ==
=== Books ===
- Ricucci, Domenico; Siqueira Jr., J.F. Endodontology. An integrated biological and clinical view. 1 ed. Tokyo: Quintessence Publishing, 2017. v. 1. 424p. (Language: Japanese)
- Lopes, Hélio P.; Siqueira Jr, José F. Endodontia: Biologia e Técnica. 4 ed. Rio de Janeiro: Elsevier, 2015. v. 1. 817p. (Language: Portuguese)
- Ricucci, Domenico; Siqueira Jr., J.F. Endodontology. An integrated biological and clinical view. 1 ed. Moscow: Azbuka, 2015. v. 1. 415p. (Language: Russian)
- Ricucci, Domenico; Siqueira Jr., J.F. Endodontology. An integrated biological and clinical view. 1 ed. New Malden: Quintessence Publishing, 2013. v. 1. 425p. (Language: English)
- Siqueira Jr, J. F. Treatment of endodontic infections. 1 ed. London: Quintessence Publishing, 2011. 403p. (Language: English)
- Lopes, Hélio P.; Siqueira Jr, José F. Endodontia: Biologia e Técnica. 3a. ed. Rio de Janeiro: Guanabara Koogan, 2010. 951p. (Language: Portuguese)
- Lopes, Hélio P.; Siqueira Jr, José F. Endodontia: Biologia e Técnica. 2a. ed. Rio de Janeiro: Guanabara Koogan/Medsi, 2004. 965p. (Language: Portuguese)
- Siqueira Jr, J. F.; Dantas, C. J. S. Mecanismos celulares e moleculares da inflamação. Rio de Janeiro: MEDSI, 2000. 240p. (Language: Portuguese)
- Lopes, H P; Siqueira Jr, J. F. Endodontia: biologia e técnica. Rio de Janeiro: medsi, 1999. v. 1. 650p. (Language: Portuguese)
- Siqueira Jr, J. F. Tratamento das infecções endodônticas. Rio de Janeiro: medsi, 1997. 196p (Language: Portuguese)
- Siqueira Jr, J. F.; Dantas, C. J. S. Inflamação: aspectos biodinâmicos das respostas inflamatória e imunológica. 1. ed. Rio de Janeiro: Pedro I, 1996. v. 1. 190p. (Language: Portuguese)
