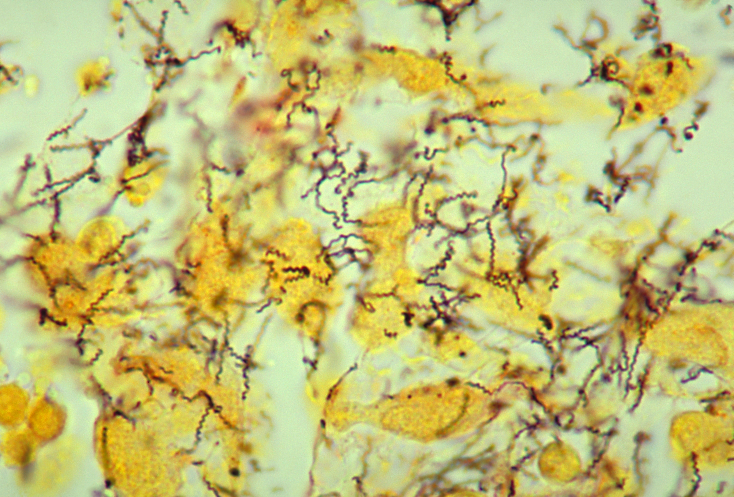
- Treponema pallidum spirochaetes

Scientific classification
- Domain: Bacteria
- Kingdom: Pseudomonadati
- Phylum: Spirochaetota
- Class: Spirochaetia
- Order: Spirochaetales
- Family: Treponemataceae
- Genus: Treponema; Schaudinn 1905 emend. Abt, Göker & Klenk 2013

Type species
- Treponema pallidum (Schaudinn & Hoffmann 1905) Schaudinn 1905

Species
- See text

Synonyms
- "Spironema" Vuillemin 1905 non Klebs 1892 non Leger & Hesse 1922 non Rafinesque 1838 non Hochst. 1842 non Lindley 1840 non Meek 1864; "Microspironema" Stiles & Pfender 1905

= Treponema =

Genus of bacteria

Treponema is a genus of spiral-shaped bacteria. The major treponeme species of human pathogens is Treponema pallidum, whose subspecies are responsible for diseases such as syphilis, bejel, and yaws.

== Pathogenicity across species ==
Only some species of Treponema are pathogenic in humans. Treponema carateum is the cause of pinta which occurs primarily in Central and South America. Treponema paraluiscuniculi is associated with syphilis in rabbits but is not infectious in humans. Treponema succinifaciens has been found in the gut microbiome of traditional rural human populations. Treponema pallidum subspecies endemicum and T. p. ssp pertenue are only moderately invasive in humans (as opposed to T. pallidum pallidum which is highly invasive).

== Phylogeny ==
Nomenclature follows the List of Prokaryotic names with Standing in Nomenclature (LPSN), with the National Center for Biotechnology Information (NCBI) taxonomy database used as an additional reference.

The trees below compare a 16S rRNA gene phylogeny from LTP_10_2024 with a genome-based phylogeny from GTDB release R11-RS232.

16S rRNA based LTP_10_2024

- Treponemataceae
  - - - Gracilinema caldarium (Pohlschröder, Leschine & Canale-Parola 1995) Brune et al. 2022
      - Zuelzera stenostrepta (Zuelzer 1912) Brune et al. 2022
    - - Breznakiella homolactica Song et al. 2022
      - - Treponema primitia Graber, Leadbetter & Breznak 2004
        - - Helmutkoenigia isoptericolens (Dröge et al. 2008) Brune et al. 2022
          - Leadbettera azotonutricia (Graber et al. 2004) Brune et al. 2022
  - - - - Brucepastera parasyntrophica Song et al. 2023
        - Teretinema zuelzerae (Canale-Parola 1980) Song et al. 2023
      - - Treponema s.s.
          - T. medium Umemoto et al. 1997
          - - T. phagedenis (Noguchi 1912) Brumpt 1922 ex Kuhnert et al. 2020
            - - T. pedis Evans et al. 2009
              - - T. denticola (Flügge 1886) Brumpt 1925 ex Chan et al. 1993
                - T. putidum Wyss et al. 2004
    - - Treponema species‑group 2
        - - T. brennaborense Schrank et al. 1999
          - - T. lecithinolyticum Wyss et al. 1999
            - T. maltophilum Wyss et al. 1996
        - - - - T. ruminis Newbrook et al. 2017
              - T. saccharophilum Paster & Canale-Parola 1986
            - - T. rectale Staton et al. 2017
              - - T. peruense Belkhou et al. 2021
                - T. succinifaciens Cwyk and Canale-Parola 1981
          - - - T. berlinense Nordhoff et al. 2005
              - T. pectinovorum Smibert & Burmeister 1983
            - - - T. bryantii Stanton & Canale-Parola 1980
                - T. porcinum Nordhoff et al. 2005
              - - T. amylovorum Wyss et al. 1997
                - - T. parvum Wyss et al. 2001 non Dobell 1912
                  - - T. socranskii
                      - T. s. paredis Smibert, Johnson & Ranney 1984
                      - - T. s. buccale Smibert, Johnson & Ranney 1984
                        - T. s. socranskii Smibert, Johnson & Ranney 1984

120 marker proteins based GTDB R11-RS232

- - Breznakiellaceae
    - - Leadbettera azotonutricia
      - - Termitinema primitia
        - Breznakiella homolactica
    - Gracilinema caldarium
  - Treponemataceae
    - - - - - Treponema_D
              - - - - - - - T. bryantii_C
                          - T. bryantii_A
                        - T. bryantii_B
                      - T. bryantii_D
                    - T. porcinum
                  - - "Ca. T. merdequi"
                    - "Ca. T. scatequi"
                - - - - T. socranskii subsp. paredis
                      - T. socranskii subsp. buccale
                    - T. socranskii subsp. socranskii
                  - T. parvum
              - - - - - "Ca. T. equi"
                      - T. succinifaciens
                    - T. peruense
                  - T. rectale
                - - - - T. ruminis
                      - "Ca. T. equifaecale"
                    - - T. saccharophilum
                      - "T. zioleckii"
                  - - T. berlinense
                    - T. pectinovorum
          - - Treponema_F
              - "Ca. T. excrementipullorum"
              - T. brennaborense
            - Treponema_G
              "Ca. T. faecavium"
        - - Treponema_C
            - T. maltophilum
            - T. lecithinolyticum
          - Treponema_I
            "Ca. T. caballi"
      - - - Treponema_B
            - - T. denticola
              - T. putidum
            - T. pedis
          - Treponema s.s.
            - - "T. vincentii"
              - T. medium
            - - T. pallidum
              - T. phagedenis
        - - - Teretinema zuelzerae
            - Brucepastera parasyntrophica
          - "Ca. Avitreponema avistercoris"
    - "Ca. Gallitreponema excrementavium"

}}

The GTDB tree shows named species clusters; accession-based placeholder species are omitted. Letter suffixes are GTDB cluster identifiers.

Unassigned Treponema species:

- T. calligyrum Noguchi 1913
- T. carateum Brumpt 1939 (pinta-causing Treponema)
- "Ca. T. intracellulare" Ohkuma et al. 2015 corrig. Oren et al. 2020
- "T. legeri" (Duboscq & Lebailly 1912) Zuelzer 1925
- "T. macrodentium" Noguchi 1912
- T. paraluisleporis Lumeij et al. 1994
- T. pertenue (Castellani 1905) Castellani & Chalmers 1910
- "T. plautii" Fong et al. 2025
- T. refringens (Schaudinn and Hofmann 1905) Castellani and Chalmers
- "T. scoliodontum" (Hoffmann 1920) Noguchi 1928 ex Smibert 1984
- "T. sinense" Huo et al. 2017 ex Fong et al. 2025
- "Ca. T. stenella" Balik et al. 2023
- "Ca. T. suis" Molbak et al. 2006 non Kujumgiev & Spassova 1967
- "Ca. T. teratonymphae" Noda et al. 2018
- "T. trimerodonta" (Hoffmann 1920) Prévot 1940

== See also ==
- List of bacteria genera
- List of bacterial orders
