= Nonvenereal endemic syphilis =

- Other names: nonvenereal syphilis, endemic syphilis, bejel
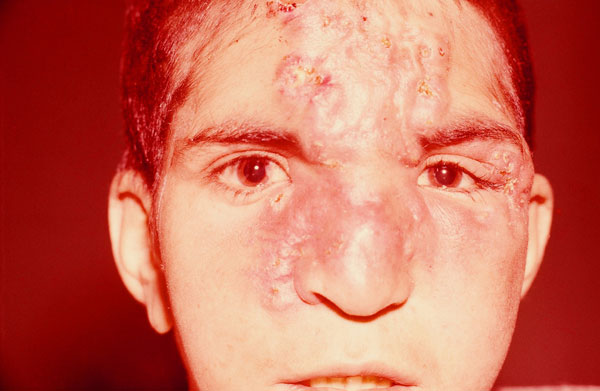
- Disfiguring infiltration of the nose, glabella, and forehead with clustered nodules in left interciliary region of boy with endemic syphilis, Iran, 2010.
- Pronunciation: /ˈbɛdʒəl/
- Specialty: Infectious disease

Bejel, or endemic syphilis, is a chronic skin and tissue disease caused by infection by the endemicum subspecies of the spirochete Treponema pallidum. Bejel is one of the "endemic treponematoses" (endemic infections caused by spiral-shaped bacteria called treponemes), a group that also includes yaws and pinta. Typically, endemic trepanematoses begin with localized lesions on the skin or mucous membranes. Pinta is limited to affecting the skin, whereas bejel and yaws are considered to be invasive because they can also cause disease in bone and other internal tissues.

== Signs and symptoms ==
Bejel usually begins in childhood as a small patch on the mucosa, often on the interior of the mouth, followed by the appearance of raised, eroding lesions on the limbs and trunk. Periostitis (inflammation) of the leg bones is commonly seen, and gummas of the nose and soft palate develop in later stages.

== Causes ==
Although the organism that causes bejel, Treponema pallidum endemicum, is morphologically and serologically indistinguishable from Treponema pallidum pallidum, which causes venereal syphilis, transmission of bejel is not venereal. However, recent epidemiological evidence suggests that Treponema pallidum endemicum may also cause venereal syphilis.

== Diagnosis ==
The diagnosis of bejel is based on the geographic history of the patient as well as laboratory testing of material from the lesions (dark-field microscopy). The responsible spirochaete is readily identifiable on sight in a microscope as a treponema.

== Epidemiology ==
Bejel has been known to be endemic in the Sahel region spanning from Mauritania and Senegal to Sudan, the other African countries of Côte d'Ivoire, Benin, and Somalia, the Kalahari Desert spanning from Namibia to Zimbabwe, West Asia spanning from Syria to Pakistan, and the Arabian Peninsula countries of Kuwait, Saudi Arabia, the United Arab Emirates, and Oman. It is unclear if it remains endemic in these countries, but a recent study suggested that the causative bacteria circulates outside of this range as venereal syphilis.

== See also ==
- Pinta (disease)
- Syphilis
- Yaws
