= Treponema maltophilum =

Scientific classification
- Domain: Bacteria
- Kingdom: Pseudomonadati
- Phylum: Spirochaetota
- Class: Spirochaetia
- Order: Spirochaetales
- Family: Treponemataceae
- Genus: Treponema
- Species: T. maltophilum

Binomial name
- Treponema maltophilum Wyss et al., 1996

Species of bacterium

Treponema maltophilum is a species of Treponema. It is implicated as a pathogen in chronic periodontitis which can induce bone loss. This motile bacillus is a gram negative, facultative anaerobe and a spirochaete.
