= Treponema socranskii =

Scientific classification
- Domain: Bacteria
- Kingdom: Pseudomonadati
- Phylum: Spirochaetota
- Class: Spirochaetia
- Order: Spirochaetales
- Family: Treponemataceae
- Genus: Treponema
- Species: T. socranskii

Binomial name
- Treponema socranskii Smibert et al. 1984

Species of bacterium

Treponema socranskii was isolated from gum swabs of people with periodontitis and clinically induced periodontitis. It is a motile, helically coiled, obligate anaerobe that grows best at 37 °C, and is a novel member of its genus because of its ability to ferment molecules that other Treponema species cannot. T. socranskii's growth is positively correlated with gingival inflammation, which indicates that it is a leading cause of gingivitis and periodontitis.

== Discovery and isolation ==
Robert Smibert, John Johnson, and Richard Ranney isolated Treponema socranskii in Virginia, 1984. Volunteers with periodontitis and clinically induced periodontitis supplied samples from beneath and above their gumlines for comparison to samples supplied from volunteers with healthy gums. The culture of T. socranskii were isolated from the samples supplied from the group of volunteers with periodontitis and clinically induced periodontitis. Periodontitis is the lasting harmful inflammation of the gum line, and clinically induced periodontitis is the condition in which healthy volunteers stop dental hygiene to induce periodontitis for controlled scientific study. Researchers used a medium that contained meat and salt water that was saturated with carbon dioxide to purge the sample of oxygen. These samples were cultured in duplicates on selective solid media plates after undergoing serial dilutions to ensure purity. These plates were placed into GasPak jars to remove any oxygen that may be present in the jar. The researchers inoculated colonies from the plates into OTI (oral treponeme isolation) broth and placed them into another GasPak jar. The jars were kept at 37 °C, and every week the samples were checked using dark-field microscopy.

== Taxonomy ==
The taxonomic lineage of Treponema socranskii is Bacteria, Spirochaetes, Spirochaetia, Spirochaetales, Spirochaetaceae, Treponema, socranskii. The subspecies were named socranskii, buccale, and paredis. Treponema socranskii is unique to its genus due to the combination of a higher average GC content and its lack of need for serum in its growth media. Three other species in the genus do not use serum, and have GC contents around 36-39 mol% whereas socranskii has a GC content of 50-52 mol%. When compared to other cultured Treponema species: denticola, pectinovorum, and vincentii, a major factor unique to socranskii is the ability to ferment different molecules. The RapID-ANA system, which is a series of qualitative tests used to identify different anaerobic bacteria, is widely used to distinguish between different oral spirochetes. This method distinguishes socranskii from other species because its only positive test is the alkaline phosphatase test, while the other species are negative for this test.

== Characterization ==
=== Optima ===
The characterization of this organism was done when it was first cultured in 1984. T. socranskii is an obligate anaerobe that grows in media that contains fermentable carbohydrates. The media must also contain liquid from an unspecified rumen or short chain fatty acids. The preferred temperature for T. socranskii is 37 °C, but it will still slightly grow between 25 °C and 42 °C.

=== Morphology ===
Treponema socranskii is helically coiled and motile using periplasmic flagella. In liquid media, it can move linearly or in a twisting screw-like motion. The cell size ranges from 6-15μm long and 0.16-0.18μm wide. The cells are wider in the center than at the ends and are curved slightly. When plated, colonies of T. socranskii form between 7–10 days after inoculation and appear white, translucent, irregular, with a dense center.

=== Ecology ===
Treponema socranskii is found in the space between the teeth and gums of patients with the varying forms of periodontitis. Of the samples taken from across sampling sites of the gum line, T. socranskii is found to be one of the most abundant of its genus. Studies on the human oral microbiome show that Gram-negative organisms including genera Treponema, Prevotella, Selenomonas, Tannerella, Haemophilus, and Catonella are not only present in samples from those with periodontitis, but they are actually selected for and have a much higher abundance than healthy samples. After treatment of periodontitis, there is a shift in the microbial community away from the Gram-negative organisms listed above, and selection for Gram-positive organisms. Healthy gumlines tend to be characterized by a low diversity of microorganisms within a single patient, but the taxa vary greatly across different individuals. Individuals with periodontitis have a high diversity of microbes, but the community structure is similar in all affected patients. These trends are due to the anaerobic and oligotrophic conditions in the diseased gums causing the anaerobic bacteria to be able to out compete the aerobic copiotrophs that usually make up the healthy communities.

=== Metabolism ===
Treponema socranskii differs from others in the genus due, in part, to its metabolism. T. socranskii is able to ferment compounds that others are not able to do so. The compounds that it can metabolize are arabinose, dextrin, fructose, galactose, glucose, glycogen, maltose, mannose, pectin, raffinose, rhamnose, ribose, starch, sucrose, trehalose, and xylose. The fermentation products are acetic, lactic, and succinic acid, with formic acid as a minor product.

=== Genomics ===
The genome of T. socranskii was sequenced by the J. Craig Venter Institute (JCVI) using Illumina sequencing. The genome contains 2,804,628 base pairs of which 2,547,778 are coding pairs. The GC content is between 50 and 52 mol%. The DNA also contains 2563 genes of which 2509 code for proteins.

== Implications ==
Treponema socranskii and 11 other organisms show an increased growth rate that correlates with an increased GI (gingival index) score. The GI score measures the intensity of the inflammation of the gingival crevice. This correlation between growth and high GI scores, combined with the frequency of T. socranskii in the gingival crevice of people with clinically induced periodontitis and moderate/severe periodontitis has implications that point toward T. socranskii being a causative agent in periodontitis and gingivitis. Periodontitis is the condition that arises after leaving gingivitis untreated. In adults, periodontitis can be a major force in the acceleration of tooth loss because it damages the base of the teeth and harms their connection to the skull. This condition is easily prevented by daily dental hygiene such as brushing and flossing.
