= Treponema lecithinolyticum =

Scientific classification
- Domain: Bacteria
- Kingdom: Pseudomonadati
- Phylum: Spirochaetota
- Class: Spirochaetia
- Order: Spirochaetales
- Family: Treponemataceae
- Genus: Treponema
- Species: T. lecithinolyticum

Binomial name
- Treponema lecithinolyticum Wyss et al., 1999

Species of bacterium

Treponema lecithinolyticum is a species of Treponema. It is implicated as a pathogen in chronic periodontitis which can induce bone loss. This motile bacillus is a gram negative, facultative anaerobe and a spirochaete.
