= Treponema succinifaciens =

Scientific classification
- Domain: Bacteria
- Kingdom: Pseudomonadati
- Phylum: Spirochaetota
- Class: Spirochaetia
- Order: Spirochaetales
- Family: Treponemataceae
- Genus: Treponema
- Species: T. succinifaciens

Binomial name
- Treponema succinifaciens Cwyk & Canale-Parola 1981

Species of bacterium

Treponema succinifaciens is a species of anaerobic spirochete bacteria first discovered in the intestines of swine in 1981. The helical cells of T. succinifaciens grow to 16 μm in length and often form chains of cells when cultured. T. succinifaciens is gram-negative and non spore-forming.

== In humans ==
Treponema succinifaciens is found in the gut microbiome of many human populations, particularly those living traditional lifestyles. Although they have been found in humans living in urban areas, the occurrence is much rarer. The rarer occurrence in urban populations is likely due to increased antibiotic use in urban populations

== Genome ==
The genome of T. succinifaciens is 2,897,425 base pairs in length. The bacterium contains 2,723 protein-coding as well as 63 RNA genes. It also contains 63 genes that are involved in motility.
