= Treponema isoptericolens =

Scientific classification
- Domain: Bacteria
- Kingdom: Pseudomonadati
- Phylum: Spirochaetota
- Class: Spirochaetia
- Order: Spirochaetales
- Family: Treponemataceae
- Genus: Treponema
- Species: T. isoptericolens

Binomial name
- Treponema isoptericolens Dröge et al. 2008

Species of bacterium

Treponema isoptericolens is a spirochaete from the hindgut of the termite Incisitermes tabogae. Its cells are motile, helical in shape, 0.4–0.5 μm in diameter and generally 12–20 μm long; it is obligately anaerobic, with type strain SPIT5^{T} (=DSM 18056^{T} =JCM 13955^{T}).
