= TD-1 RNA motif =

TD-1
- Consensus secondary structure and sequence conservation of TD-1 RNA

Identifiers
- Symbol: TD-1
- Rfam: RF03155

Other data
- RNA type: Cis-reg
- SO: SO:0000655
- PDB structures: PDBe

The TD-1 RNA motif is a conserved RNA structure found only in the species Treponema denticola, at least among bacteria whose genomes were sequenced in 2007 when the RNA motif was identified. The T. denticola genome contains 28 predicted TD-1 RNAs, and all but two of these are positioned such that they are likely to be in the 5' UTR of the downstream gene. This arrangement suggests that TD-1 RNAs likely correspond to cis-regulatory elements. However, due to the variety of genes apparently regulated by TD-1 RNAs, no specific hypothesis as to its function was suggested.

The TD-1 RNA's secondary structure is supported by covariation (see secondary structure prediction), but there are an unusual number of stems containing runs of adenosines that base pair with coordinate runs of uridines.

Seven TD-1 RNAs overlap predicted representatives of the TD-2 RNA motif, but it is unknown whether these two motifs can somehow be merged.
