= Syphilis =

Sexually transmitted infection

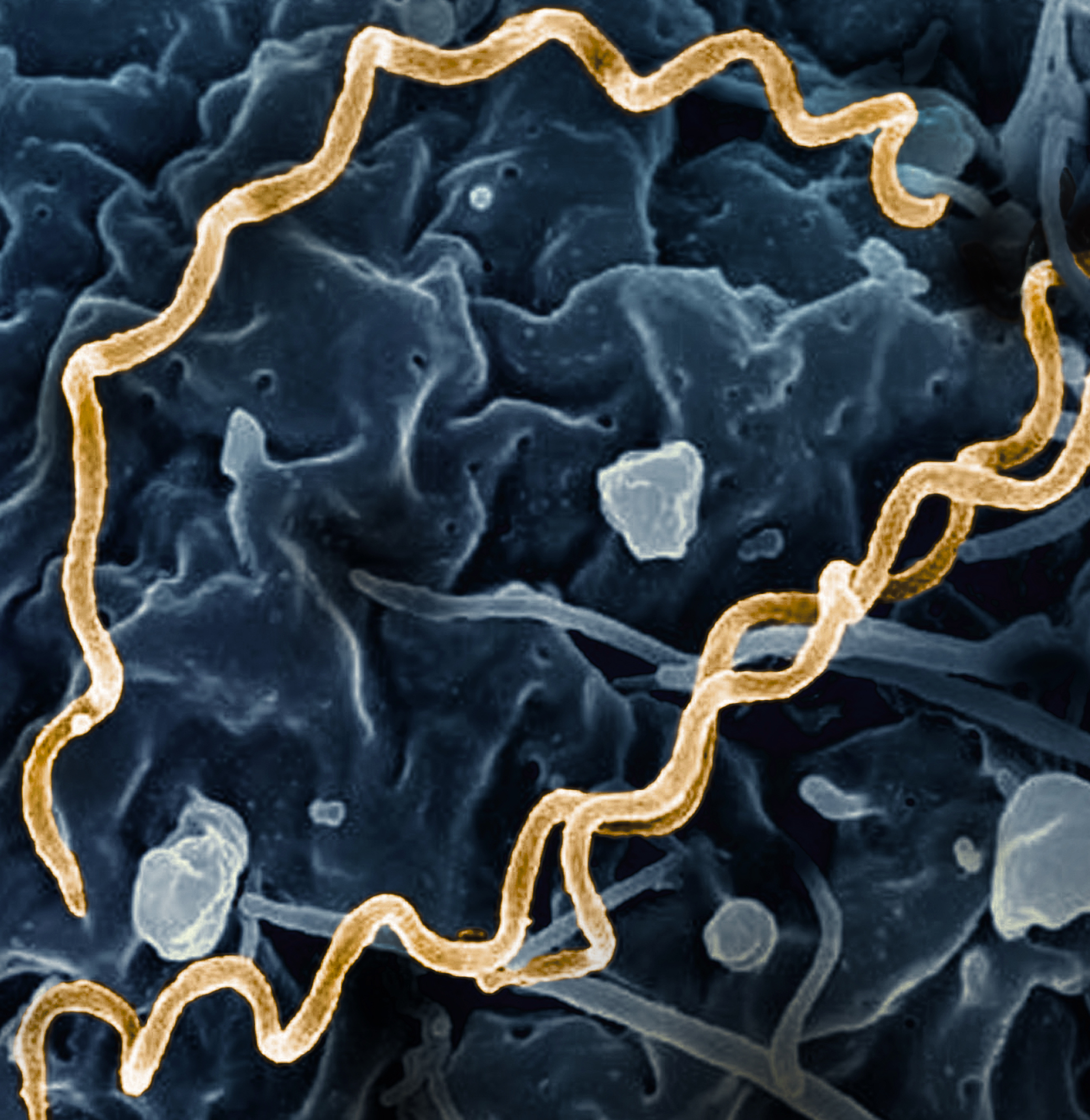
- Colorized electron micrograph of Treponema pallidum bacteria
- Pronunciation: /ˈsɪfəlɪs, ˈsɪfɪlɪs/
- Specialty: Infectious disease
- Symptoms: Firm, painless, non-itchy skin ulcer
- Causes: Treponema pallidum, usually spread by sexual intercourse
- Diagnostic method: Blood tests, dark field microscopy of infected fluid
- Differential diagnosis: Many other diseases
- Prevention: Condoms, not having sex
- Treatment: Antibiotics
- Frequency: 45.4 million / 0.6% (2015, global)
- Deaths: 107,000 (2015, global)

Syphilis is a sexually transmitted infection caused by the bacterium Treponema pallidum subspecies pallidum. Symptoms depend on the stage: primary, secondary, latent or tertiary. The primary stage classically presents with a single chancre (a firm, painless, non-itchy skin ulceration usually between 1 cm and 2 cm in diameter), though there may be multiple sores. In secondary syphilis, a diffuse rash occurs, which frequently involves the palms of the hands and soles of the feet. There may also be sores in the mouth or vagina. Latent syphilis has no symptoms and can last years. In tertiary syphilis, there are gummas (soft, non-cancerous growths), neurological problems, or heart symptoms. Syphilis has been known as "the great imitator", because it may cause symptoms similar to many other diseases.

It is most commonly spread through sexual activity. It may also be transmitted from mother to baby during pregnancy or at birth, resulting in congenital syphilis. Other diseases caused by Treponema bacteria include yaws (T. pallidum subspecies pertenue), pinta (T. carateum), and nonvenereal endemic syphilis (T. pallidum subspecies endemicum). These three diseases are not typically sexually transmitted. Diagnosis is usually made by using blood tests; the bacteria can also be detected using dark field microscopy. The Centers for Disease Control and Prevention (U.S.) recommends for all pregnant women to be tested.

The risk of sexual spread can be reduced by using a latex or polyurethane condom. Syphilis can be effectively treated with antibiotics. The preferred antibiotic for most cases is benzathine benzylpenicillin injected into a muscle. In those who have a severe penicillin allergy, doxycycline or tetracycline may be used. In those with neurosyphilis, intravenous benzylpenicillin or ceftriaxone is recommended. During treatment, people may develop fever, headache, and muscle pains, known as a Jarisch–Herxheimer reaction.

In 2015, about 45.4 million people had syphilis infections, of which six million were new cases. During 2015, it caused about 107,000 deaths, down from 202,000 in 1990. After decreasing dramatically with the availability of penicillin in the 1940s, rates of infection have increased since the turn of the millennium in many countries, often in combination with human immunodeficiency virus (HIV). This is believed to be partly due to unsafe drug use, increased prostitution, and decreased use of condoms.

== Signs and symptoms ==
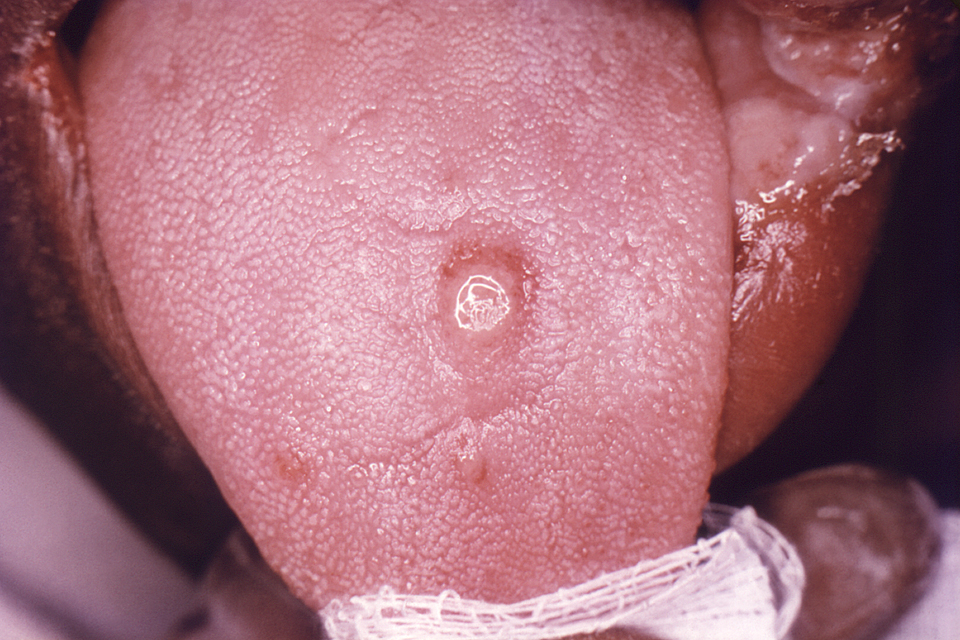
Primary syphilis on a tongue

Syphilis can present in one of four different stages: primary, secondary, latent, and tertiary, and may also occur congenitally. There may be no symptoms. It was referred to as "the great imitator" by Sir William Osler due to its varied presentations.

=== Primary ===
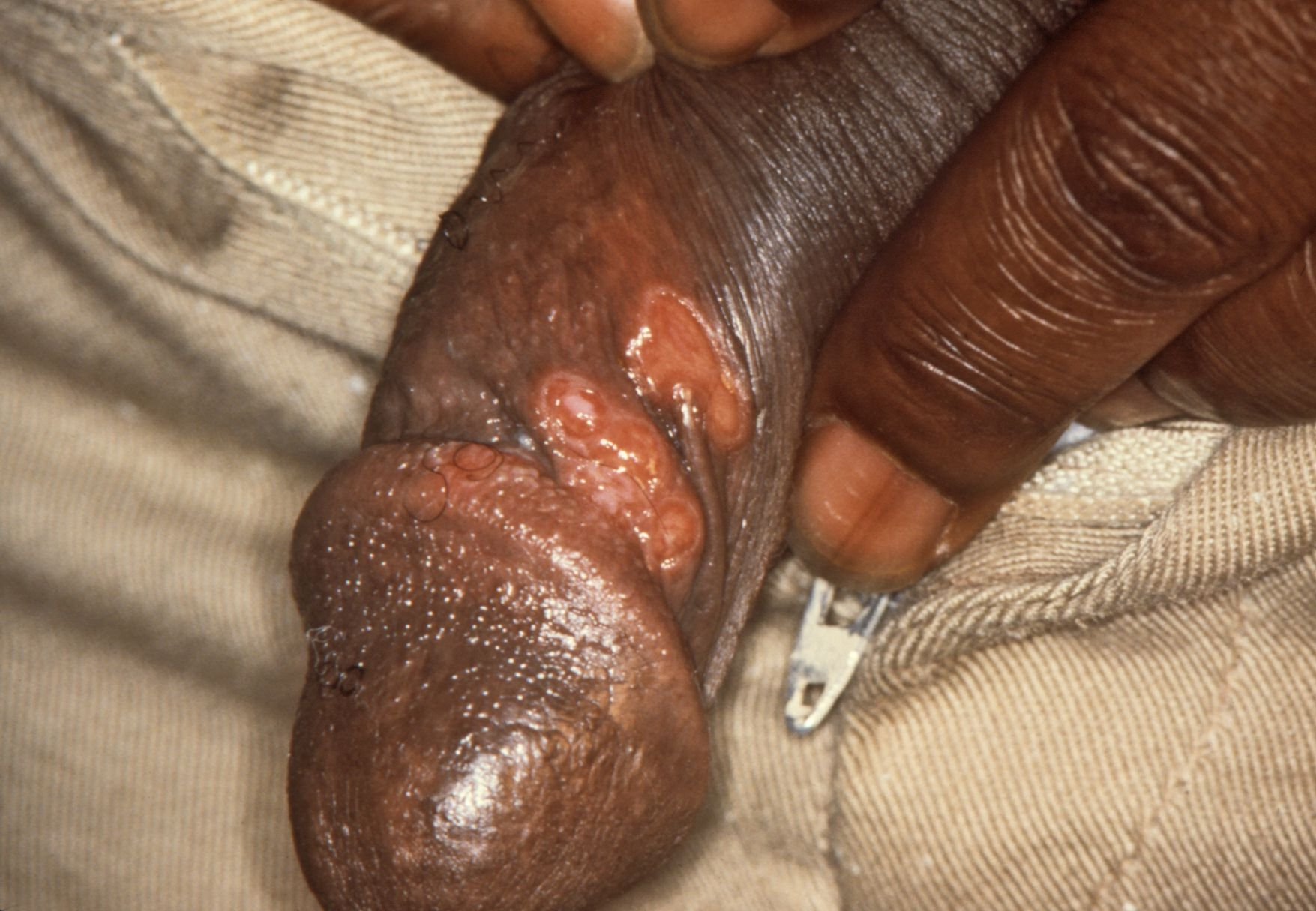
A chancre on a penis due to primary syphilis, 1978

Primary syphilis is typically acquired by direct sexual contact with the infectious lesions of another person. Approximately 2–6 weeks after contact (with a range of 10–90 days) a skin lesion, called a chancre, appears at the site and this contains infectious bacteria. This is classically (40% of the time) a single, firm, painless, non-itchy skin ulceration with a clean base and sharp borders approximately 0.3–3.0 cm in size. The lesion may take on almost any form. In the classic form, it evolves from a macule to a papule and finally to an erosion or ulcer.

Occasionally, multiple lesions may be present (~40%), with multiple lesions being more common when coinfected with HIV. Lesions may be painful or tender (30%), and they may occur in places other than the genitals (2–7%). The most common location in women is the cervix (44%), the penis in heterosexual men (99%), and anally and rectally in men who have sex with men (34%). Lymph node enlargement frequently (80%) occurs around the area of infection, occurring seven to 10 days after chancre formation. The lesion may persist for three to six weeks if left untreated.

=== Secondary ===
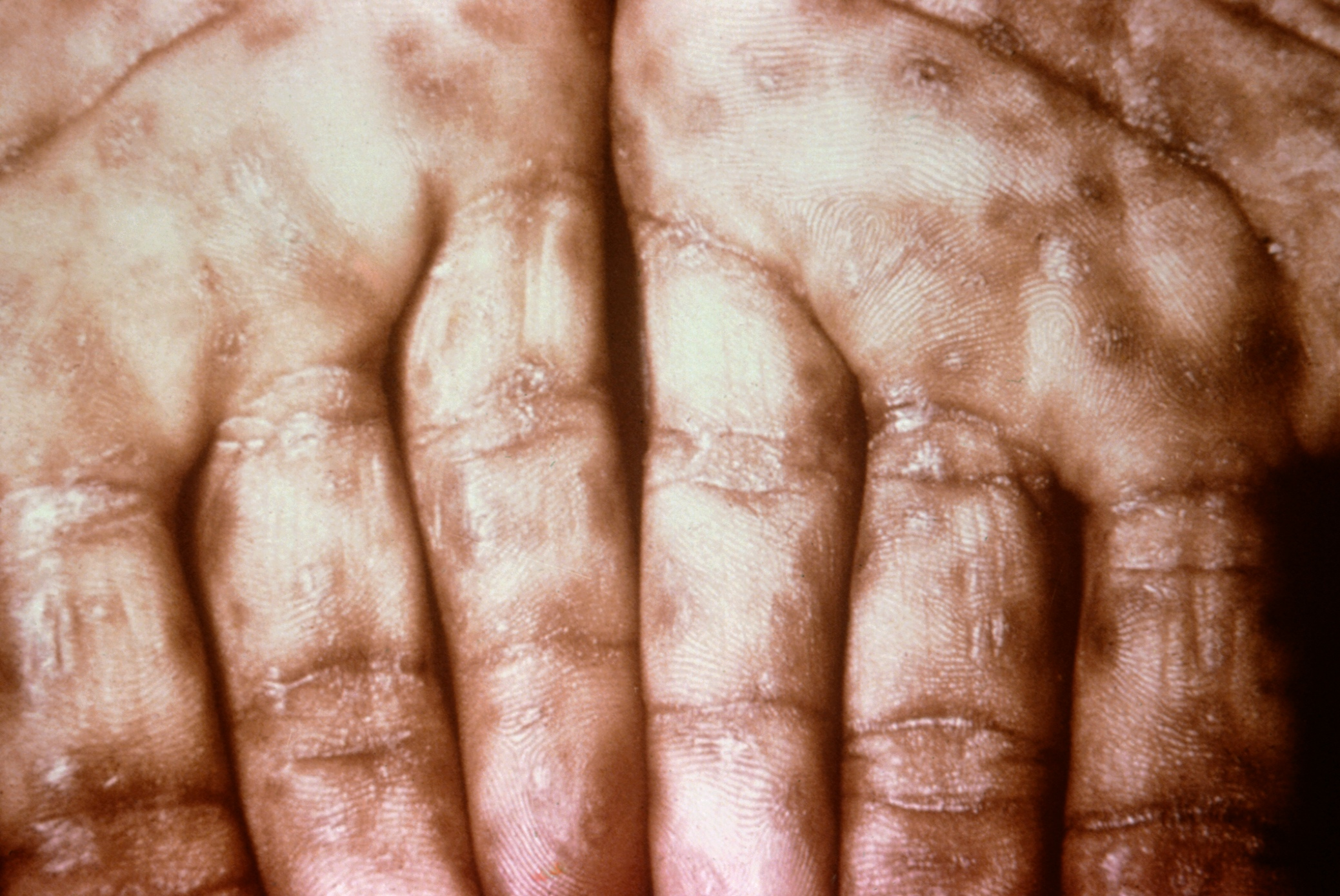
Typical presentation of secondary syphilis with a rash on the palms of the hands, 1967

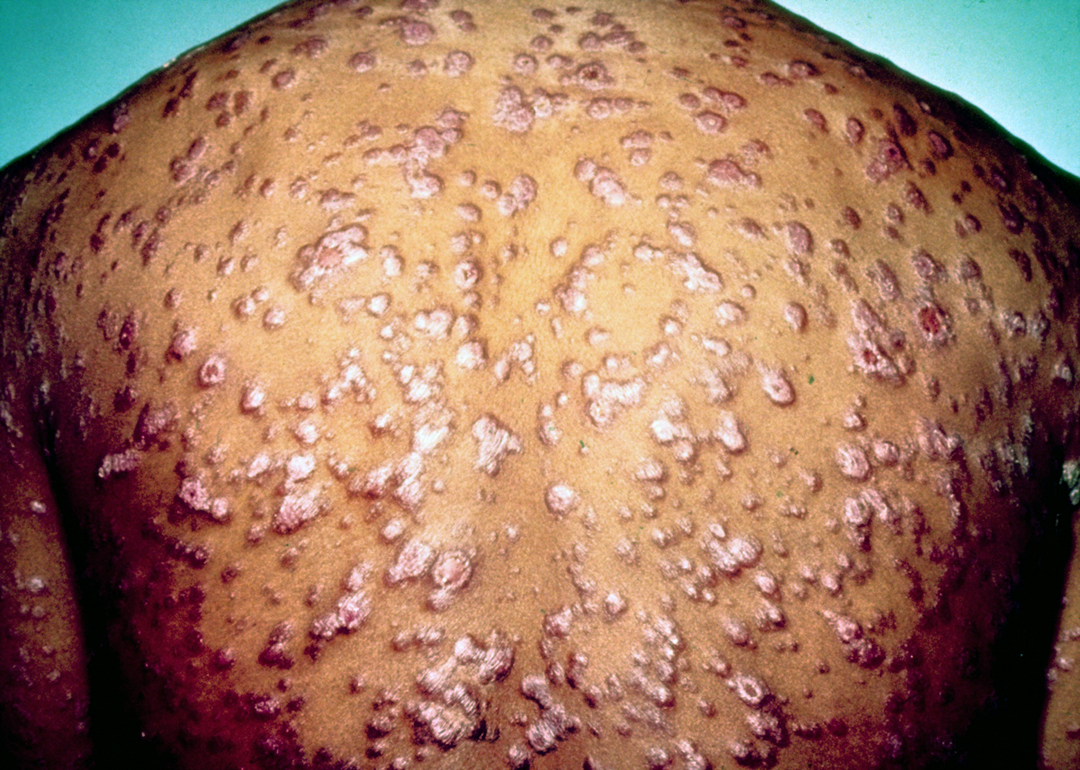
Reddish papules and nodules over much of the body due to secondary syphilis

Secondary syphilis occurs approximately four to ten weeks after the primary infection. While secondary disease is known for the many different ways it can manifest, symptoms most commonly involve the skin, mucous membranes, and lymph nodes. There may be a symmetrical, reddish-pink, non-itchy rash on the trunk and extremities, including the palms and soles. The rash may become maculopapular or pustular. It may form flat, broad, whitish, wart-like lesions on mucous membranes, known as condyloma latum. All of these lesions harbor bacteria and are infectious.

Other symptoms may include fever, sore throat, malaise, weight loss, hair loss, and headache. Rare manifestations include liver inflammation, kidney disease, joint inflammation, periostitis, inflammation of the optic nerve, uveitis, and interstitial keratitis. The acute symptoms usually resolve after three to six weeks; about 25% of people may present with a recurrence of secondary symptoms. Many people who present with secondary syphilis (40–85% of women, 20–65% of men) do not report previously having had the classical chancre of primary syphilis.

=== Latent ===
Latent syphilis is defined as having serologic proof of infection without symptoms of disease. It develops after secondary syphilis and is divided into early latent and late latent stages. Early latent syphilis is defined by the World Health Organization as less than 2 years after original infection. Early latent syphilis is infectious as up to 25% of people can develop a recurrent secondary infection (during which bacteria are actively replicating and are infectious). Two years after the original infection the person will enter late latent syphilis and is not as infectious as in the early phase. The latent phase of syphilis can last many years after which, without treatment, approximately 15–40% of people can develop tertiary syphilis.

=== Tertiary ===
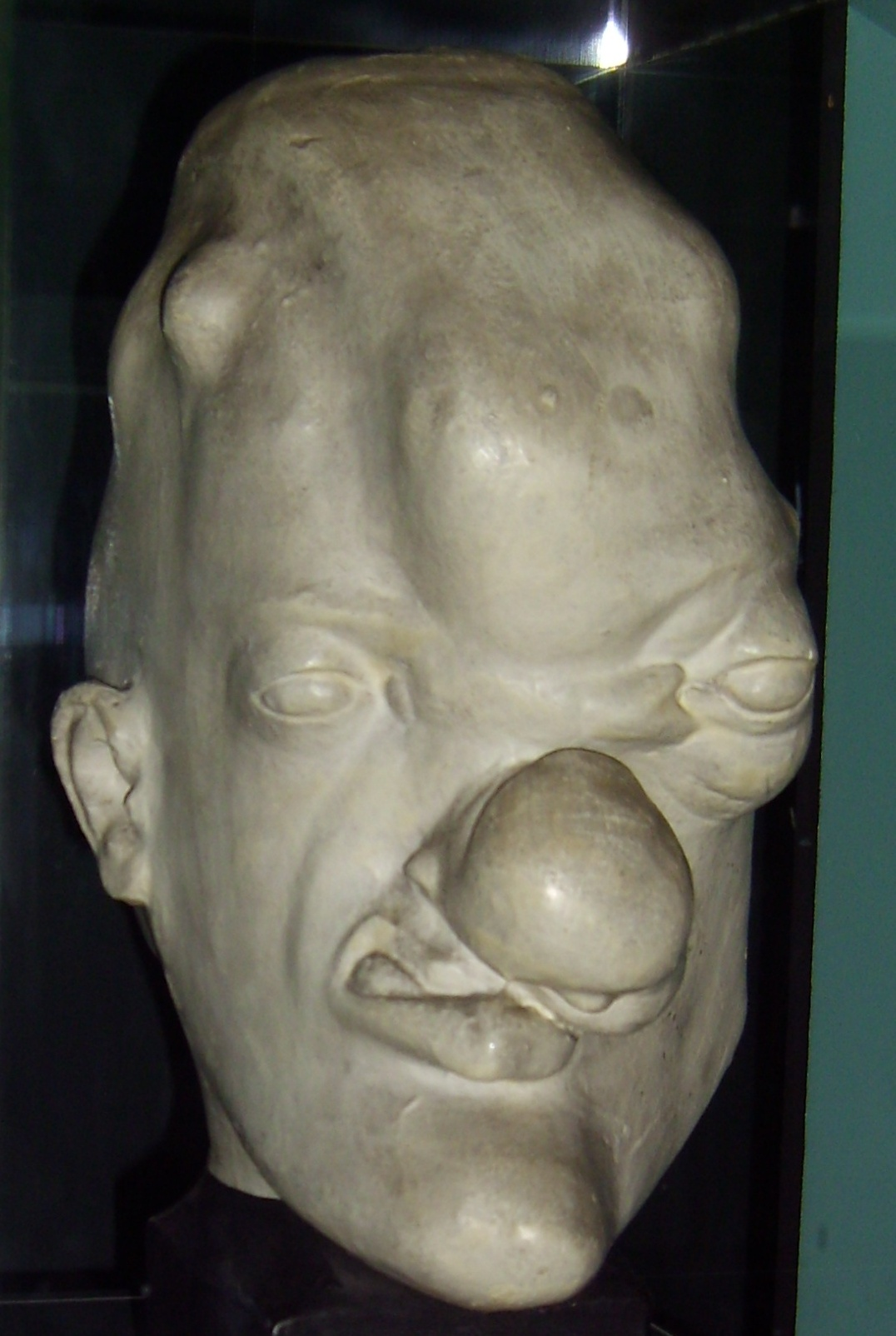
A model of a head of a person with tertiary (gummatous) syphilis, Musée de l'Homme, Paris

Tertiary syphilis may occur approximately 3 to 15 years after the initial infection and may be divided into three different forms: gummatous syphilis (15%), late neurosyphilis (6.5%), and cardiovascular syphilis (10%). Without treatment, a third of infected people develop tertiary disease. People with tertiary syphilis are not infectious.

Gummatous syphilis or late benign syphilis usually occurs 1 to 46 years after the initial infection, with an average of 15 years. This stage is characterized by the formation of chronic gummas, which are soft, tumor-like balls of inflammation which may vary considerably in size. They typically affect the skin, bone, and liver, but can occur anywhere.

Cardiovascular syphilis usually occurs 10–30 years after the initial infection. The most common complication is syphilitic aortitis, which may result in aortic aneurysm formation.

Neurosyphilis refers to an infection involving the central nervous system. Involvement of the central nervous system in syphilis (either asymptomatic or symptomatic) can occur at any stage of the infection. It may occur early, being either asymptomatic or in the form of syphilitic meningitis; or late as meningovascular syphilis, manifesting as general paresis or tabes dorsalis.

Meningovascular syphilis involves inflammation of the small and medium arteries of the central nervous system. It can present between 1–10 years after the initial infection. Meningovascular syphilis is characterized by stroke, cranial nerve palsies and spinal cord inflammation. Late symptomatic neurosyphilis can develop decades after the original infection and includes 2 types; general paresis and tabes dorsalis. General paresis presents with dementia, personality changes, delusions, seizures, psychosis and depression.

Tabes dorsalis is characterized by gait instability, sharp pains in the trunk and limbs, impaired positional sensation of the limbs as well as having a positive Romberg's sign. Both tabes dorsalis and general paresis may present with Argyll Robertson pupil which are pupils that constrict when the person focuses on near objects (accommodation reflex) but do not constrict when exposed to bright light (pupillary reflex).

=== Congenital ===
Congenital syphilis is that which is transmitted during pregnancy or during birth. Two-thirds of syphilitic infants are born without symptoms. Common symptoms that develop over the first couple of years of life include enlargement of the liver and spleen (70%), rash (70%), fever (40%), neurosyphilis (20%), and lung inflammation (20%). If untreated, late congenital syphilis may occur in 40%, including saddle nose deformation, Higouménakis' sign, saber shin, or Clutton's joints among others. Infection during pregnancy is also associated with miscarriage. The main dental defects seen in congenital syphilis are the peg-shaped, notched incisors known as Hutchinson's teeth and so-called mulberry molars (also known as Moon or Fournier molars), defective permanent molars with rounded, deformed crowns resembling a mulberry.

== Cause ==
=== Bacteriology ===
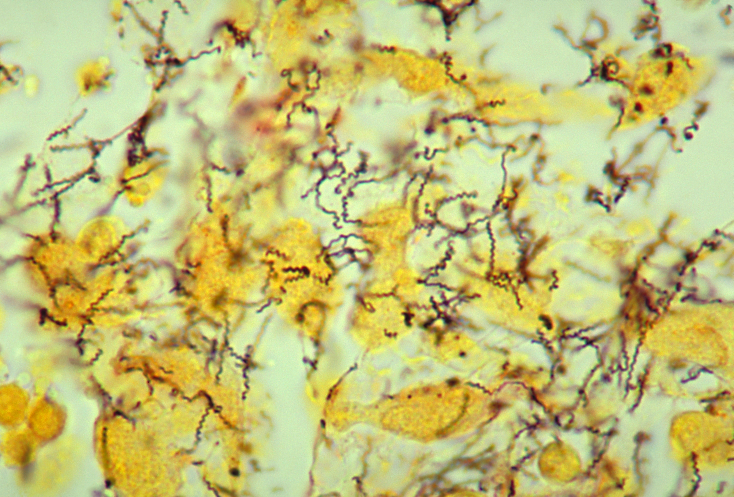
Histopathology of Treponema pallidum bacteria using a modified Steiner silver stain, 1986

Treponema pallidum subspecies pallidum is a spiral-shaped, Gram-negative, highly mobile bacterium. Two other human diseases are caused by related Treponema pallidum subspecies, yaws (subspecies pertenue) and bejel (subspecies endemicum), and one further caused by the very closely related Treponema carateum, pinta. Unlike subspecies pallidum, they do not cause neurological disease. Humans are the only known natural reservoir for subspecies pallidum. It is unable to survive more than a few days without a host. This is due to its small genome (1.14 Mbp) failing to encode the metabolic pathways necessary to make most of its macronutrients. It has a slow doubling time of greater than 30 hours. The bacterium is known for its ability to evade the immune system and its invasiveness.

=== Transmission ===
Syphilis is transmitted primarily by sexual contact or during pregnancy from a mother to her baby; the bacterium is able to pass through intact mucous membranes or compromised skin. It is thus transmissible by kissing near a lesion, as well as manual, oral, vaginal, and anal sex. Approximately 30% to 60% of those exposed to primary or secondary syphilis will get the disease. Its infectivity is exemplified by the fact that an individual inoculated with only 57 organisms has a 50% chance of being infected. Most new cases in the United States (60%) occur in men who have sex with men; and in this population 20% of syphilis cases were due to oral sex alone. Syphilis can be transmitted by blood products, but the risk is low due to screening of donated blood in many countries. The risk of transmission from sharing needles appears to be limited.

It is not generally possible to contract syphilis through toilet seats, daily activities, hot tubs, or sharing eating utensils or clothing. This is mainly because the bacteria die very quickly outside of the body, making transmission by objects extremely difficult.

== Diagnosis ==
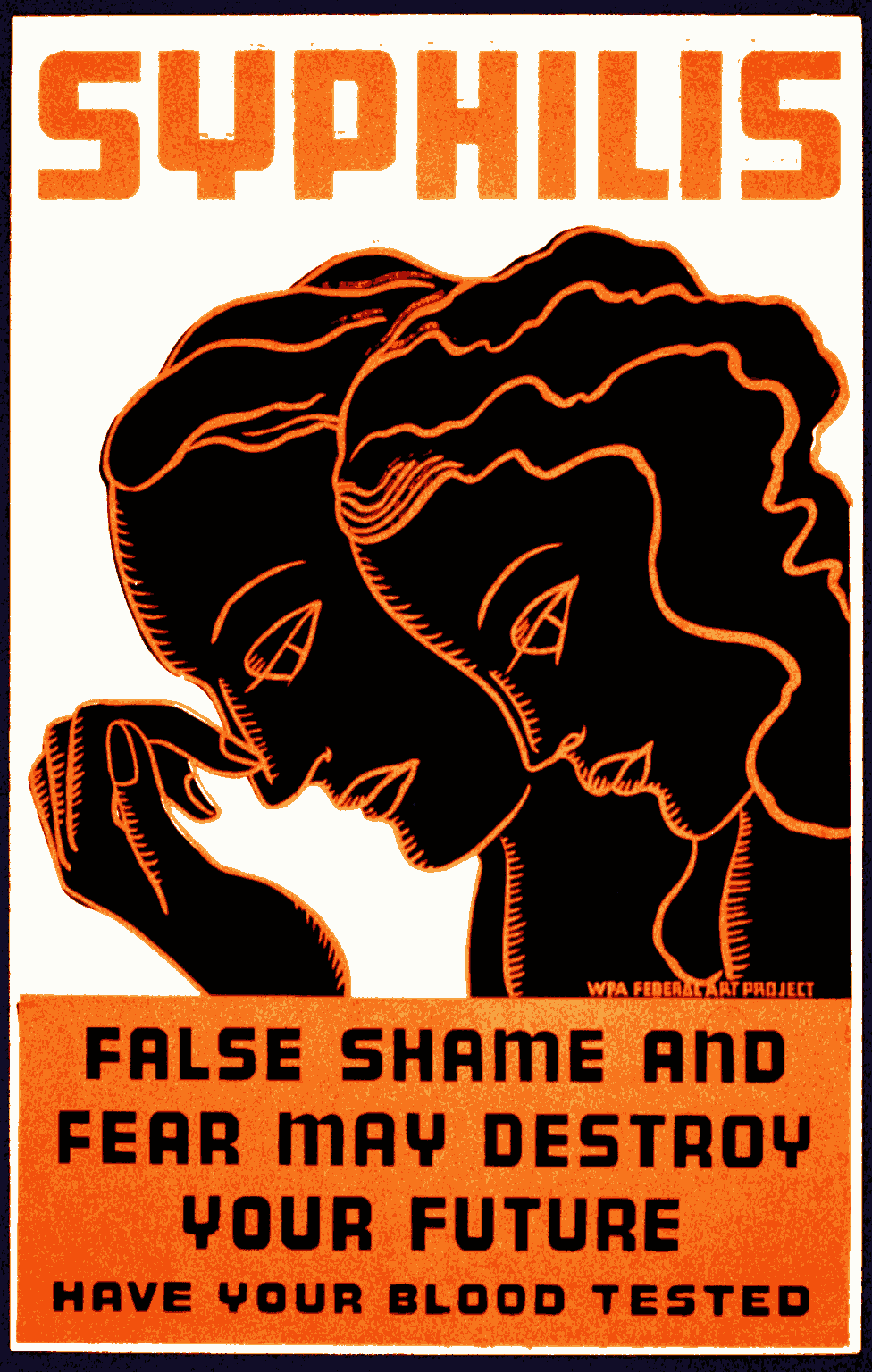
This Works Progress Administration poster (c. 1936) acknowledges the social stigma of syphilis, while urging those who possibly have the disease to be tested

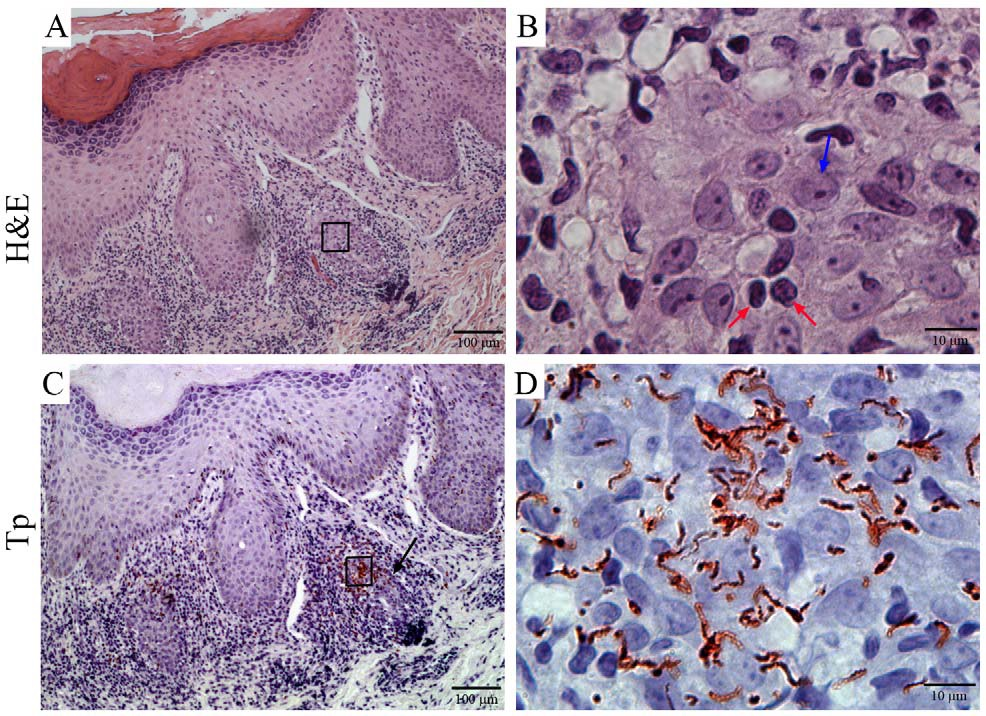
A micrograph of secondary syphilis skin lesions. (A/B) H&E stain of SS lesions. (C/D) IHC staining reveals abundant bacteria embedded within a mixed cellular inflammatory infiltrate (shown in the red box) in the papillary dermis. The blue arrow points to a tissue histiocyte and the red arrows to two dermal lymphocytes

Syphilis is difficult to diagnose clinically during early infection. Confirmation is either via blood tests or direct visual inspection using dark field microscopy. Blood tests are more commonly used, as they are easier to perform. Diagnostic tests are unable to distinguish between the stages of the disease.

=== Blood tests ===
Syphilis can be diagnosed by serology, including the nontreponemal rapid plasma reagin (RPR) test and treponemal antibody tests (such as TPPA). Total antibody (IgG and IgM) to treponemal antigens is used as a screening test, which is performed by enzyme immunoassay (EIA). When the screening test is positive, the result is evaluated with an RPR test (and confirmed with TPPA if the RPR is negative). The TPPA is often positive for life, whereas the RPR level increases or decreases depending on the progression of disease or the success of treatment. Treponemal antibodies are not protective. Reinfections are shown by an increase in RPR levels. RPR levels usually drop and often become negative after treatment, but in some people it stays reactive at a low, stable level. These tests can occasionally yield false negatives in the very early days of a primary chancre before the body mounts a detectable antibody response. Neurosyphilis is diagnosed by finding high numbers of leukocytes (predominately lymphocytes) and high protein levels in the cerebrospinal fluid in the setting of a known syphilis infection, through a combination of clinical evaluation, serological blood tests, and cerebrospinal fluid (CSF) analysis via a lumbar puncture.

=== Direct testing ===
Dark field microscopy of serous fluid from a chancre may be used to make an immediate diagnosis. Hospitals do not always have equipment or experienced staff members, and testing must be done within 10 minutes of acquiring the sample. Two other tests can be carried out on a sample from the chancre: direct fluorescent antibody (DFA) and polymerase chain reaction (PCR) tests. DFA uses antibodies tagged with fluorescein, which attach to specific syphilis proteins, while PCR uses techniques to detect the presence of specific syphilis genes. These tests are not as time-sensitive, as they do not require living bacteria to make the diagnosis.

== Prevention ==
=== Vaccine ===
As of 2018, there was no vaccine effective for prevention. Several vaccines based on treponemal proteins reduce lesion development in an animal model but research continues.

=== Sex ===
Condom use reduces the likelihood of transmission during sex, but does not eliminate the risk. The Centers for Disease Control and Prevention (CDC) states, "Correct and consistent use of latex condoms can reduce the risk of syphilis only when the infected area or site of potential exposure is protected. However, a syphilis sore outside of the area covered by a latex condom can still allow transmission, so caution should be exercised even when using a condom."

Abstinence from intimate physical contact with an infected person is effective at reducing the transmission of syphilis. The CDC states, "The surest way to avoid transmission of sexually transmitted diseases, including syphilis, is to abstain from sexual contact or to be in a long-term mutually monogamous relationship with a partner who has been tested and is known to be uninfected."

=== Congenital disease ===
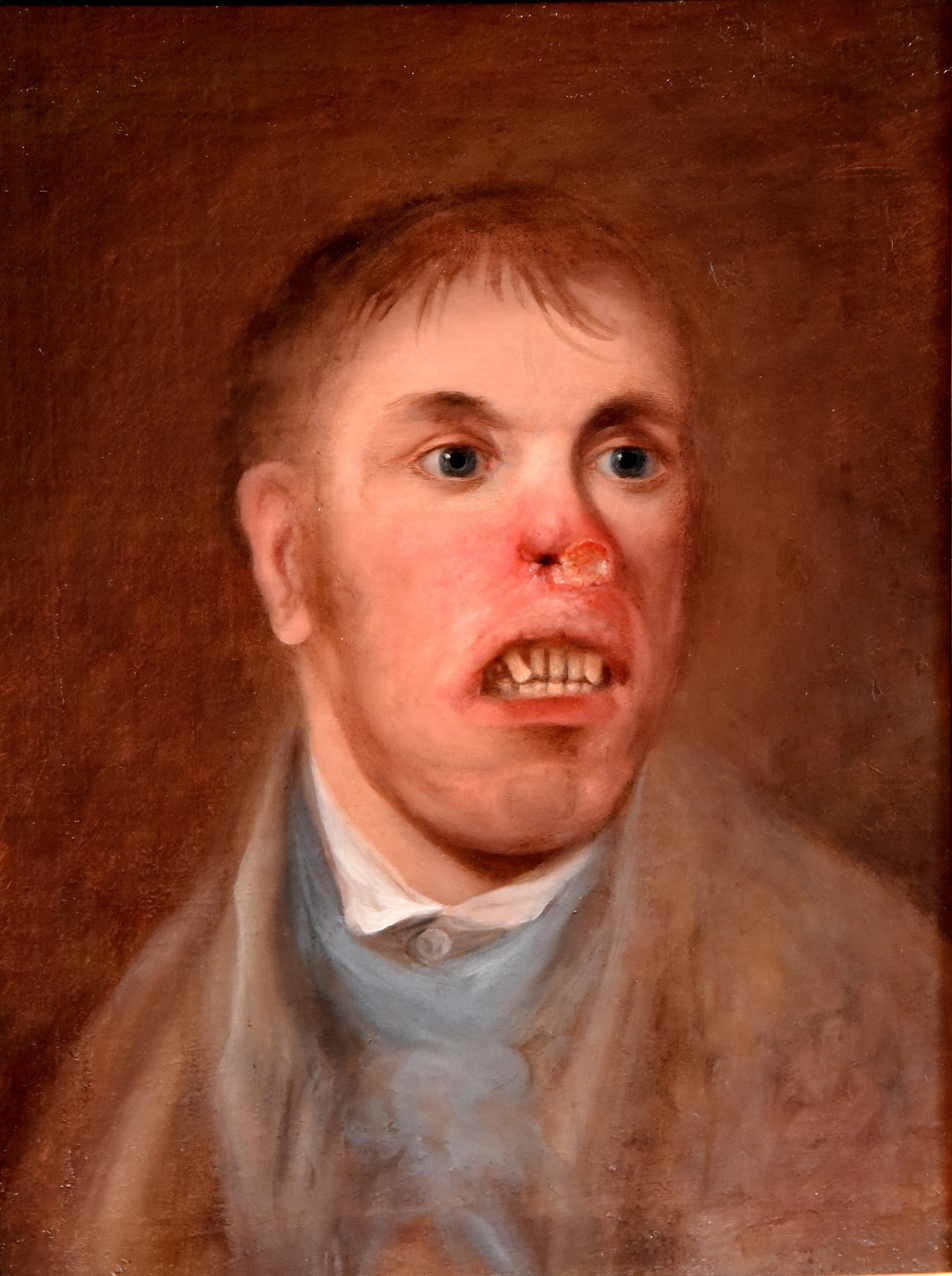
A portrait of a man affected with what is believed to have been congenital syphilis, c. 1820

Congenital syphilis in the newborn can be prevented by screening mothers during early pregnancy and treating those who are infected. The United States Preventive Services Task Force (USPSTF) strongly recommends universal screening of all pregnant women, while the World Health Organization (WHO) recommends all women be tested at their first antenatal visit and again in the third trimester. If they are positive, it is recommended their partners also be treated.

Congenital syphilis is still common in the developing world, as many women do not receive antenatal care at all, and the antenatal care others receive does not include screening. It still occasionally occurs in the developed world, as those most likely to acquire syphilis are least likely to receive care during pregnancy. Several measures to increase access to testing appear effective at reducing rates of congenital syphilis in low- to middle-income countries. Point-of-care testing to detect syphilis appeared to be reliable, although more research is needed to assess its effectiveness and into improving outcomes in mothers and babies.

=== Screening ===
The CDC recommends that sexually active men who have sex with men be tested at least yearly. The USPSTF also recommends screening among those at high risk.

Syphilis is a notifiable disease in many countries, including Canada, the European Union, and the United States. This means health care providers are required to notify public health authorities, which will then ideally provide partner notification to the person's partners. Physicians may also encourage patients to send their partners to seek care. Several strategies have been found to improve follow-up for STI testing, including email and text messaging of reminders for appointments.

== Treatment ==
=== Early infections ===
The first-line treatment for uncomplicated syphilis (primary or secondary stages) remains a single dose of intramuscular benzathine benzylpenicillin. The bacterium is highly vulnerable to penicillin when treated early, and a treated individual is typically rendered non-infective in about 24 hours. Doxycycline and tetracycline are alternative choices for those allergic to penicillin; due to the risk of birth defects, these are not recommended for pregnant women. Resistance to macrolides, rifampicin, and clindamycin is often present.

Ceftriaxone, a third-generation cephalosporin antibiotic, may be as effective as penicillin-based treatment. It is recommended that a treated person avoid sex until the sores are healed. In comparison to azithromycin for treatment in early infection, there is lack of strong evidence for superiority of azithromycin to benzathine penicillin G.

=== Late infections ===
For neurosyphilis, due to the poor penetration of benzathine penicillin into the central nervous system, those affected are given large doses of intravenous penicillin G for a minimum of 10 days. If a person is allergic to penicillin, ceftriaxone may be used or penicillin desensitization attempted. Other late presentations may be treated with once-weekly intramuscular benzathine penicillin for three weeks. Treatment at this stage solely limits further progression of the disease and has a limited effect on damage which has already occurred. Serologic cure can be measured when the non-treponemal titers decline by a factor of 4 or more in 6–12 months in early syphilis or 12–24 months in late syphilis.

=== Jarisch–Herxheimer reaction ===
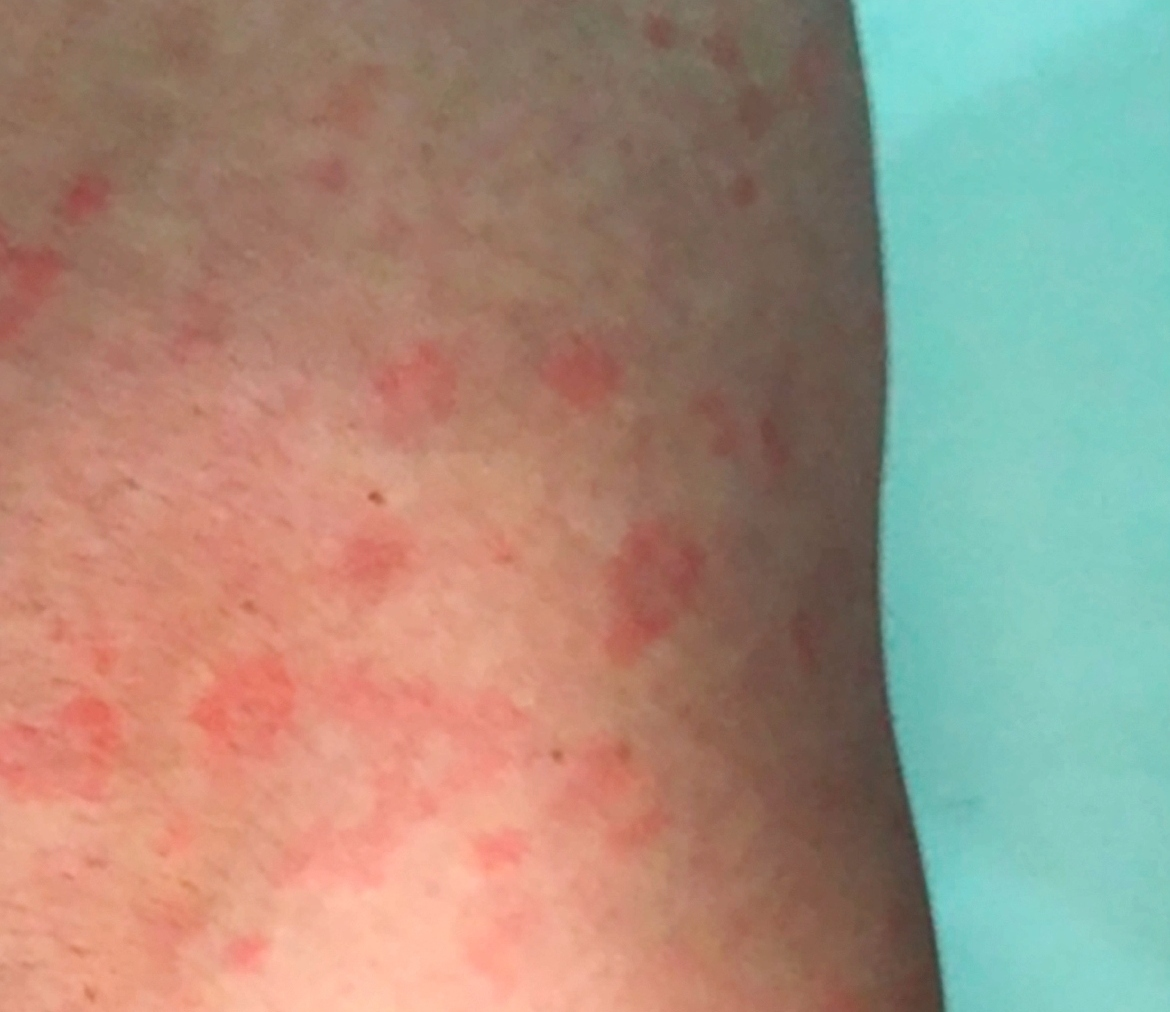
Jarisch–Herxheimer reaction in a person with syphilis and human immunodeficiency virus

One of the potential side effects of treatment is the Jarisch–Herxheimer reaction. It frequently starts within one hour and lasts for 24 hours, with symptoms of fever, muscle pains, headache, and a fast heart rate. It results from the release of pro-inflammatory cytokines by the immune system in response to lipoproteins released from rupturing syphilis bacteria.

=== Pregnancy ===
Penicillin is an effective treatment for syphilis in pregnancy but there is no agreement on which dose or route of delivery is most effective.

== Epidemiology ==
Deaths from syphilis by age

Syphilis deaths per million persons in 2012 0–0 1–1 2–3 4–10 11–19 20–28 29–57 58–138

In 2012, about 0.5% of adults were infected with syphilis, with 6 million new cases. In 1999, it is believed to have infected 12 million additional people, with greater than 90% of cases in the developing world. It affects between 700,000 and 1.6 million pregnancies a year, resulting in miscarriages, stillbirths, and congenital syphilis. During 2015, it caused about 107,000 deaths, down from 202,000 in 1990.

In sub-Saharan Africa, syphilis contributes to approximately 20% of perinatal deaths. Rates are proportionally higher among intravenous drug users, those who are infected with HIV, and men who have sex with men. In the United States about 55,400 people are newly infected each year as of 2014. African Americans accounted for almost half of all cases in 2010. As of 2014, syphilis infections continue to increase in the United States.

In the United States as of 2020, rates of syphilis have increased by more than threefold; in 2018 approximately 86% of all cases of syphilis in the United States were in men. In 2021, preliminary CDC data illustrated that 2,677 cases of congenital syphilis were found in the population of 332 million in the United States.

Syphilis was very common in Europe during the 18th and 19th centuries. Flaubert found it universal among 19th-century Egyptian prostitutes. In the developed world during the early 20th century, infections declined rapidly with the widespread use of antibiotics, until the 1980s and 1990s. Since 2000, rates of syphilis have been increasing in the US, Canada, the UK, Australia and Europe, primarily among men who have sex with men.

Rates of syphilis among US women have remained stable during this time, while rates among UK women have increased, but at a rate less than that of men. Increased rates among heterosexuals have occurred in China and Russia since the 1990s. This has been attributed to unsafe sexual practices, such as sexual promiscuity, prostitution, and decreasing use of barrier protection.

Left untreated, it has a mortality rate of 8% to 58%, with a greater death rate among males. The symptoms of syphilis have become less severe over the 19th and 20th centuries, in part due to widespread availability of effective treatment, and partly due to virulence of the bacteria. With early treatment, few complications result. Syphilis increases the risk of HIV transmission by two to five times, and coinfection is common (30–60% in some urban centers). In 2015, Cuba became the first country to eliminate mother-to-child transmission of syphilis.

== History ==
=== Origin, spread and discovery ===
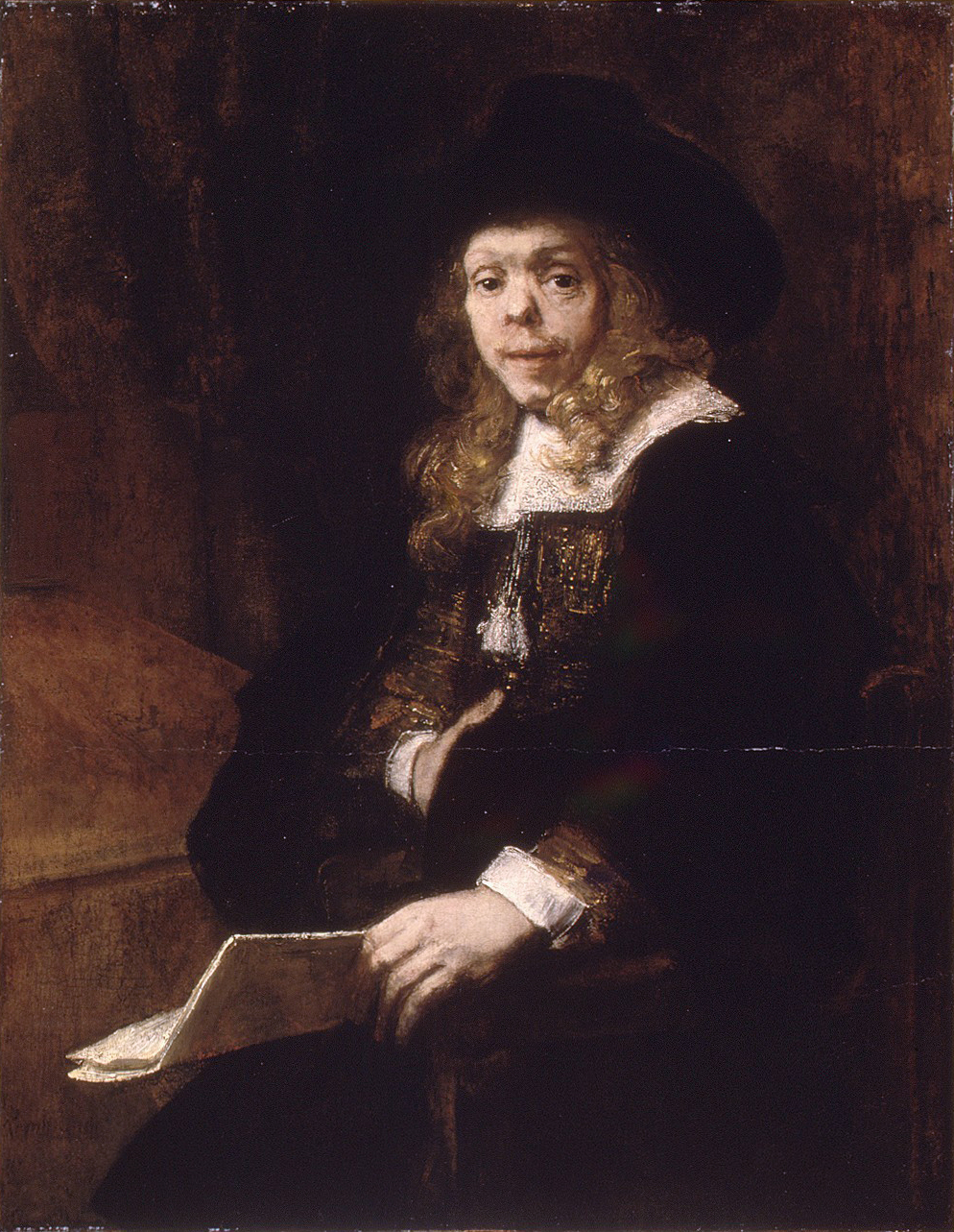
Portrait of Gerard de Lairesse by Rembrandt van Rijn, circa 1665–67, oil on canvas. De Lairesse, himself a painter and art theorist, had congenital syphilis that deformed his face and eventually blinded him

Paleopathologists have known for decades that syphilis was present in the Americas before European contact. The situation in Afro-Eurasia has been murkier and caused considerable debate. According to the Columbian theory, syphilis was brought to Spain by the men who sailed with Christopher Columbus in 1492 and spread from there, with a serious epidemic in Naples beginning as early as 1495. Contemporaries believed the disease sprang from American roots, and in the 16th century physicians wrote extensively about the new disease inflicted on them by the returning explorers.

Most evidence supports the Columbian origin hypothesis. However, beginning in the 1960s, examples of probable treponematosis—the parent disease of syphilis, bejel, and yaws—in skeletal remains shifted the opinion of some towards a "pre-Columbian" origin. A 2024 study published in Nature supported syphilis having first emerged among humans in the Americas in the mid-Holocene.

When living conditions changed with urbanization, elite social groups began to practice basic hygiene and started to separate themselves from other social tiers. Consequently, treponematosis was driven out of the age group in which it had become endemic. It then began to appear in adults as syphilis. Because they had never been exposed as children, they were not able to fend off serious illness. Spreading the disease via sexual contact also led to victims being infected with a massive bacterial load from open sores on the genitalia. Adults in higher socioeconomic groups then became very sick with painful and debilitating symptoms lasting for decades. Often, they died of the disease, as did their children who were infected with congenital syphilis. The difference between rural and urban populations was first noted by Ellis Herndon Hudson, a clinician who published extensively about the prevalence of treponematosis, including syphilis, in times past. The importance of bacterial load was first noted by the physician Ernest Grin in 1952 in his study of syphilis in Bosnia.

The most compelling evidence for the validity of the pre-Columbian hypothesis is the presence of syphilitic-like damage to bones and teeth in medieval skeletal remains. While the absolute number of cases is not large, new ones are continually discovered, most recently in 2015. At least fifteen cases of acquired treponematosis based on evidence from bones, and six examples of congenital treponematosis based on evidence from teeth, are now widely accepted. In several of the twenty-one cases the evidence may also indicate syphilis.

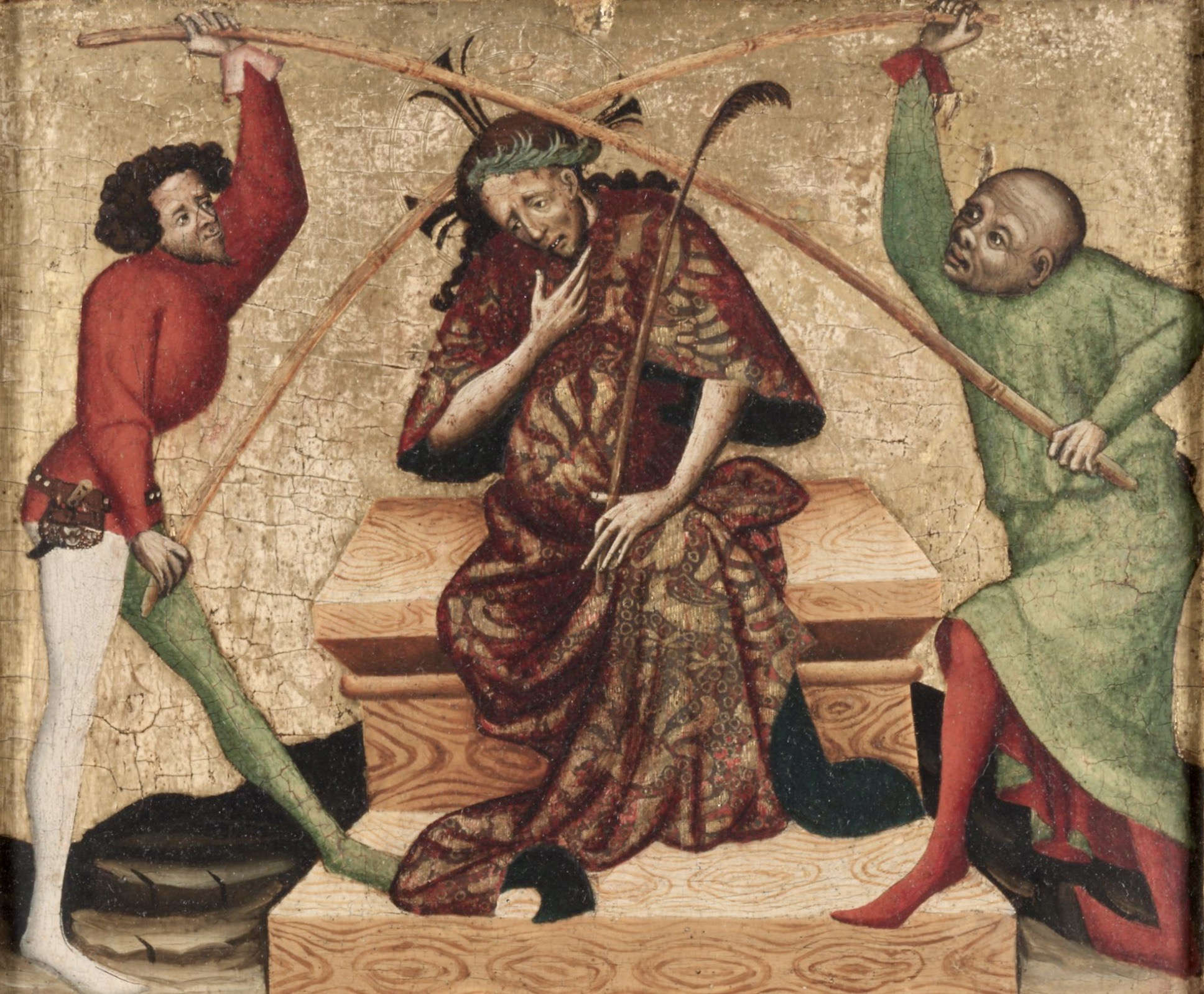
A healthy man and a diseased man torture Christ before his crucifixion. From a French book of hours, c. 1375–1435

In 2020, a group of leading paleopathologists concluded that enough evidence had been collected to prove that treponemal disease, almost certainly including syphilis, had existed in Europe prior to the voyages of Columbus. There is an outstanding issue, however. Damaged teeth and bones may seem to hold proof of pre-Columbian syphilis, but there is a possibility that they point to an endemic form of treponemal disease instead. As syphilis, bejel, and yaws vary considerably in mortality rates and the level of human disease they elicit, it is important to know which one is under discussion in any given case, but it remains difficult for paleopathologists to distinguish among them. The fourth of the treponemal diseases is pinta, a skin disease and therefore unrecoverable through paleopathology. Ancient DNA (aDNA) holds the answer, because just as only aDNA suffices to distinguish between syphilis and other diseases that produce similar symptoms in the body, it alone can differentiate spirochetes that are 99.8 percent identical with absolute accuracy.

Progress on uncovering the historical extent of syndromes through aDNA remains slow, because the bacterium responsible for treponematosis is rare in skeletal remains and fragile, making it notoriously difficult to recover and analyse. Precise dating to the medieval period is not yet possible but work by Kettu Majander et al. uncovering the presence of several different kinds of treponematosis at the beginning of the early modern period argues against its recent introduction from elsewhere. Therefore, they argue, treponematosis—possibly including syphilis—almost certainly existed in medieval Europe.

Despite significant progress in tracing the presence of syphilis in past historic periods, definitive findings from paleopathology and aDNA studies are still lacking for the medieval period. Evidence from art is therefore helpful in settling the issue. Research by Marylynn Salmon has demonstrated that deformities in medieval subjects can be identified by comparing them to those of modern victims of syphilis in medical drawings and photographs. One of the most typical deformities, for example, is a collapsed nasal bridge called saddle nose. Salmon discovered that it appeared often in medieval illuminations, especially among the men tormenting Christ in scenes of the crucifixion. The association of saddle nose with evil is an indication that the artists were thinking of syphilis, which is typically transmitted through sexual intercourse with promiscuous partners, a mortal sin in medieval times.

It remains mysterious why the authors of medieval medical treatises so uniformly refrained from describing syphilis or commenting on its existence in the population. Many may have confused it with other diseases such as leprosy (Hansen's disease) or elephantiasis. The great variety of symptoms of treponematosis, the different ages at which the various diseases appear, and its widely divergent outcomes depending on climate and culture, would have added greatly to the confusion of medical practitioners, as indeed they did right down to the middle of the 20th century. In addition, evidence indicates that some writers on disease feared the political implications of discussing a condition more fatal to elites than to commoners. Historian Jon Arrizabalaga has investigated this question for Castile with startling results revealing an effort to hide its association with elites.

The first written records of an outbreak of syphilis in Europe occurred in 1495 in Naples, Italy, during a French invasion (Italian War of 1494–1495). Since it was claimed to have been spread by French troops, it was initially called the "French disease" by the people of Naples. The disease reached London in 1497 and was recorded at St Bartholomew's Hospital as infecting 10 out of the 20 patients. In 1530, the pastoral name "syphilis" (the name of a character) was first used by the Italian physician and poet Girolamo Fracastoro as the title of his Latin poem in dactylic hexameter, Syphilis sive morbus gallicus (Syphilis or The French Disease), describing the ravages of the disease in Italy. In Great Britain it was also called the "Great Pox".

In the 16th to 19th centuries, syphilis was one of the largest public health burdens in prevalence, symptoms, and disability, although records of its true prevalence were generally not kept because of the fearsome and sordid status of sexually transmitted infections in those centuries. According to a 2020 study, more than 20% of individuals in the age range 15–34 years in late 18th-century London were treated for syphilis. At the time the causative agent was unknown but it was well known that it was spread sexually and also often from mother to child. Its association with sex, especially sexual promiscuity and prostitution, made it an object of fear and revulsion and a taboo.

The magnitude of its morbidity and mortality in those centuries reflected that, unlike today, there was no adequate understanding of its pathogenesis and no truly effective treatments. Its damage was caused not so much by great sickness or death early in the course of the disease but rather by its gruesome effects decades after infection as it progressed to neurosyphilis with tabes dorsalis. Mercury compounds and isolation were commonly used, with treatments often worse than the disease.

The causative organism, Treponema pallidum, was first identified by Fritz Schaudinn and Erich Hoffmann, in 1905. The first effective treatment for syphilis was arsphenamine, discovered by Sahachiro Hata in 1909, during a survey of hundreds of newly synthesized organic arsenical compounds led by Paul Ehrlich. It was manufactured and marketed from 1910 under the trade name Salvarsan by Hoechst AG. This organoarsenic compound was the first modern chemotherapeutic agent.

In the 20th century, as both microbiology and pharmacology advanced greatly, syphilis, like many other infectious diseases, became more of a manageable burden than a scary and disfiguring mystery, at least in developed countries among those people who could afford to pay for timely diagnosis and treatment. Penicillin was discovered in 1928, and effectiveness of treatment with penicillin was confirmed in trials in 1943, at which time it became the main treatment.

Many famous historical figures, including Franz Schubert, Arthur Schopenhauer, Édouard Manet, Charles Baudelaire, and Guy de Maupassant are believed to have had the disease. Friedrich Nietzsche was long believed to have gone mad as a result of tertiary syphilis, but that diagnosis has recently come into question.

=== Arts and literature ===
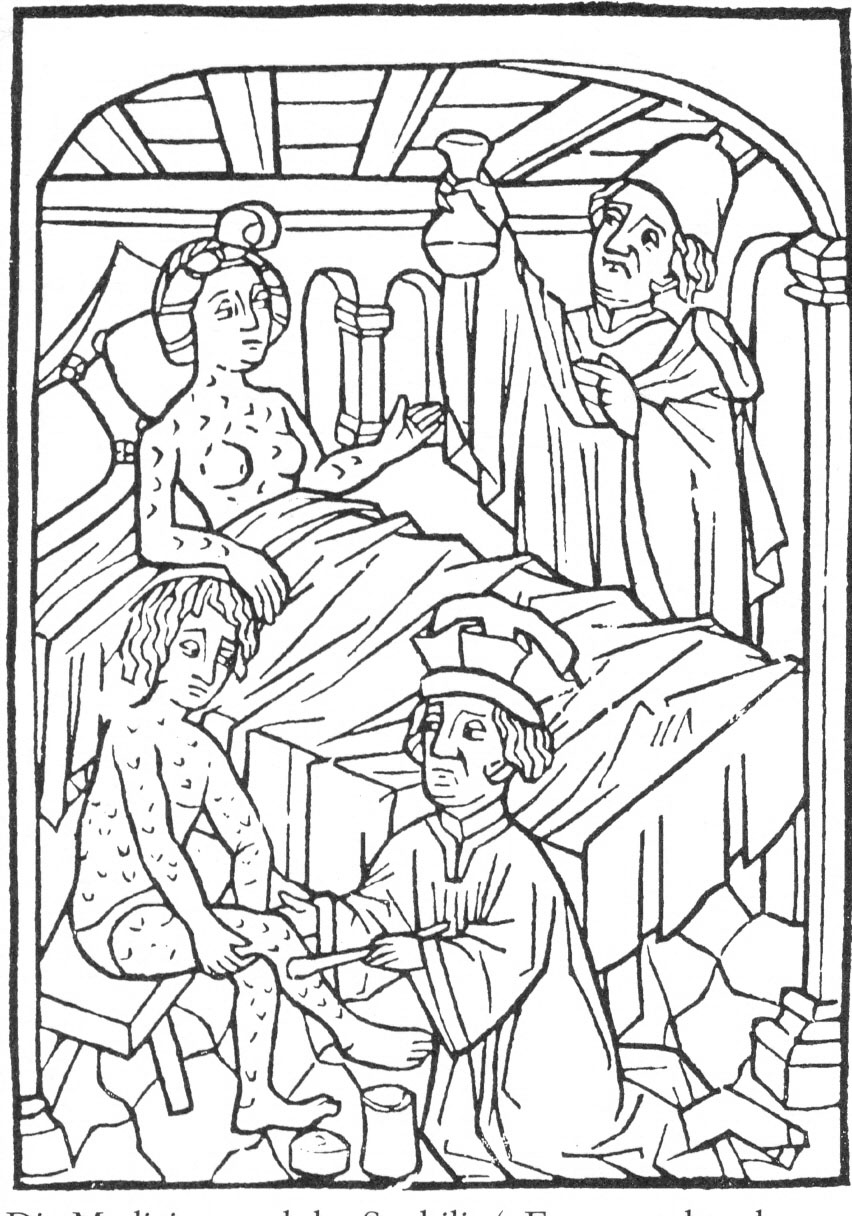
An early medical illustration of people with syphilis, Vienna, 1498

The earliest known depiction of an individual with syphilis is Albrecht Dürer's Syphilitic Man (1496), a woodcut believed to represent a Landsknecht, a Northern European mercenary. The myth of the femme fatale or "poison women" of the 19th century is believed to be partly derived from the devastation of syphilis, with classic examples in literature including John Keats' "La Belle Dame sans Merci".

The Flemish artist Stradanus designed a print called Preparation and Use of Guayaco for Treating Syphilis, a scene of a wealthy man receiving treatment for syphilis with the tropical wood guaiacum sometime around 1590.

=== Tuskegee and Guatemala studies ===
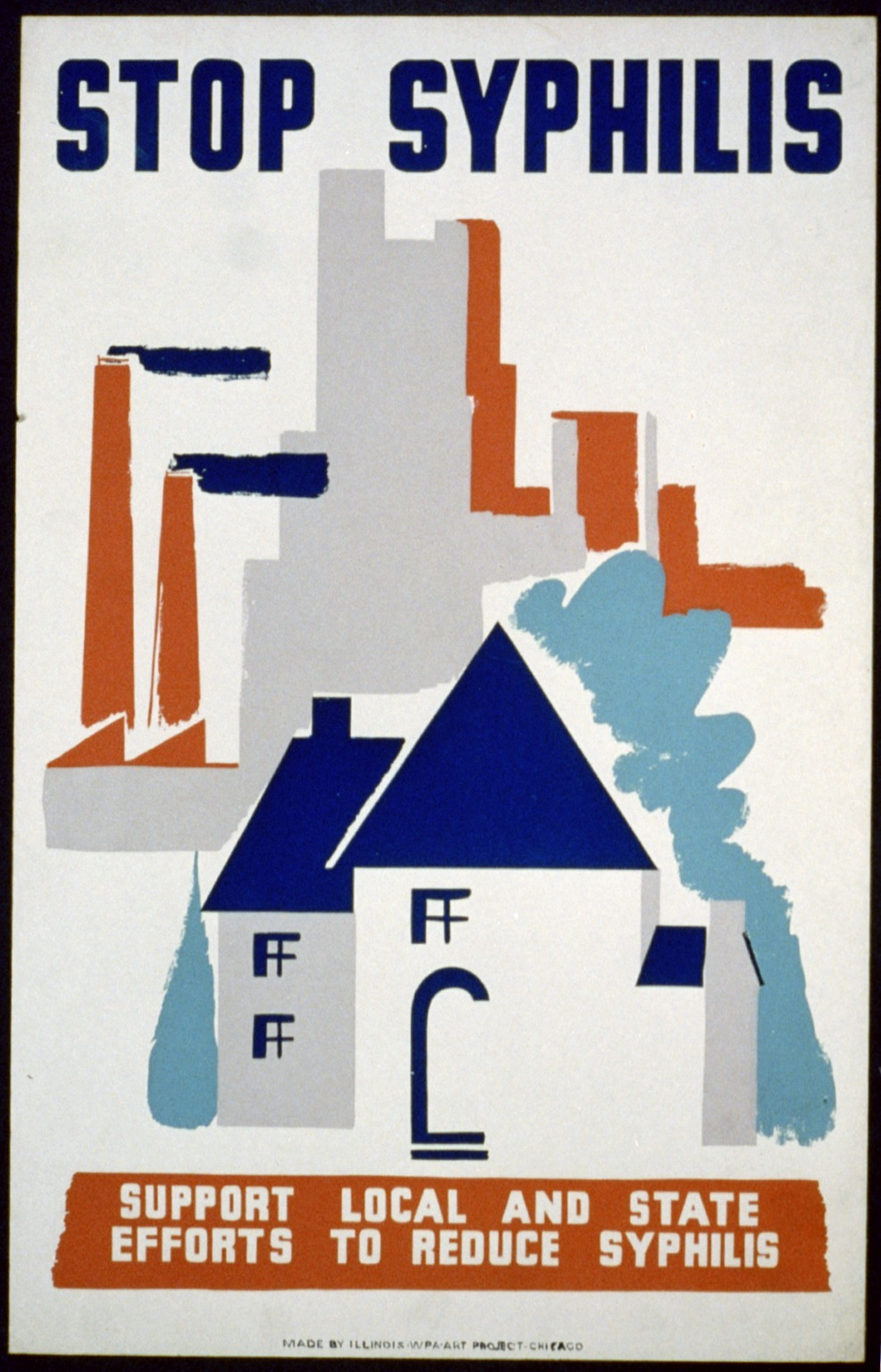
A Work Projects Administration poster about syphilis c. 1940

The "Tuskegee Study of Untreated Syphilis in the Negro Male" was an infamous, unethical and racist clinical study conducted between 1932 and 1972 by the U.S. Public Health Service. Whereas the purpose of this study was to observe the natural history of untreated syphilis, the African-American men in the study were told they were receiving free treatment for "bad blood" from the United States government.

The Public Health Service started working on this study in 1932 in collaboration with Tuskegee University, a historically black college in Alabama. Researchers enrolled 600 poor, African American sharecroppers from Macon County, Alabama in the study. Of these men, 399 had contracted syphilis before the study began, and 201 did not have the disease. Medical care, hot meals and free burial insurance were given to those who participated. The men were told that the study would last six months, but in the end, it continued for 40 years. After funding for treatment was lost, the study was continued without informing the men that they were only being studied and would not be treated. Facing insufficient participation, the Macon County Health Department nevertheless wrote to subjects to offer them a "last chance" to get a special "treatment", which was not a treatment at all, but a spinal tap administered exclusively for diagnostic purposes. None of the men infected were ever told that they had the disease, and none were treated with penicillin even after the antibiotic had been proven to successfully treat syphilis. According to the Centers for Disease Control, the men were told they were being treated for "bad blood"—a colloquialism describing various conditions such as fatigue, anemia and syphilis—which was a leading cause of death among southern African American men.

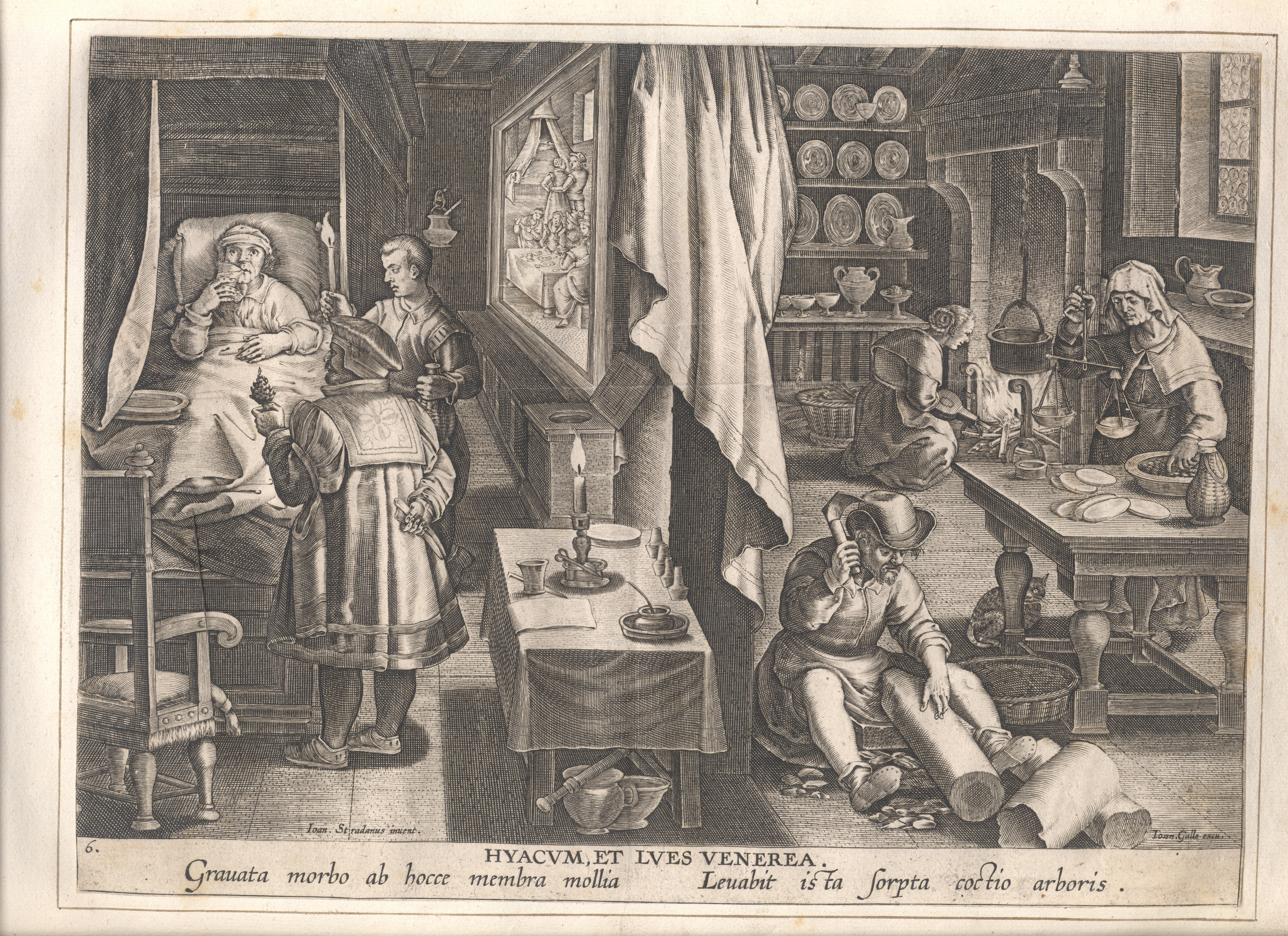
Preparation and Use of Guayaco for Treating Syphilis, after Stradanus, 1590

The 40-year study became a textbook example of criminally negligent medical ethics because researchers had knowingly withheld treatment with penicillin and because the subjects had been misled concerning the purposes of the study. The revelation in 1972 of these study failures by a whistleblower, Peter Buxtun, led to major changes in U.S. law and regulation on the protection of participants in clinical studies. Now studies require informed consent, communication of diagnosis, and accurate reporting of test results.

Similar experiments were carried out in Guatemala from 1946 to 1948. It was done during the administration of American President Harry S. Truman and Guatemalan President Juan José Arévalo with the cooperation of some Guatemalan health ministries and officials. Doctors infected soldiers, prostitutes, prisoners and mental patients with syphilis and other sexually transmitted infections, without the informed consent of the subjects and treated most subjects with antibiotics. The experiment resulted in at least 83 deaths. In October 2010, the U.S. formally apologized to Guatemala for the ethical violations that took place. Secretary of State Hillary Clinton and Health and Human Services Secretary Kathleen Sebelius stated "Although these events occurred more than 64 years ago, we are outraged that such reprehensible research could have occurred under the guise of public health. We deeply regret that it happened, and we apologize to all the individuals who were affected by such abhorrent research practices." The experiments were led by physician John Charles Cutler who also participated in the late stages of the Tuskegee syphilis experiment.

=== Mercury use ===
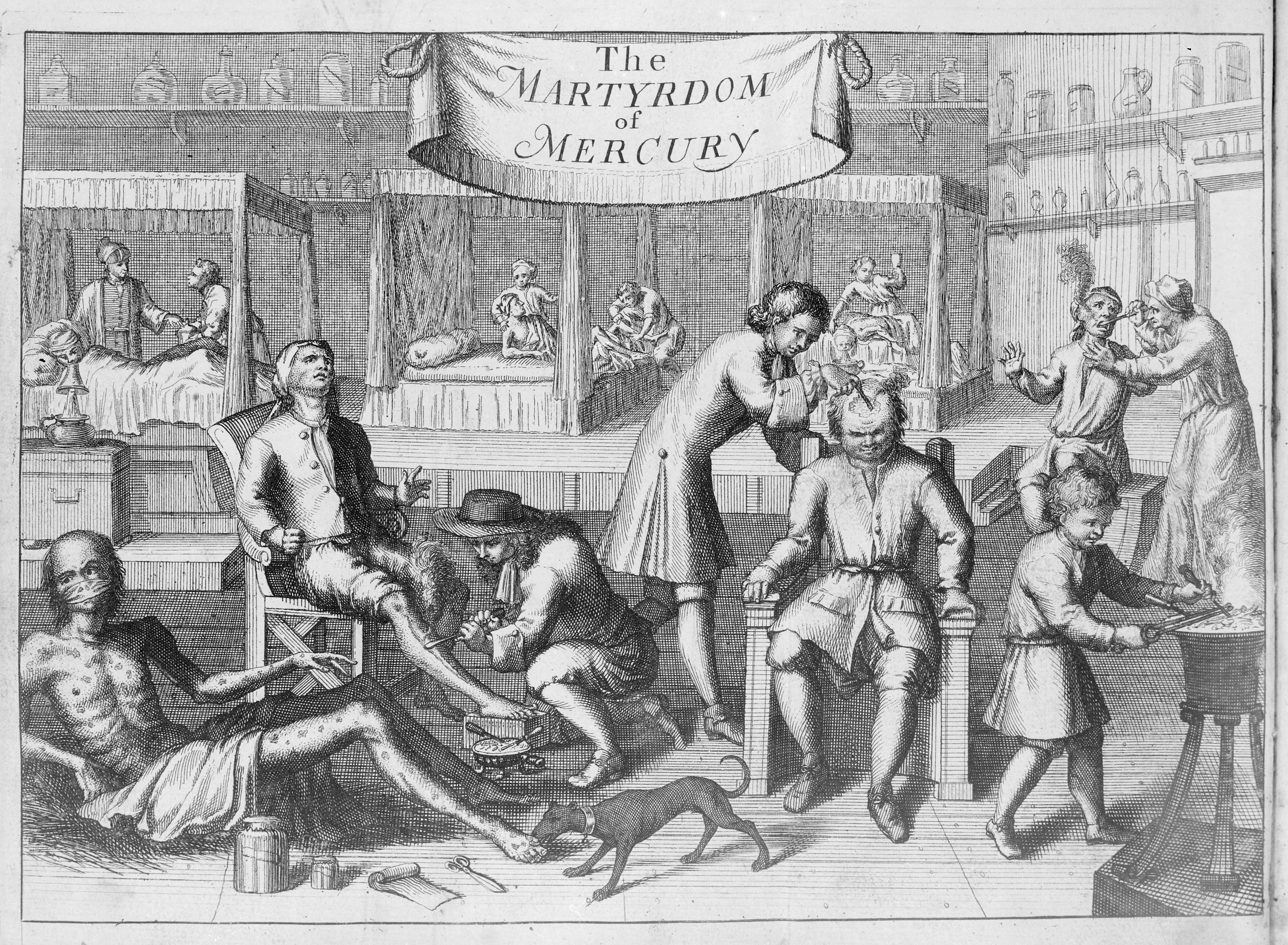
The Martyrdom of Mercury (1709), showing 18th-century hospital patients undergoing syphilis treatment.

As a form of chemotherapy, elemental mercury had been used to treat skin diseases in Europe as early as 1363. As syphilis spread, preparations of mercury were among the first medicines used to combat it. Mercury is highly anti-microbial: by the 16th century it was sometimes found to be sufficient to halt development of the disease when applied to ulcers as an inunction or when inhaled as a suffumigation. It was also treated by ingestion of mercury compounds.

Once the disease had gained a strong foothold, the amounts and forms of mercury necessary to control its development exceeded the human body's ability to tolerate it, and the treatment became worse and more lethal than the disease. Medically directed mercury poisoning became widespread through the 17th, 18th, and 19th centuries in Europe, North America, and India. Mercury salts such as mercury (II) chloride were still in prominent medical use as late as 1916, and considered effective and worthwhile treatments.

=== Names ===
Syphilis was first called grande verole or the "great pox" by the French. Other historical names have included "button scurvy", sibbens, frenga, and dichuchwa, among others. Since it was a disgraceful disease, the disease was known in several countries by the name of their neighbouring, often hostile country. The English, the Germans, and the Italians called it "the French disease", while the French referred to it as the "Neapolitan disease". The Dutch called it the "Spanish/Castilian disease". To the Turks it was known as the "Christian disease", whilst in India, the Hindus and Muslims named the disease after each other.
