= Treponema azotonutricium =

Scientific classification
- Domain: Bacteria
- Kingdom: Pseudomonadati
- Phylum: Spirochaetota
- Class: Spirochaetia
- Order: Spirochaetales
- Family: Treponemataceae
- Genus: Treponema
- Species: T. azotonutricium

Binomial name
- Treponema azotonutricium Graber et al. 2004

Species of bacterium

Treponema azotonutricium is a bacterium, the first termite gut spirochete to be isolated, together with Treponema primitia.
