= TD2 (disambiguation) =

TD-2 was a microwave relay that carried long-distance telephone in the US and Canada.

TD2 or TD-2 may also refer to:

- Taepodong-2, North Korean space launcher technology
- TD-2 RNA motif, a conserved RNA structure and metagenome sequences
- Yamaha TD2, motorcycle model
