= Treponema paraluiscuniculi =

Scientific classification
- Domain: Bacteria
- Kingdom: Pseudomonadati
- Phylum: Spirochaetota
- Class: Spirochaetia
- Order: Spirochaetales
- Family: Treponemataceae
- Genus: Treponema
- Species: T. paraluiscuniculi

Binomial name
- Treponema paraluiscuniculi (Jacobsthal, 1920) Smibert, 1974

Synonyms
- Treponema cuniculi

Species of bacteria

Treponema paraluiscuniculi is a Gram-negative, spiral-shaped bacterium. It is the etiologic agent of "Rabbit Syphilis". This condition occurs occasionally in laboratory rabbits, pet rabbits, and wild rabbits, but is not considered a significant cause of morbidity.

The organism is most commonly spread via the venereal route, however, extragenital contact transmission can occur. The lesions associated with Treponema paraluiscuniculi include edema, erythema, and papules of the mucocutaneous junctions of the vulva, prepuce, anal region, muzzle, and periorbital region that progress to ulceration and crusting. Histologically, these areas are characterized by hyperplasia of the epidermis, necrosis of epithelial cells, erosion and ulceration, and an inflammatory infiltrate composed of plasma cells, macrophages, and heterophils.

The recommended method of testing for the bacterium is skin scrape with wet mount and dark field microscopy. The organisms are also argyrophilic and will be highlighted in histologic section by a silver stain (such as Warthin-Starry). Differential diagnoses include Pasteurella (snuffles) infection, moist dermatitis, and traumatic injury.
