= Treponema bryantii =

Scientific classification
- Domain: Bacteria
- Kingdom: Pseudomonadati
- Phylum: Spirochaetota
- Class: Spirochaetia
- Order: Spirochaetales
- Family: Treponemataceae
- Genus: Treponema
- Species: T. bryantii

Binomial name
- Treponema bryantii Stanton and Canale-Parola 1980

Species of bacterium

Treponema bryantii is a species of spirochete bacteria within the genus Treponema. This species is an obligate anaerobe and is found in the rumen of cows.
