= Treponema carateum =

Scientific classification
- Domain: Bacteria
- Kingdom: Pseudomonadati
- Phylum: Spirochaetota
- Class: Spirochaetia
- Order: Spirochaetales
- Family: Treponemataceae
- Genus: Treponema
- Species: T. carateum

Binomial name
- Treponema carateum

Species of bacterium

Treponema carateum is a species of spirochete bacteria in the genus Treponema.

It is the cause of pinta, a disease affecting exclusively the skin. Children living in tropical American countries are most at risk.
