= TD-2 RNA motif =

TD-2
- Consensus secondary structure and sequence conservation of TD-2 RNA

Identifiers
- Symbol: TD-2
- Rfam: RF03162

Other data
- RNA type: Gene; sRNA
- SO: SO:0000655
- PDB structures: PDBe

The TD-2 RNA motif is a conserved RNA structure found in Treponema denticola, as well as metagenome sequences extracted from a termite hindgut, which is known to be enriched for Spirochaetes. Since TD-2 RNAs are not typically positioned in 5′ UTRs, the motif is presumed to correspond to a non-coding RNA.

The TD-2 RNA's secondary structure is supported by covariation (see secondary structure prediction), and one stem typically has terminal GNRA tetraloops, which are known to be especially stable. Surprisingly, however, the motif has an unusual number of stems containing runs of adenosines that base pair with coordinate runs of uridines. The lengths of these runs do correspond, thus comprising part of the covariation evidence in support of the motif's assignment as a conserved RNA. The first (5′-most) stem in the TD-2 RNA motif exhibits covariation, but also appears to be lost in some TD-2 RNAs.

Seven TD-2 RNAs overlap predicted representatives of the TD-1 RNA motif, but it is unknown whether these two motifs can somehow be merged.
