= Gumma (pathology) =

Soft, non-cancerous growth resulting from the tertiary stage of syphilis

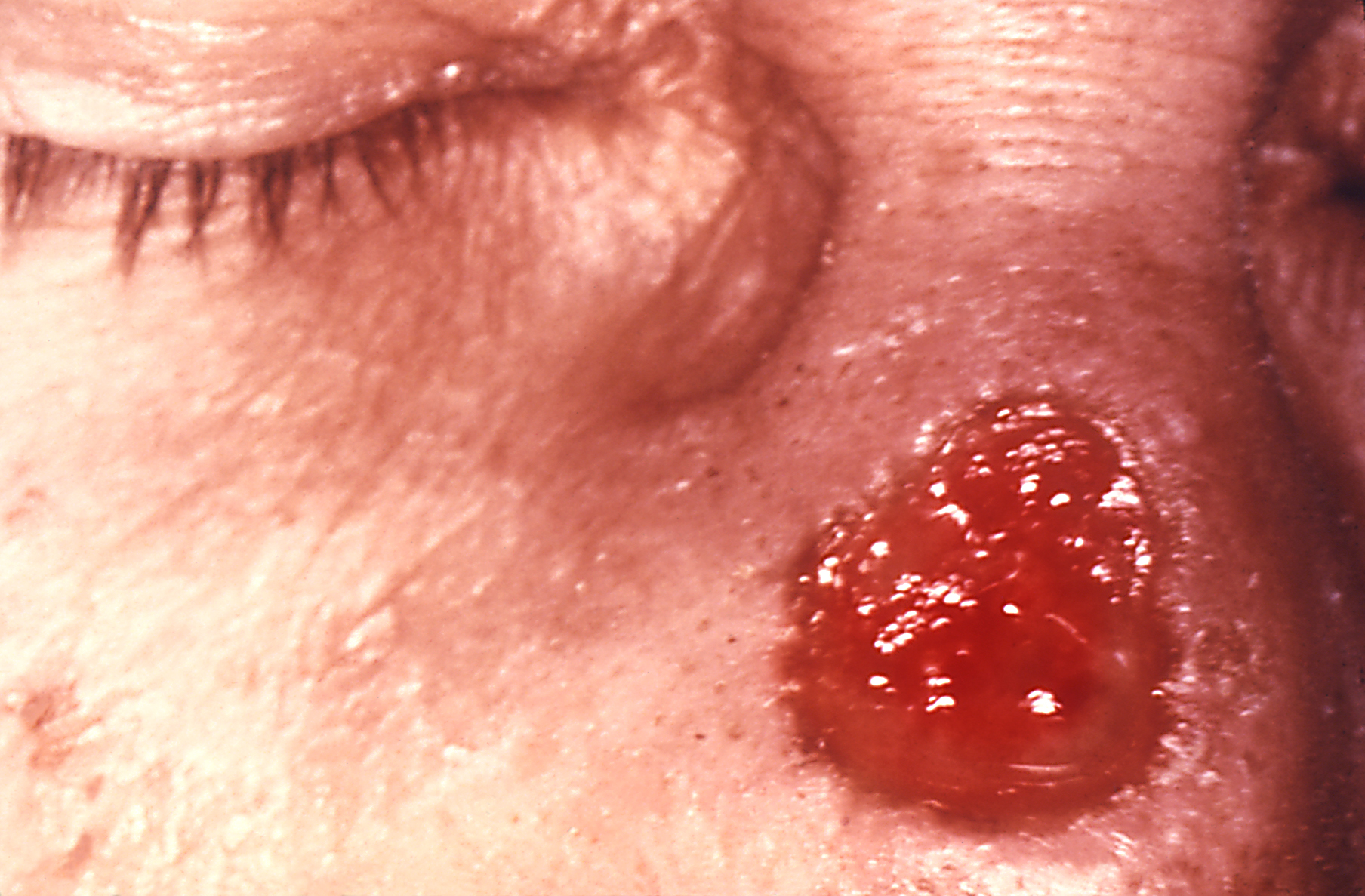
- Gumma of nose due to a long-standing tertiary syphilitic infection.
- Specialty: Infectious diseases

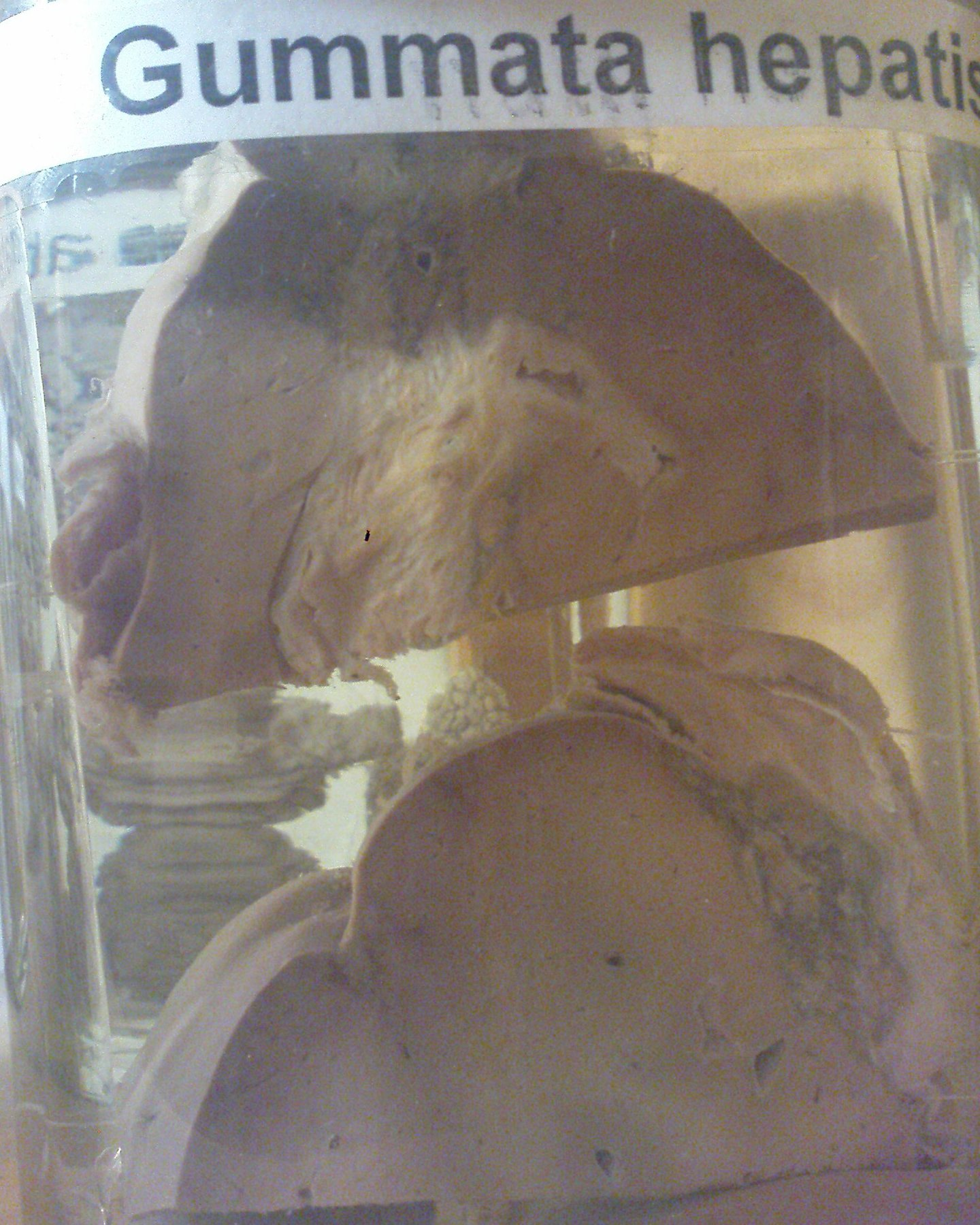
Hepatic gumma

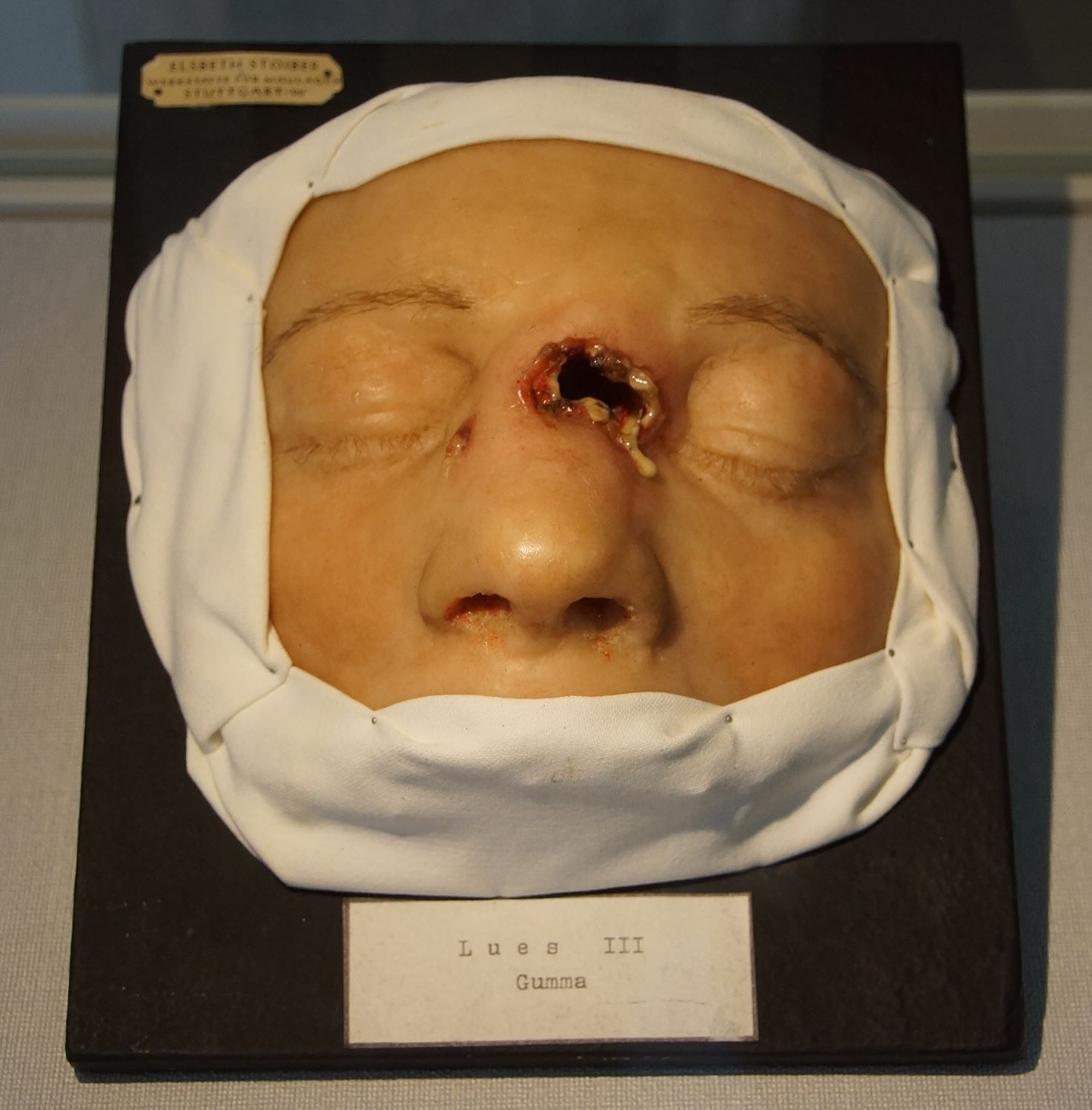
Moulage of a gumma in syphilis for training students. University of Tübingen.

A gumma (plural gummata or gummas) is a soft, non-cancerous growth resulting from the tertiary stage of syphilis (and yaws).

It is a form of granuloma. Gummas are most commonly found in the liver (gumma hepatis), but can also be found in brain, heart, skin, bone, testis, and other tissues, leading to a variety of potential problems including neurological disorders or heart valve disease.

== Presentation ==
Gummas have a firm, necrotic center surrounded by inflamed tissue, which forms an amorphous proteinaceous mass. The center may become partly hyalinized. These central regions begin to die through coagulative necrosis, though they also retain some of the structural characteristics of previously normal tissues, enabling a distinction from the granulomas of tuberculosis where caseous necrosis obliterates preexisting structures. Other histological features of gummas include an intervening zone containing epithelioid cells with indistinct borders and multinucleated giant cells, and a peripheral zone of fibroblasts and capillaries. Infiltration of lymphocytes and plasma cells can be seen in the peripheral zone as well. With time, gummas eventually undergo fibrous degeneration, leaving behind an irregular scar or a round fibrous nodule.

It is restricted to necrosis involving spirochaetal infections that cause syphilis. Growths that have the appearance of gummas are described as gummatous.

== Pathology ==
In syphilis, the gumma is caused by a reaction to spirochaete bacteria in the tissue. It appears to be the human body's way to slow down the action of this bacteria; it is a unique immune response that develops in humans after the immune system fails to kill off syphilis.

== Epidemiology ==
The formation of gummata is rare in developed countries, but common in areas that lack adequate medical treatment.

Syphilitic gummas are found in most but not all cases of tertiary syphilis, and can occur either singly or in groups. Gummatous lesions are usually associated with long-term syphilitic infection; however, such lesions can also be a symptom of benign late syphilis.
