= Treponema denticola =

Scientific classification
- Domain: Bacteria
- Kingdom: Pseudomonadati
- Phylum: Spirochaetota (Spirochaetes)
- Class: Spirochaetia
- Order: Spirochaetales
- Family: Treponemataceae
- Genus: Treponema
- Species: T. denticola

Binomial name
- Treponema denticola (ex Flügge 1886) Chan et al. 1993

Species of bacterium

Treponema denticola is a Gram-negative, obligate anaerobic, motile and highly proteolytic spirochete bacterium. It is one of four species of oral spirochetes to be reliably cultured, the others being Treponema pectinovorum, Treponema socranskii and Treponema vincentii. T. denticola dwells in a complex and diverse microbial community within the oral cavity and is highly specialized to survive in this environment. T. denticola is associated with the incidence and severity of human periodontal disease. Treponema denticola is one of three bacteria that form the Red Complex, the other two being Porphyromonas gingivalis and Tannerella forsythia. Together they form the major virulent pathogens that cause chronic periodontitis. Having elevated T. denticola levels in the mouth is considered one of the main etiological agents of periodontitis. T. denticola is related to the syphilis-causing obligate human pathogen, Treponema pallidum subsp. pallidum. It has also been isolated from women with bacterial vaginosis.

== Genome ==
The first genome of T. denticola to be sequenced was strain 35405 which was initially isolated and designated as the type strain by Chan et al. The 2,843,201-bp genome sequence encodes 2,786􏴲 open reading frames (ORFs) as well a 6 rRNAs and 44 tRNAs. This is in stark contrast to the minimal genome of Treponema pallidum which encodes only 1,040 ORFs.

== Cell structure ==
Tightly organized bundles of periplasmic flagella were observed in the periplasm, a characteristic of spirochetes. The presence of the periplasmic flagella is widely regarded as being responsible for the microorganism's ability to rotate and flex, in addition to its translational movement. Spirochetes, including Treponema denticola, are therefore able to navigate through particularly viscous environments, unlike that of other prokaryotes.

The tapering of the cell ends, conserved between cells, encompass a patella-shaped structure observed in the periplasm at the cell tip. This structure might be involved in the polar attachment of the cells.

== Adherence and cytotoxicity ==
The main site for T. denticola habitation in the oral cavity is the gingival crevice. These spirochetes attach to proteins (including fibronectin and collagen) of local gingival fibroblasts, binding to their plasma membrane. A 53-kDa surface protein on T. denticola is responsible for transporting its components into the host cell, exhibiting a cytotoxic effect. Accumulation of T. denticola in this manner facilitates the disease-causing process, including membrane blebbing and red blood cell lysis.

== Role in disease ==
=== Periodontal disease ===
Periodontal disease is a type of gum disease caused by the accumulation of plaque on the teeth due to poor oral hygiene. Plaque is a sticky substance that contains bacteria which can harden into a substance called calculus, irritating the gums.

Treponema denticola, a subgingival oral spirochete has been associated with many periodontal disease conditions such as: the early stage of periodontitis, acute pericoronitis (infection under the gum tissue covering a partially erupted tooth)^{3}, as well as necrotising ulcerative gingivitis (severe inflammation of the gum more common in immunocompromised patients). It relates to lesions limited to gingival tissue.

Clinical evidence and research shows that periodontal pockets contain large numbers of Treponema denticola together with other proteolytic gram negative bacteria, playing an important role in the development of periodontal disease. The toxic products of these bacteria, especially Treponema denticola may damage the surface lining periodontal cells making them more prone to damage as well as lysis. Treponema denticola attaches to fibroblasts and epithelial cells as well as to extracellular matrix components which are found in periodontal tissues and release its own bacterial contents. The bacterial components are:

- Outer sheath associated peptidases
- Chymotrypsin proteinases
- Trypsin proteinases
- Hemolytic activities
- Hemagglutinating activities
- outer-sheath protein with pore-forming properties

A number of studies have observed an increase of T. denticola in patients with orthodontic appliances, particularly the fixed type.

=== Oral cancer ===
Treponema denticola is a potential etiological bacterial agent for oral cancer. It encourages oncogenesis (process in which healthy cells become cancer cells) and therefore the progression of oral cancer through chronic inflammation advancing invasiveness of the cancer cells. This results in the ceasing of cell apoptosis (inhibition of controlled cell death – a safety mechanism within cells to stop more damage from occurring), resulting in rapid growth and multiplication of cancer cells. This suppresses the immune system stopping the body from recognising the cancerous cells and as a result more cancer-promoting substances are produced. The presence of T. denticola along with other periodontal pathogens and bacterial diversity within the oral cavity are important factors contributing to cancerous cells (including precancerous gastric lesions).

=== Vascular disease ===
Atherosclerotic vascular disease is chronic inflammatory disease of large arteries distinguished by invasion, proliferation and accumulation of cells from arterial smooth muscle cells, and the circulating blood in the intimal layer with deposition of connective tissue and lipids, if left to get worse atherosclerotic vascular disease can result in cardiovascular disease. Cardiovascular disease (including angina, heart attack, arrhythmias, heart failure, strokes) is the leading cause of death globally.

Substantial evidence between inflammation from infectious agents and development of atherosclerosis – periodontal pathogens prominent contenders due to chronic inflammation related with periodontal disease.

Treponema denticola bacteria can penetrate gingival tissues and circulate through blood vessels, with opportunity to invade the heart and cardiovascular epithelium in medium to large arteries – including aorta, coronary and carotid arteries.

=== Pancreatic cancer ===
It has been recognised that there is an association between oral and intestinal cancer related deaths and chronic periodontitis. This is based on the high amounts of tumor suppressor gene p53 mutations and k-ras arginine mutations found in patients with pancreatic cancer. Peptidylarginine deiminases from oral bacteria are thought to be responsible for these mutations. This means that there could be a causative link between oral bacteria, particularly the red complex, and pancreatic cancer.

== See also ==
- Oral microbiology
- Periodontitis
- List of bacterial vaginosis microbiota
