= Treponema vincentii =

Scientific classification
- Domain: Bacteria
- Kingdom: Pseudomonadati
- Phylum: Spirochaetota
- Class: Spirochaetia
- Order: Spirochaetales
- Family: Treponemataceae
- Genus: Treponema
- Species: T. vincentii

Binomial name
- Treponema vincentii (ex Brumpt 1922) Smibert 1984

Species of bacterium

Treponema vincentii is a species of Treponema. It is implicated as a pathogen in chronic periodontitis which can induce bone loss. This motile bacillus is a spirochaete.

It was previously known as Borrelia vincentii (Blanchard, 1906).
