= Pinta (disease) =

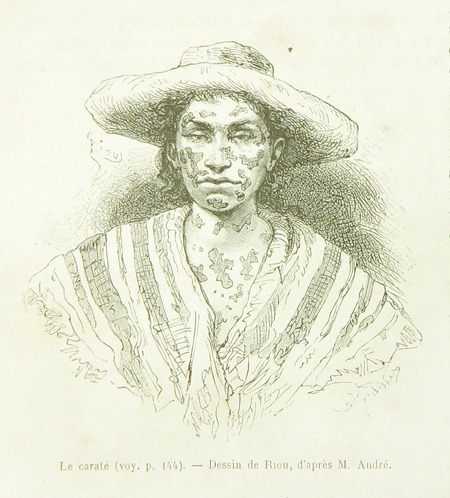
- 1869 illustration depicting a person with pinta disease.
- Specialty: Infectious disease

Pinta (also known as azul, carate, empeines, lota, mal del pinto, and tina) is a human, skin disease caused by infection with the spirochete Treponema carateum, which is morphologically and serologically indistinguishable from the bacterium that causes syphilis and bejel. The disease was previously known to be endemic to Mexico, Central America, and South America; it may have been eradicated since, with the latest case occurring in Brazil in 2020.

== Signs and symptoms ==
Pinta, the least severe of the treponemal infections being limited to the skin, is thought to be transmitted by skin-to-skin contact (similar to bejel and yaws), and after an incubation period of two to three weeks, produces a raised papule, which enlarges and becomes hyperkeratotic (scaly/flaky).

Lesions are usually present on the exposed surface of arms and legs.

Local lymph nodes might be enlarged. Three to nine months later, further thickened and flat lesions (pintids) appear all over the body. These generally resolve, but a proportion of people with pinta will go on to develop the late-stage disease, characterised by widespread pigmentary change with a mixture of hyperpigmentation and depigmentation that can be disfiguring.

== Cause ==
Pinta is caused by the bacterium Treponema carateum. It is related to the more well-known T. pallidum, which can cause syphilis.

== Diagnosis ==
Diagnosis is usually clinical, but as with yaws and bejel, serological tests for syphilis, such as rapid plasma reagin (RPR) and TPHA, will be positive, and the spirochetes can be seen on dark field microscopy of samples taken from the early papules.

== Treatment ==
The disease can be treated with penicillin, tetracycline (not to be used in pregnant women), azithromycin or chloramphenicol, and can be prevented through contact tracing by public health officials. A single intramuscular injection of BPG is effective against the diseases pinta, yaws, and bejel.

== See also ==
- List of cutaneous conditions
