= Göker =

Göker is a surname. Notable people with the surname include:

- Turhan Göker (1930-2022), Turkish track and field athlete
- Yaren Berfe Göker (born 1999), Turkish handballer
