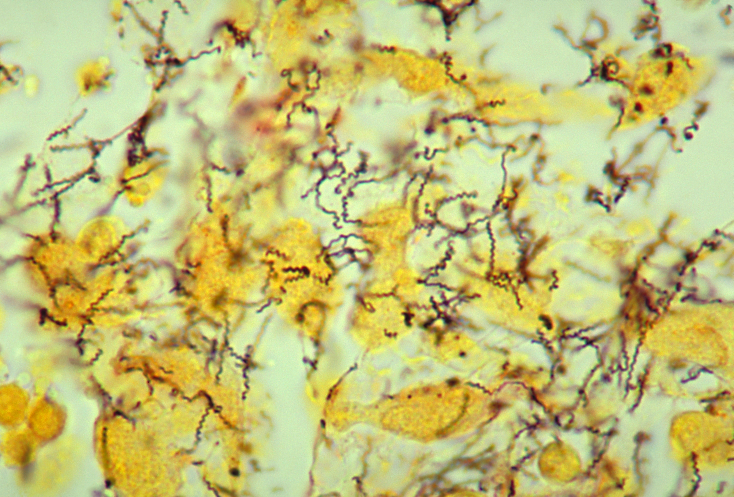
- Histopathology of Treponema pallidum spirochetes using a modified Steiner silver stain

Scientific classification
- Domain: Bacteria
- Kingdom: Pseudomonadati
- Phylum: Spirochaetota
- Class: Spirochaetia
- Order: Spirochaetales
- Family: Treponemataceae; Robinson 1948 (Approved Lists 1980)

Genera
- "Ca. Avitreponema"; Brucepastera; "Ca. Gallitreponema"; Teretinema; Treponema

Synonyms
- Treponemidae Castellani & Chalmers 1919

= Treponemataceae =

Family of bacteria

The Treponemataceae are a family of spirochete bacteria. The clade includes a number of significant pathogens, such as Treponema pallidum, the cause of human syphilis.

== Phylogeny ==
The currently accepted taxonomy is based on the List of Prokaryotic names with Standing in Nomenclature (LPSN) and National Center for Biotechnology Information (NCBI).

16S rRNA based LTP_10_2024

- - - Rectinemataceae
      Rectinema Koelschbach et al. 2017
  - - Breznakiellaceae
      - - Gracilinema Brune et al. 2022
        - Zuelzera Brune et al. 2022
      - - Breznakiella Song et al. 2022
        - - Treponema primitia
          - - Helmutkoenigia Brune et al. 2022
            - Leadbettera Brune et al. 2022
    - Treponemataceae
      - - - Brucepastera Song et al. 2023
          - Teretinema Song et al. 2023
        - Treponema Schaudinn 1905
      - Treponema species-group 2

120 marker proteins based GTDB 10-RS226

- "Treponematales"
  - - Rectinemataceae
      Rectinema
  - - Breznakiellaceae
      - Gracilinema
      - - Treponema primitia
        - - Breznakiella
          - Leadbettera
    - Treponemataceae
      - - "Ca. Gallitreponema" Gilroy et al. 2021
        - Treponema_C, D, F, & G
      - - - "Ca. Avitreponema" Gilroy et al. 2021
          - - Brucepastera
            - Teretinema
        - Treponema

== See also ==
- List of bacteria genera
- List of bacterial orders
