= Neurosyphilis =

Infection of the central nervous system in a patient with syphilis

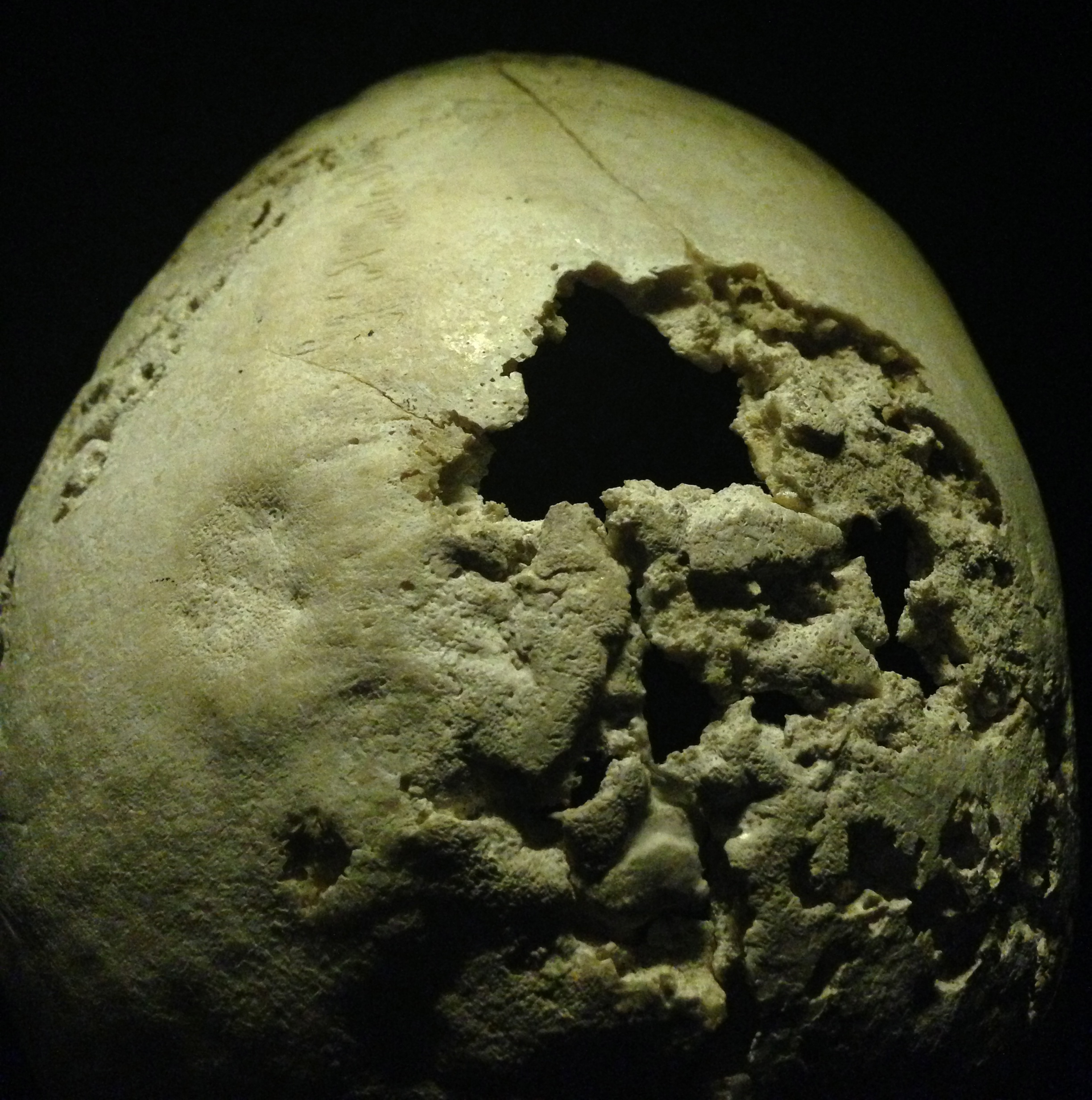
- Section of human skull damaged by late stages of neurosyphilis
- Specialty: Neurology, infectious diseases
- Symptoms: Headache, stiff neck, paresthesia, loss of bladder control, personality and mood changes
- Causes: Treponema pallidum
- Risk factors: HIV infection, unprotected sex
- Treatment: Antibiotics (penicillin G or ceftriaxone)

Neurosyphilis is the infection of the central nervous system by Treponema pallidum, the bacterium that causes the sexually transmitted infection syphilis. In the era of modern antibiotics, the majority of neurosyphilis cases have been reported in HIV-infected patients.

Neurosyphilis may present a variety of symptoms that depend on the affected structure of the central nervous system. While early neurosyphilis is often asymptomatic, meningitis is the most common neurological presentation of the early stage. Late neurosyphilis typically involves the brain and spinal cord parenchyma, manifesting as tabes dorsalis and general paresis. Tertiary syphilis can involve several different organ systems, though neurosyphilis may occur at any stage of infection.

Clinical history, a physical neurological examination, and a lumbar puncture to obtain cerebrospinal fluid (CSF) for analysis are crucial for diagnosing neurosyphilis. There is no single laboratory test to confirm the diagnosis of neurosyphilis in all cases. A positive CSF-VDRL test in the presence of neurological symptoms is sufficient for a diagnosis, but additional tests may be needed in certain instances.

Standard treatment is an infusion of intravenous penicillin G for 10 to 14 days. Patients with neurosyphilis should also be evaluated for HIV, and their sexual partners should be properly evaluated by a medical professional.

== Signs and symptoms ==
While the stages of syphilis are categorized as primary, secondary, latent, and tertiary, neurosyphilis is typically categorized into early, intermediate, and late stages. Neurosyphilis may occur any time after initial infection.

=== Early and intermediate neurosyphilis ===
Early neurosyphilis often has no clinical symptoms. Meningitis is the most common neurological presentation in early syphilis, typically arising within one year of initial infection. Symptoms of syphilitic meningitis are similar to other forms of meningitis, including headache, neck stiffness, photophobia, confusion, nausea, and vomiting. Meningeal inflammation may also affect the cranial nerves, most commonly the facial nerve, presenting as facial paralysis. Cerebral gummas, which are caused by granulomatous destruction of the brain from syphilis, can also cause symptoms of meningitis.

Meningovascular syphilis is often in the intermediate stage of neurosyphilis, typically presenting 5 to 12 years after infection. It is due to inflammation of the blood vessels supplying the central nervous system, resulting in the death of brain tissue called ischemia. It may present as stroke or spinal cord injury. Signs and symptoms vary with the blood vessel that is affected. The middle cerebral artery is most often affected, causing a variety of symptoms including weakness, sensory loss, eye deviation, and hemineglect syndrome.

=== Late neurosyphilis ===
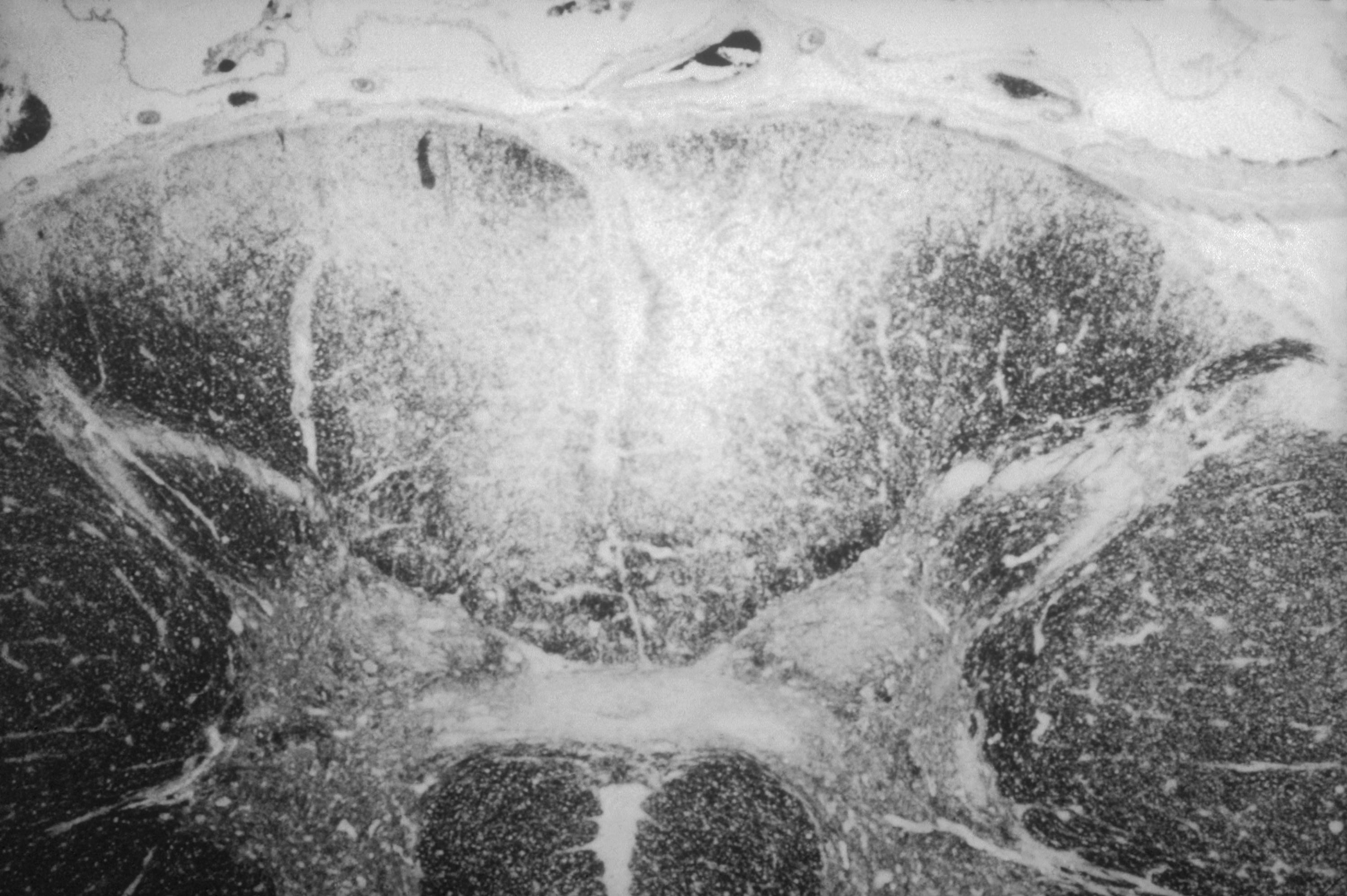
Tabes dorsalis is a form of late neurosyphilis that affects the posterior columns of the spinal cord.

Parenchymal syphilis occurs in the late stage of neurosyphilis, with average presentation occurring 15 to 25 years after initial infection. This stage of the disease is generally in the form of tabes dorsalis or general paresis. Tabes dorsalis, also called locomotor ataxia, describes a constellation of symptoms resulting from a degenerative process of the posterior columns of the spinal cord. Symptoms include pain, ataxic wide-based gait, paresthesias, bowel or bladder incontinence, loss of position and vibratory sense, acute episodic gastrointestinal pain, Charcot joints, and reduced reflexes. The Argyll Robertson pupil, which is a condition where the pupils do not constrict to bright light but constrict when focusing on a near object (accommodation reflex), is another feature that may be present.

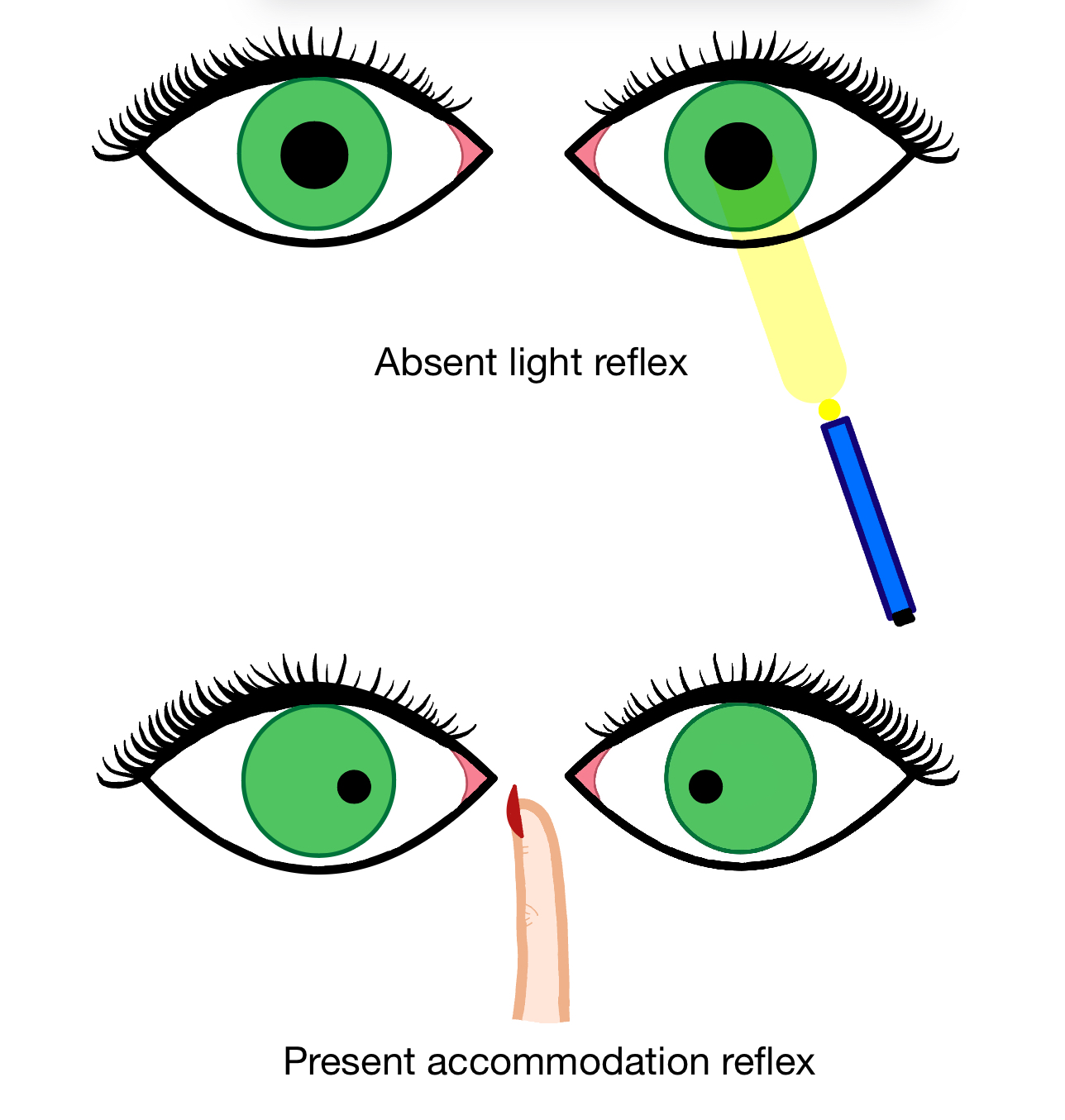
Argyll Robertson pupils, a clinical feature of neurosyphilis, are characterized by pupils that do not react to light but have an intact accommodation reflex.

Another late form of neurosyphilis is general paresis, which is a slow degenerative process of the brain. Neuropsychiatric symptoms might appear due to overall damage to the brain. These symptoms can make the diagnosis more difficult and can include symptoms of dementia, mania, psychosis, depression, and delirium. These symptoms may progress to the point of where a patient becomes bedridden.

=== Ocular syphilis and otosyphilis ===
Nearly any part of the eye may be involved in neurosyphilis, resulting in ocular syphilis. The most common form of ocular syphilis is uveitis. Other forms include episcleritis, vitritis, retinitis, papillitis, retinal detachment, and interstitial keratitis. Patients typically present with worsening vision.

Otosyphilis refers to a type of neurosyphilis that affects the vestibulocochlear nerve, causing issues with hearing and balance. Signs include loss of hearing, tinnitus, vertigo, and gait instability.

Ocular syphilis and otosyphilis may occur at any point after initial infection, and their presentation can overlap with other symptoms of neurosyphilis.

== Risk factors ==
There are several risk factors for neurosyphilis that overlap with the risk factors for syphilis and other sexually transmitted infection, including high-risk sexual behavior, such as unprotected sex and multiple sexual partners. A significant proportion of syphilis cases are seen among males, especially men who have sex with men. There is also an association between patients who are infected with syphilis and HIV. The link between syphilis and HIV is thought to be because of shared risk factors. Another possibility is that a weakened immune system, such as those in people with HIV, may decrease the body's ability to clear the infection from the central nervous system. The standard treatment for HIV infection, antiretroviral therapy, suppresses HIV transmission but not syphilis transmission.

== Pathophysiology ==
Treponema pallidum is the spirochete-shaped bacterium that causes neurosyphilis. The pathogenesis is not fully known, in part because the organism is not easily cultured, making scientific experiments difficult. Within days to weeks after initial infection, T. pallidum spreads throughout the body via blood and lymphatic vessels. The organism may proliferate in the perivascular spaces of nearly any organ, including the central nervous system (CNS). It is unclear why some patients with syphilis develop a persistent CNS infection, and others do not. Scientists have also debated if neurosyphilis is the result of the bacterial invasion of the CNS or the immune system responding to bacteria in the CNS.

In primary or secondary syphilis, invasion of the protective membrane of the brain called the meninges may result in lymphocytic and plasma cell infiltration of perivascular spaces. The immune response may affect the brain and spinal cord through inflammation and necrosis of small blood vessels. In tertiary syphilis, reactivation of a chronic latent infection causes severe inflammation of CNS arteries called endarteritis obliterans, leading to meningovascular syphilis.

Parenchymal syphilis is present late in neurosyphilis as tabes dorsalis and general paresis. Tabes dorsalis is thought to be due to irreversible loss of myelin in nerve fibers of the posterior columns of the spinal cord involving the lumbosacral and lower thoracic levels. General paresis is caused by chronic inflammation of the meninges and brain, leading to fibrosis of the meninges, atrophy of the cerebral cortex, and the formation of demyelinating plaques, particularly in the frontal and parietal lobes. Rarely, T. pallidum may invade any structures of the eye (such as cornea, anterior chamber, vitreous and choroid, and optic nerve) and cause local inflammation and edema.

== Diagnosis ==
There is no single test that is sufficient on its own to make a diagnosis of neurosyphilis in every case. Serum studies are used to determine if a patient has preexisting syphilis. Common serum studies to diagnose syphilis include the rapid plasma reagin and the Venereal Disease Research Laboratory (VDRL) test. To diagnose neurosyphilis, a clinical history, physical examination, and cerebrospinal fluid (CSF) analysis are required. Lumbar puncture ("spinal tap") is the procedure to obtain CSF. The VDRL test of the CSF is a common test for making a diagnosis of neurosyphilis. A positive VDRL test in the presence of neurological symptoms is sufficient to confirm a diagnosis of neurosyphilis. However, a negative VDRL result does not rule out neurosyphilis. Due to the low sensitivity of the VDRL test, CSF analyses that specifically look for antibodies against T. pallidum, such as the fluorescent treponemal antibody absorption test (FTA-ABS) and the T. pallidum particle agglutination assay (TPPA), are also used in certain cases. The FTA-ABS test is more sensitive but less specific than the VDRL test. Reported sensitivity of different tests for neurosyphilis are variable.

Other components of CSF analysis can be helpful for diagnosing neurosyphilis. The CSF white blood cell count is often elevated in neurosyphilis, but this finding is nonspecific and can be unreliable in patients with other infections such as HIV. Similarly, an elevated CSF protein may be suggestive of neurosyphilis, but it is a nonspecific result.

== Treatment ==
Penicillin is used to treat neurosyphilis. The Centers for Disease Control and Prevention recommend the following regimen:

- Aqueous penicillin G 3–4 million units every four hours (18–24 million units per day) for 10 to 14 days.

Alternatively:

- One daily intramuscular injection of procaine penicillin G 24 million units and oral probenecid 500 mg four times daily, both for 10 to 14 days

Follow-up blood serum tests are generally performed at 3, 6, 12, and 24 months to ensure successful treatment. The CDC states that repeated CSF studies are unnecessary for people with intact immune systems and people with HIV who are on adequate ART. All patients with syphilis should be tested for HIV infection. All cases of syphilis should be reported to public health authorities and public health departments can aid in partner notification, testing, and determining need for treatment.

The treatment success is measured with a fourfold drop in the nontreponemal antibody test. In early-stage syphilis drop should occur in 6–12 months; in late syphilis drop can take 12–24 months. Titers may decline more slowly in persons who have previously had syphilis.

In people who are allergic to penicillin, initiation of penicillin desensitization is advised. If desensitization is not possible, the CDC recommends ceftriaxone as an alternative. Doxycycline or tetracycline may be considered in select patients for treating neurosyphilis.

=== Complications ===
The Jarisch–Herxheimer reaction is an immune-mediated response to syphilis therapy occurring within 2–24 hours. The exact mechanisms of reaction are unclear, however most likely caused by proinflammatory treponemal lipoproteins that are released from dead and dying organisms following antibiotic treatment. It is typically characterized by fever, headache, myalgia, and possibly intensification of skin rash. It most often occurs in early-stage syphilis (up to 50%-75% of patients with primary and secondary syphilis). It is usually self-limiting and managed with antipyretics and nonsteroidal anti-inflammatory medications.

== History ==
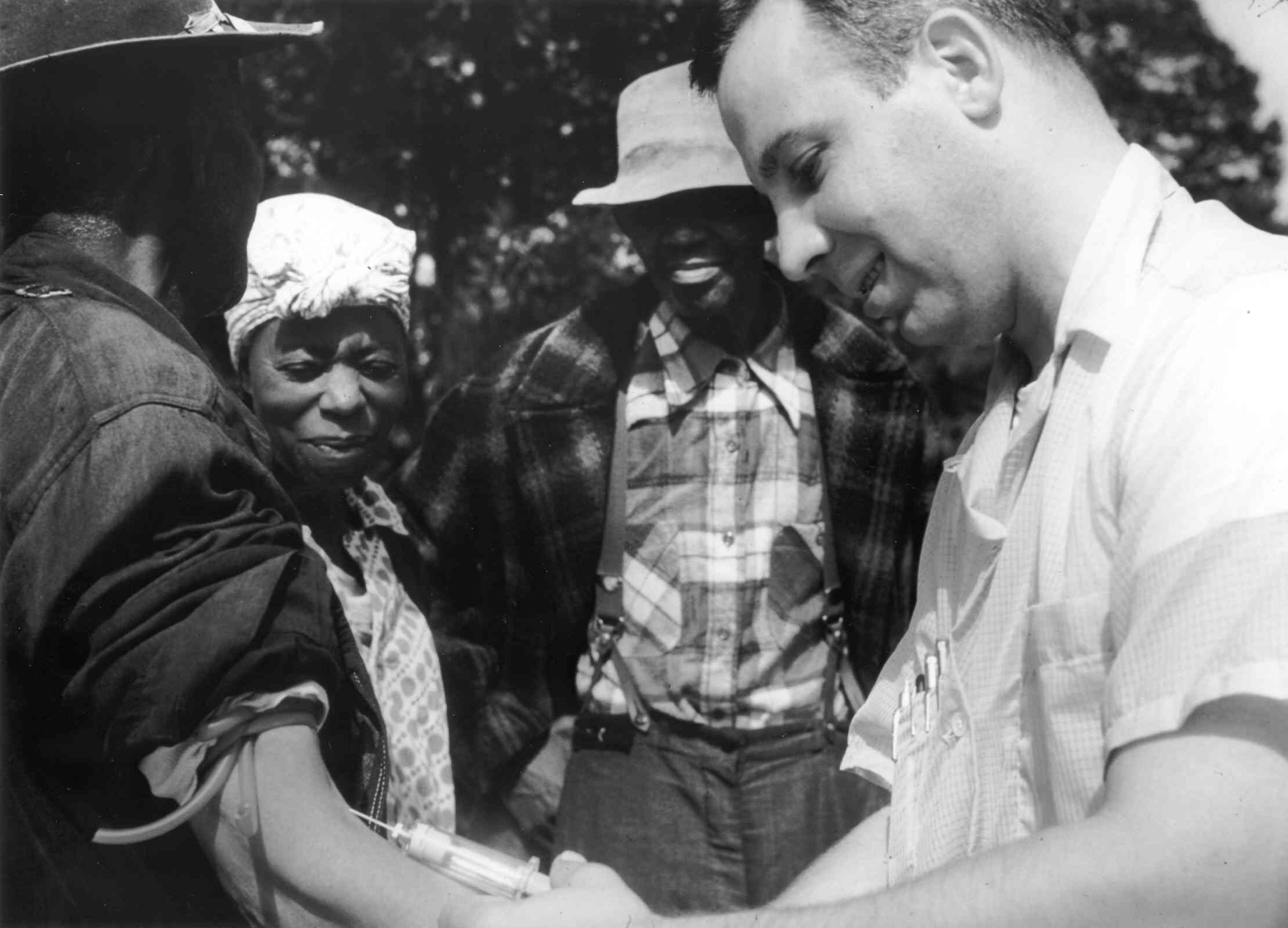
A subject of the Tuskegee Syphilis Study getting their blood drawn.

Historically, syphilis was studied under the Tuskegee study, often cited as an example of unethical human experimentation. The study began without informed consent of the subjects and was continued by the United States Public Health Service until 1972. The researchers failed to notify and withheld treatment for patients despite knowing penicillin was found as an effective cure for syphilis. After four years of follow-up, neurosyphilis was identified in 26.1% of patients vs. 2.5% of controls. After 20 years of follow-up, 6.5% showed signs of neurosyphilis and 40% had died from other causes.
