= Rapid plasma reagin =

Test for syphilis

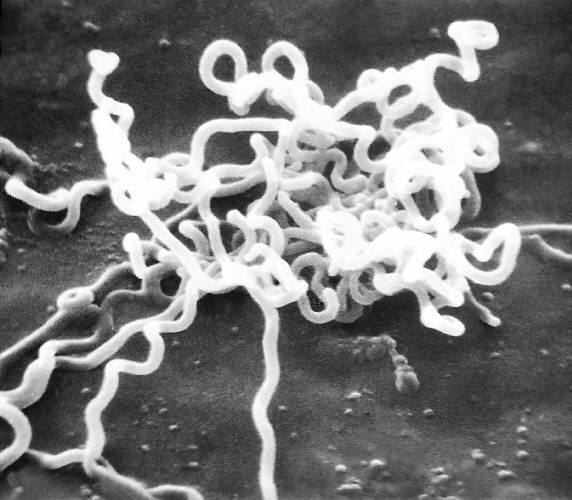
- Treponema pallidum, the bacterium that causes syphilis
- Synonyms: RPR titer
- Purpose: test to indicate a syphilis infection

The rapid plasma reagin test (RPR test or RPR titer) is a type of rapid diagnostic test that looks for non-specific antibodies in the blood of the patient that may indicate an infection by syphilis or related non-venereal treponematoses. It is one of several nontreponemal tests for syphilis (along with the Wassermann test and the VDRL test). The term reagin means that this test does not look for antibodies against the bacterium itself, Treponema pallidum, but rather for antibodies against substances released by cells when they are damaged by T. pallidum (cardiolipin and lecithin). Traditionally, syphilis serologic testing has been performed using a nontreponemal test (NTT) such as the RPR or VDRL test, with positive results then confirmed using a specific treponemal test (TT) such as TPPA or FTA-ABS. This method is endorsed by the U.S. Centers for Disease Control and Prevention (CDC) and is the standard in many parts of the world. After screening for syphilis, a titer can be used to track the progress of the disease over time and its response to therapy.

== Accuracy ==
The RPR test is an effective screening test that is very good at detecting syphilis in people without symptoms. The NTT screening tests should always be followed up by a more specific treponemal test. Tests based on monoclonal antibodies and immunofluorescence, including T. pallidum hemagglutination assay (TPHA) and fluorescent treponemal antibody absorption (FTA-ABS) are more specific and more expensive. Nontreponemal tests (NTT) measure levels of immunoglobulin G (IgG) and immunoglobulin M (IgM) antibodies produced by the host in response to lipoidal material (mostly cardiolipin) released from damaged host cells. It is also generally believed that some cardiolipin is released by the spirochetes.

== Alternatives ==
Another test often used to screen for syphilis is the Venereal Disease Research Laboratory (VDRL) slide test. However, the RPR test is generally preferred due to its ease of use. Other types of tests are being evaluated as possible alternatives to standard manual RPR testing. One of these alternatives is a fully automated RPR syphilis analyzer. It also returns positive for other, non-venereal treponematoses. It has been recommended that a careful explanation of this fact be included with test results.
