= Julius Citron =

German physician and medical researcher (1878–1952)

Julius Bernard Citron
- Born: October 26, 1878; Berlin, Prussia
- Died: January 18, 1952 (aged 73); Cairo, Egypt
- Resting place: Bassatine Jewish Cemetery
- Known for: Wassermann Test
- Spouse: Lilli Alice Schayer (1893 - 1932) (m. 1919; 3 children)
- Children: Ralph, Herbert and Evelyn Citron
- Scientific career
- Fields: Bacteriology, Immunology, Serology and Internal Medicine

Julius Bernhard Citron (26 October 1878 – 18 January 1952) was a German Jewish physician and researcher specializing in internal medicine, bacteriology, immunology, and serology. He made notable contributions to the development of diagnostic methods for infectious diseases, particularly through improvements to the Wassermann test for syphilis and early work on tuberculosis diagnostics. His career spanned Germany, British Mandatory Palestine, and Egypt.

== Early life and education ==
Citron was born in Berlin, Germany, to Judah David Leib Citron and Lina Aronsohn. He studied medicine at universities in Munich, Freiburg, and Berlin, receiving his degree from the University of Freiburg in 1902.

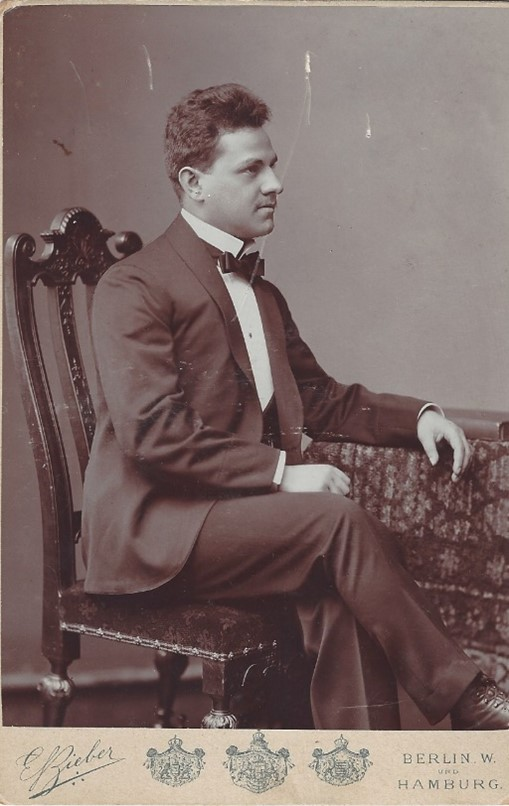
Julius Citron 1898

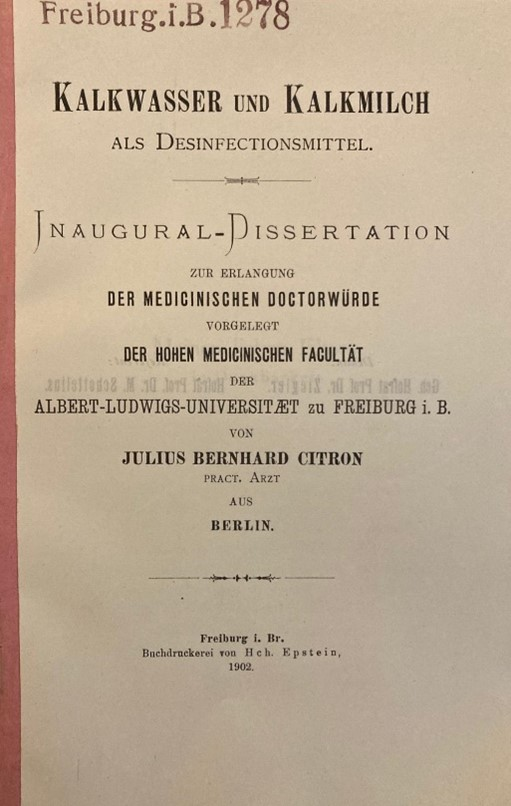
Julius Citon's Dissertation

== Career ==
In 1904, Citron joined the Robert Koch Institute in Berlin, working in the department led by August von Wassermann. There, he contributed to the refinement of the Wassermann test for syphilis, increasing its diagnostic reliability by using a large, stratified human serum sample and applying improved controls.

=== Improvements to the Wassermann test ===
The Wassermann test was one of the first blood tests for syphilis. Citron's version of the test achieved greater specificity and sensitivity, helping to standardize its clinical application across Europe. In 1921, the League of Nations Health Organization selected Citron’s method as the most technically reliable among competing versions.

=== Development of tuberculosis diagnostics ===
In 1906, Wassermann and Carl Bruck developed a serodiagnostic test for tuberculosis using bacterial extracts. Concurrently and independently, Citron developed a serodiagnostic test for tuberculosis using the entire bacterium. With a reliably high rate of true positives, these would be the world’s earliest successful blood tests.

=== Research on infectious diseases ===
Beyond syphilis and tuberculosis, Citron conducted research on gonorrhea, typhus, meningitis, cholera, tetanus, and swine influenza. His work helped improve understanding of immune responses and diagnostic methods for these conditions.

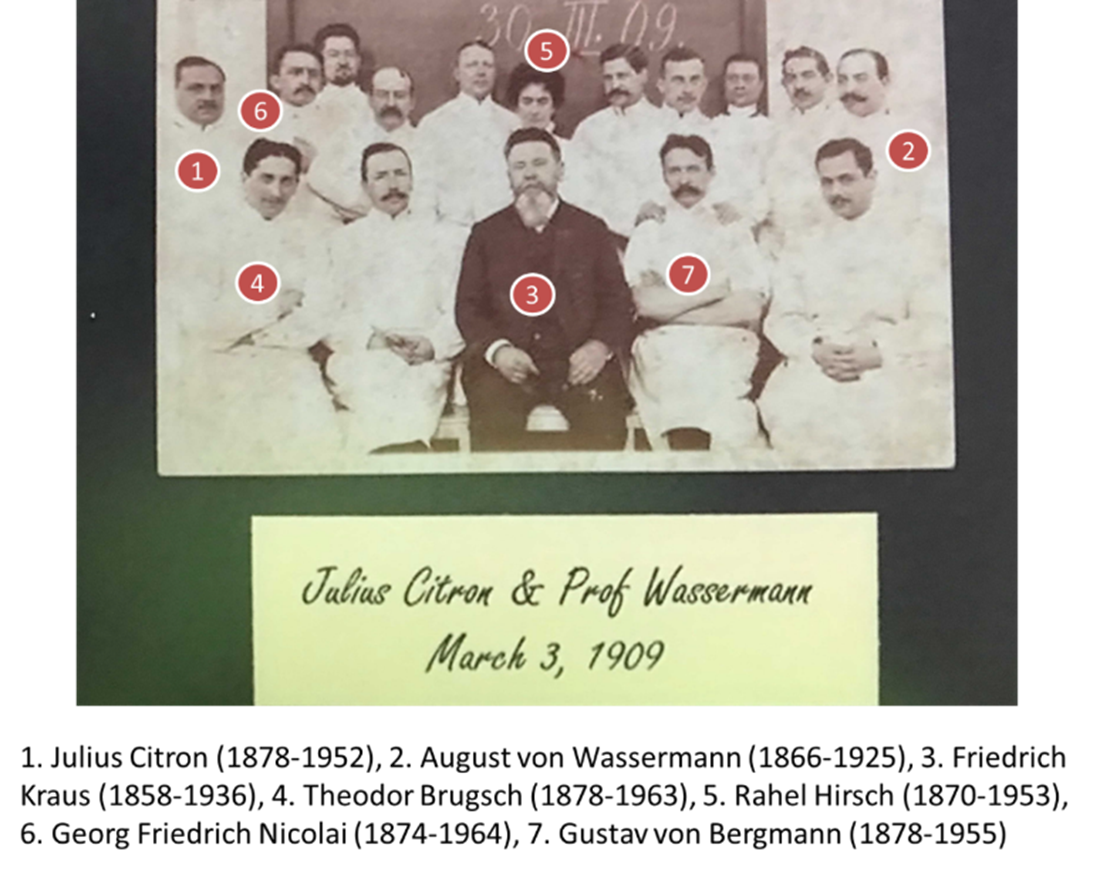
Citron with an historic group of medical researchers at the Charite in 1909. Von Bergmann (No. 7) would follow Kraus as Clinic Director in 1927. In 1933, Von Bergmann would enforce Nazi policy to remove the Jewish staff.

=== Use of insulin in diabetes ===
Shortly after the discovery of insulin in the early 1920s, Citron conducted one of the first clinical trials of its use in treating diabetes in Germany, during a period when the hormone was still difficult to access and experimental.

=== Oral-systemic disease relationships ===
Citron explored the relationship between oral health and systemic illnesses, proposing that dental infections could reflect or affect endocrine and metabolic diseases—a perspective that was uncommon at the time.

== Academic and clinical leadership ==
Citron was appointed Chief of the Bacteriological-Serological Laboratory at the Charité Hospital in Berlin and later became Physician-in-Chief of the 2nd Medical Clinic. He was also a professor of internal medicine at the University of Berlin, where he trained numerous physicians and researchers.

Following the rise of the Nazi regime in 1933, Citron emigrated due to antisemitic persecution. He initially relocated to British Mandatory Palestine, practicing medicine in Tel Aviv.

In 1945, he moved to Cairo, Egypt, where he was appointed Physician-in-Chief at the L’Hôpital Israélite du Caire (Jewish Hospital of Cairo). He served in this capacity until his death in 1952.

== Major published works ==
- Wassermann, A. von, and Julius Citron. "The local immunity of tissues." German med. Wochenschrift 15 (1905).
- Wassermann, A., and Citron, J., ‘Ueber die Bildungsstatten der Typhusimmunkorper. Ein Beitrag zur Frage der localen Im¬ munitat der Gewebe, Ztschr.f. Hyg. u. Infektionskrankh., 1905
- Citron, Julius. "Die Immunisirung gegen Schweineseuche mit Hülfe von Bakterienextracten." Zeitschrift für Hygiene und Infektionskrankheiten 52.1 (1906): 238-262.
- Citron, Julius. "Die Immunisierung gegen die Bakterien der Hogcholera (Schweinepest) mit Hilfe von Bakterienextrakten." Zeitschrift für Hygiene und Infektionskrankheiten 53.1 (1906): 515-553.
- Citron, Julius, “Ueber naturliche und kiinstliche Agressine," Zentralbl. Bakter., 41 (1906), 230
- Citron, Julius. "Ueber Komplementbindungsversuche bei infektiösen und postinfektiösen Erkrankungen,(Tabes dorsalis etc.) sowie bei Nährstoffen1." DMW-Deutsche Medizinische Wochenschrift 33.29 (1907): 1165-1171.
- Citron, Julius Bernhard. On tuberculosis antibodies and the nature of the tuberculin reaction. (1907).
- Citron, J. Erwiderung auf die Bemerkungen E. Weils. Deutsche Medizinische Wochenschrift 33 (43) 1907: 90–91.
- Citron, J. Die Serodiagnostik der Syphilis. Berliner klinische Wochenschrift 44 (43) 1907: 1370–73
- Citron, Julius Bernhard. Klinische Bakteriologie und Protozoenkunde. Klinkhardt, 1908.
- Citron, Julius, and Fritz Munk. "Das Wesen der Wassermannschen Reaktion." DMW-Deutsche Medizinische Wochenschrift 36.34 (1910): 1560-1561.
- Aronsohn, Eduard, and Julius Citron. Experimentelle Untersuchungen über die Bedeutung der Wärmestichhyperthermie für die Antikörperbildung. Hirschwald, 1910.
- Citron, Julius. Die methoden der immunodiagnostik und immunotherapie und ihre praktische verwertung. G. Thieme, 1910.
- Citron, Julius Bernhard. Clinical bacteriology and protozoa. Klinkhardt, 1912
- Citron, Julius. Die methoden der immunodiagnostik und immunotherapie und ihre praktische verwertung. G. Thieme, 1912.
- Citron, Julius, and Erich Leschke. "Ueber den einfluss der ausschaltung des zwischenhirns auf das infectiöse und nichtinfectiöse fieber." Zeitschrift für experimentelle Pathologie und Therapie 14.3 (1913): 379-390.
- Citron, Julius Bernhard. Immunity, Methods of Diagnosis and Therapy and Their Practical Application. P. Blakiston's son & Company, 1914.
- Citron, Julius. "Das klinische Bild der spanischen Grippe." Vortrag Berliner medizinische Gesellschaft 17 (1918).
- Citron, Julius Bernhard. "Die Syphilis" (in the edition of the Specialist Pathol Ther. KRAUS / BRUGSCH, vol. 2,1), Berlin 1919
- Citron, Julius. "Die erfolgreiche Behandlung eines Falles von Gonokokkensepsis mit Meningokokkenserum1." DMW-Deutsche Medizinische Wochenschrift 47.31 (1921): 891-891.
- Citron, J. "Experimented Beitrage zur Insulinwirkung." Med. Klin 20 (1924): 1362-1365.[i]
- Citron, Julius Bernhard. “Paradentoses as a symptom of endocrine and metabolic disorders,” Z. klin. Med, 1928
- Citron, Julius Bernhard. “Significance of oral diseases for internal medicine " (Med. Welt 4: 466-71, 1930)

== Personal life ==
Citron married Lilli Alice Schayer in 1919. They had three children: Ralph, Herbert, and Evelyn. He died in Cairo in 1952 and was buried in the Bassatine Jewish Cemetery.

== See also ==
- Wassermann test
- Charité
- Robert Koch Institute
