= Tropical disease =

Disease prevalent in or unique to tropical and subtropical regions

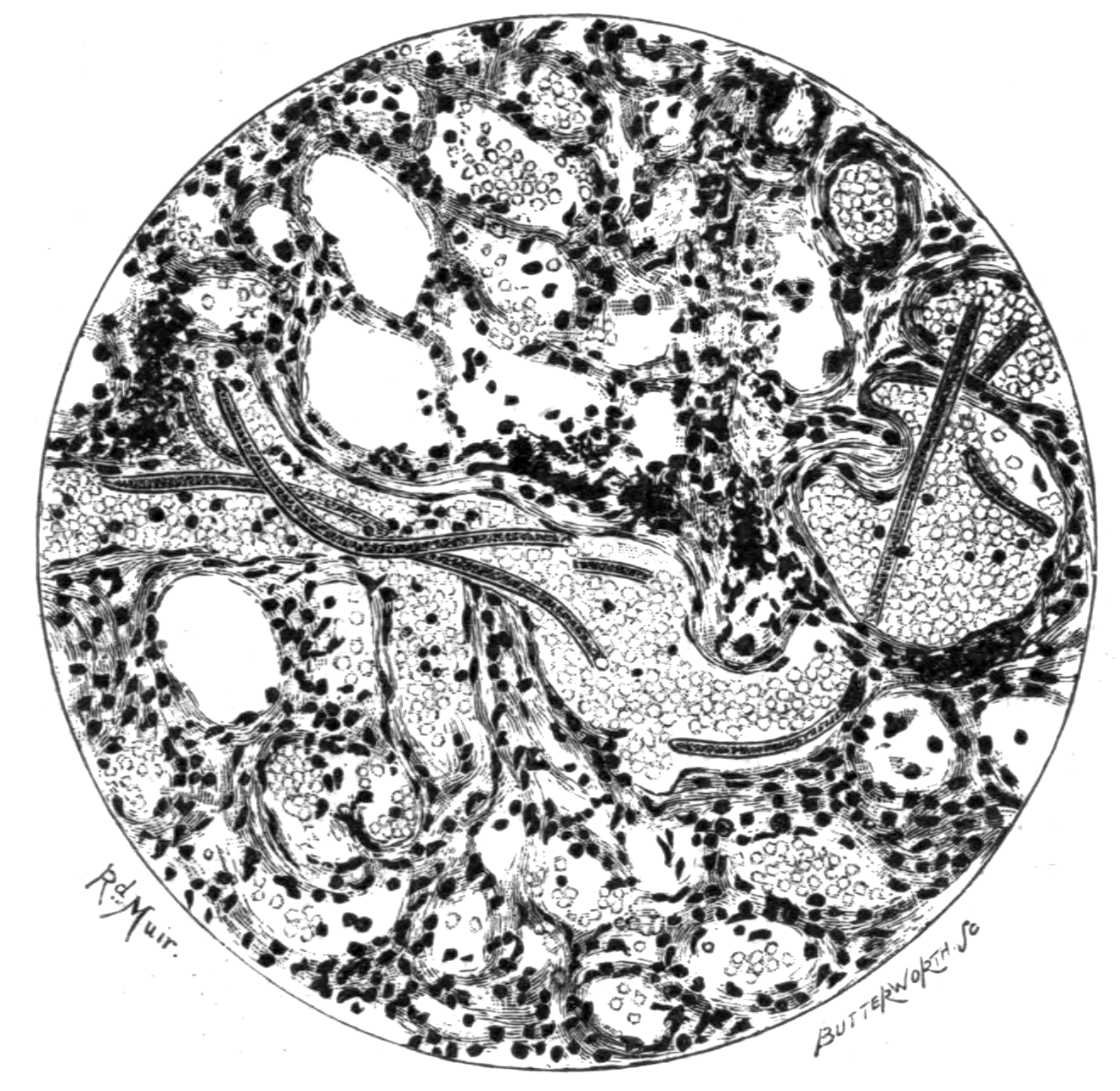
Section of lung showing parasitic nematode microfilariæ in the blood-vessels.

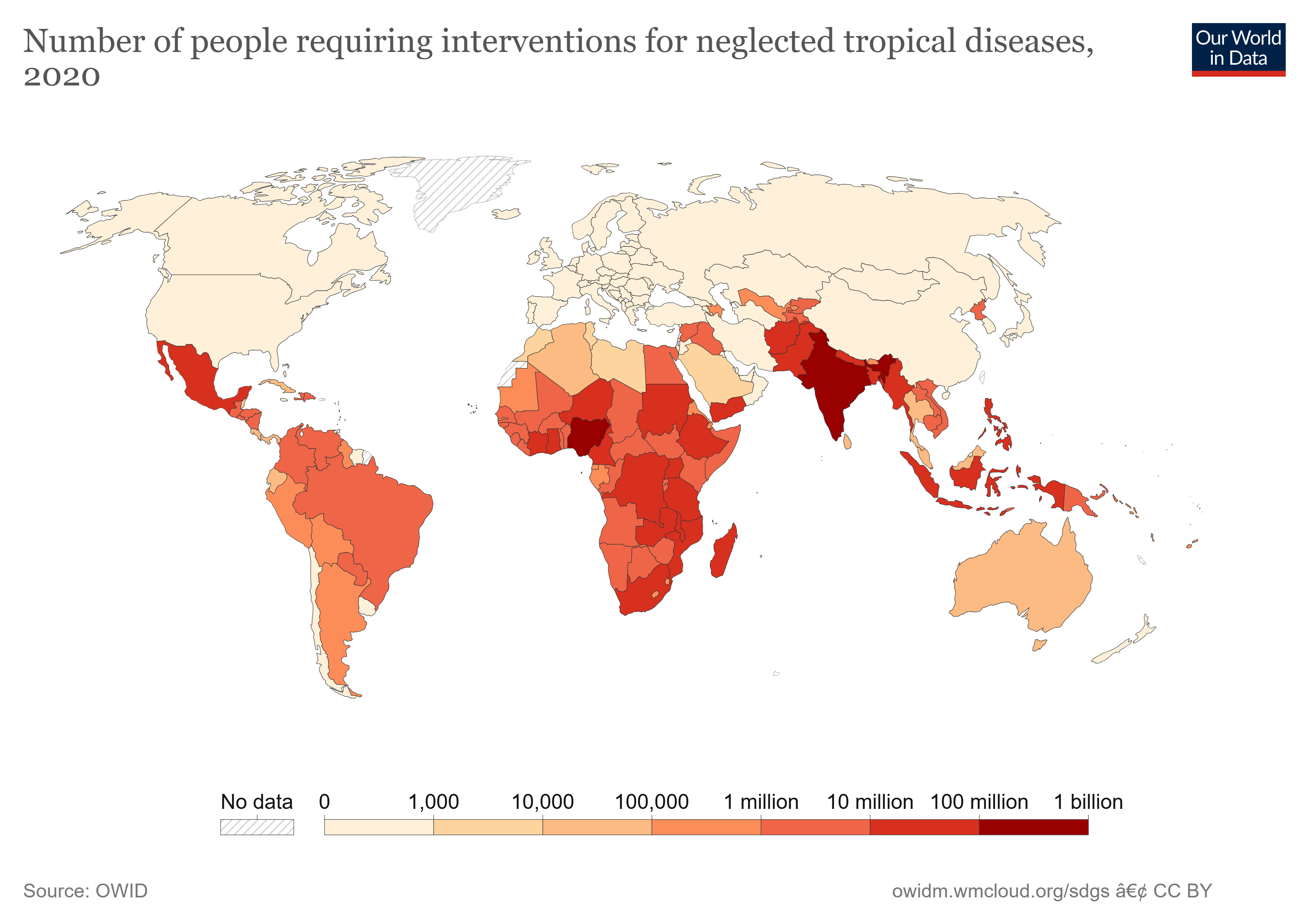
Number of people requiring interventions for neglected tropical diseases.

Tropical diseases are infectious diseases that are prevalent in or unique to tropical and subtropical regions. The diseases are less prevalent in temperate climates, due in part to the occurrence of a cold season, which controls the insect population by forcing hibernation. However, many were present in Northern Europe and Northern America in the 17th and 18th centuries before modern understanding of disease causation. The initial impetus for tropical medicine was to protect the health of colonial settlers, notably in India under the British Raj. Insects such as mosquitoes and flies are by far the most common disease carrier, or vector. These insects may carry a parasite, bacterium or virus that is infectious to humans and animals. Most often disease is transmitted by an insect bite, which causes transmission of the infectious agent through subcutaneous blood exchange. Vaccines are not available for most of the diseases listed here, and many do not have cures.

Human exploration of tropical rainforests, deforestation, rising immigration and increased international air travel and other tourism to tropical regions has led to an increased incidence of such diseases to non-tropical countries. Of particular concern is the habitat loss of reservoir host species.

== Health programmes ==
In 1975 the Special Programme for Research and Training in Tropical Diseases (TDR) was established to focus on neglected infectious diseases which disproportionately affect poor and marginalized populations in developing regions of Africa, Asia, Central America and North South America. It was established at the World Health Organization, which is the executing agency, and is co-sponsored by the United Nations Children's Fund, United Nations Development Programme, the World Bank and the World Health Organization.

TDR's vision is to foster an effective global research effort on infectious diseases of poverty in which disease endemic countries play a pivotal role. It has a dual mission of developing new tools and strategies against these diseases, and to develop the research and leadership capacity in the countries where the diseases occur. The TDR secretariat is based in Geneva, Switzerland, but the work is conducted throughout the world through many partners and funded grants.

Some examples of work include helping to develop new treatments for diseases, such as ivermectin for onchocerciasis (river blindness); showing how packaging can improve use of artemesinin-combination treatment (ACT) for malaria; demonstrating the effectiveness of bednets to prevent mosquito bites and malaria; and documenting how community-based and community-led programmes increases distribution of multiple treatments. TDR history

The current TDR disease portfolio includes the following entries:

Historical TDR disease portfolio
Disease	When added	Pathogen	Primary vector	Primary endemic areas	Frequency	Annual deaths	Symptoms	Complications
Malaria	1975	Plasmodium falciparum and four other Plasmodium species of protozoa	Anopheles mosquitoes	throughout the tropics	241 million (2024)	627,000 (2024)	fever, tiredness, vomiting, headache	yellow skin, seizures, coma, death
Schistosomiasis /ˌʃɪstəsəˈmaɪəsɪs/ (snail fever, bilharzia, "schisto")	1975	Schistosoma flatworms (blood flukes)	freshwater snails	throughout the tropics	252 million (2021)	11,792 (2021)	abdominal pain, diarrhea, bloody stool, blood in the urine. In children, it may cause poor growth and learning difficulty.	Liver damage, kidney failure, infertility, bladder cancer
Lymphatic filariasis	1975	Wuchereria bancrofti, Brugia malayi, and Brugia timori filarial worms	mosquitoes	throughout the tropics	38.5 million (2015)	few		lymphoedema, elephantiasis, hydrocele
Onchocerciasis /ˌɒŋkoʊsɜːrˈkaɪəsɪs, -ˈsaɪ-/ (river blindness)	1975	Onchocerca volvulus filarial worms	Simuliidae black flies	sub-Saharan Africa	15.5 million (2015)	0	itching, papules	edema, lymphadenopathy, visual impairment, blindness
Chagas disease (American trypanosomiasis)	1975	Trypanosoma cruzi protozoa	Triatominae kissing bugs	South America	6.2 million (2017)	7,900 (2017)	fever, swollen lymph nodes, headache	heart failure, enlarged esophagus, enlarged colon
African trypanosomiasis (sleeping sickness)	1975	Trypanosoma brucei gambiense and T. b. rhodesiense protozoa	Glossina tsetse flies	sub-Saharan Africa	11,000 (2015)	3,500 (2015)	first stage: fever, headache, itchiness, joint pain second stage: insomnia, confusion, ataxia, hemiparesis, paralysis	anemia, endocrine disfunction, cardiac disfunction, kidney dysfunction, coma, death
Leishmaniasis	1975	Leishmania protozoa	Phlebotominae sandflies	throughout the tropics	4–12 million	24,200 (2015)	skin ulcers	fever, anemia, enlarged liver, enlarged spleen, death
Leprosy^{†} (Hansen's disease)	1975	Mycobacterium leprae and M. lepromatosis mycobacteria	extensive contact (probably airborne disease)	throughout the tropics	209,000 (2018)	few	skin lesions, numbness	permanent damage to the skin, nerves, limbs, and eyes
Dengue fever	1999	dengue virus	Aedes aegypti and other Aedes mosquitoes	tropical Asia	390 million (2020)	40,000	fever, headache, muscle and joint pain, rash, vomiting, diarrhea	low levels of blood platelets, hypotension, hemorrhage, shock
Tuberculosis^{†} (TB, consumption)	1999	Mycobacterium tuberculosis mycobacteria	airborne disease	worldwide	10 million (active, 2018), 2 billion (latent, 2018)	1.5 million (2018)	chronic cough, fever, cough with bloody mucus, weight loss	death
TB-HIV coinfection^{‡}	1999	HIV + Mycobacterium tuberculosis	sexual contact + airborne disease	Africa	1.2 million (2015)	251,000 (2018)		
Sexually transmitted infections (notably syphilis, gonorrhoea, chlamydia, trichomoniasis, hepatitis B, HSV, HIV, and HPV)	2000	bacteria, parasite, viruses	sexual contact	worldwide			various	various

^{†} Although leprosy and tuberculosis are not exclusively tropical diseases, their high incidence in the tropics justifies their inclusion.
^{‡} People living with HIV are 19 (15–22) times more likely to develop active TB disease than people without HIV.

== Other neglected tropical diseases ==
Additional neglected tropical diseases include:

Disease	Causative Agent	Comments
Hookworm	Ancylostoma duodenale and Necator americanus	
Trichuriasis	Trichuris trichiura	
Treponematoses	Treponema pallidum pertenue, Treponema pallidum endemicum, Treponema pallidum carateum, Treponema pallidum pallidum	
Buruli ulcer	Mycobacterium ulcerans	
Dracunculiasis	Dracunculus medinensis	
Leptospirosis	Leptospira	
Strongyloidiasis	Strongyloides stercoralis	
Foodborne trematodiases	Trematoda	
Neurocysticercosis	Taenia solium	
Scabies	Sarcoptes scabiei	
Flavivirus Infections	Yellow fever virus, West Nile virus, dengue virus, Tick-borne encephalitis virus, Zika virus	

Some tropical diseases are very rare, but may occur in sudden epidemics, such as the Ebola hemorrhagic fever, Lassa fever and the Marburg virus. There are hundreds of different tropical diseases which are less known or rarer, but that, nonetheless, have importance for public health.

== Relation of climate to tropical diseases ==
The so-called "exotic" diseases in the tropics have long been noted both by travelers, explorers, etc., as well as by physicians. One obvious reason is that the hot climate present during all the year and the larger volume of rains directly affect the formation of breeding grounds, the larger number and variety of natural reservoirs and animal diseases that can be transmitted to humans (zoonosis), the largest number of possible insect vectors of diseases. It is possible also that higher temperatures may favor the replication of pathogenic agents both inside and outside biological organisms. Socio-economic factors may be also in operation, since most of the poorest nations of the world are in the tropics. Tropical countries like Brazil, which have improved their socio-economic situation and invested in hygiene, public health and the combat of transmissible diseases have achieved dramatic results in relation to the elimination or decrease of many endemic tropical diseases in their territory.

Climate change, global warming caused by the greenhouse effect, and the resulting increase in global temperatures, are possibly causing tropical diseases and vectors to spread to higher altitudes in mountainous regions, and to higher latitudes that were previously spared, such as the Southern United States, the Mediterranean area, etc. For example, in the Monteverde cloud forest of Costa Rica, global warming enabled Chytridiomycosis, a tropical disease, to flourish and thus force into decline amphibian populations of the Monteverde Harlequin frog. Here, global warming raised the heights of orographic cloud formation, and thus produced cloud cover that would facilitate optimum growth conditions for the implicated pathogen, B. dendrobatidis.

=== Role of human activities in the spread of tropical diseases ===
Human activities, particularly those driving climate change, are significantly influencing the spread and geographical range of tropical diseases. The burning of fossil fuels, deforestation, industrial agriculture, and urbanization release large amounts of greenhouse gases into the atmosphere, raising global temperatures and altering weather patterns. These environmental changes, such as increased rainfall, higher temperatures, and more frequent extreme weather events, create more favorable conditions for disease vectors like mosquitoes, which transmit diseases such as malaria, dengue, and Zika. In many cases, this has expanded the reach of tropical diseases into regions that were previously unaffected, including higher altitudes and temperate zones. Additionally, human-driven habitat destruction, such as the clearing of forests and wetlands, disrupts natural reservoirs and increases human-wildlife contact, further elevating the risk of zoonotic diseases crossing into human populations. As climate change continues, these activities will likely exacerbate the public health burden, especially in low-income regions that are most vulnerable to both the impacts of climate change and the diseases it helps spread.

== Prevention and treatment ==
Disability-adjusted life year for tropical diseases per 100,000 inhabitants. These include trypanosomiasis, chagas disease, schistosomiasis, leishmaniasis, lymphatic filariasis, onchocerciasis. no data ≤100 100–200 200–300 300–400 400–500 500–600 600–700 700–800 800–900 900–1000 1000–1500 ≥1500

=== Vector-borne diseases ===
Vectors are living organisms that pass disease between humans or from animal to human. The vector carrying the highest number of diseases is the mosquito, which is responsible for the tropical diseases dengue and malaria. Many different approaches have been taken to treat and prevent these diseases. NIH-funded research has produced genetically modify mosquitoes that are unable to spread diseases such as malaria. An issue with this approach is global accessibility to genetic engineering technology; Approximately 50% of scientists in the field do not have access to information on genetically modified mosquito trials being conducted.

Other prevention methods include:

- Draining wetlands to reduce populations of insects and other vectors, or introducing natural predators of the vectors.
- The application of insecticides and/or insect repellents to strategic surfaces such as clothing, skin, buildings, insect habitats, and bed nets.
- The use of a mosquito net over a bed (also known as a "bed net") to reduce nighttime transmission, since certain species of tropical mosquitoes feed mainly at night.

=== Community approaches ===
Assisting with economic development in endemic regions can contribute to prevention and treatment of tropical diseases. For example, microloans enable communities to invest in health programs that lead to more effective disease treatment and prevention technology.

Educational campaigns can aid in the prevention of various diseases. Educating children about how diseases spread and how they can be prevented has proven to be effective in practicing preventative measures. Educational campaigns can yield significant benefits at low costs.

=== Innovative approaches ===
Recent advancements in vector control technologies are proving effective in reducing the transmission of mosquito-borne diseases like malaria, dengue, and Zika. Genetically modified (GM) mosquitoes, such as Oxitec's mosquitoes, which prevent females from surviving to adulthood, have demonstrated over a 90% reduction in mosquito populations in field trials in Brazil.

Another promising approach is the use of Wolbachia bacteria, which renders mosquitoes resistant to the dengue virus. A trial in Yogyakarta, Indonesia, showed a 77% reduction in symptomatic dengue cases in areas with Wolbachia-infected mosquitoes.

Additionally, integrated vector management (IVM), which combines biological controls, insecticides, and public education, has proven successful in reducing the transmission of arboviruses. These strategies offer more sustainable and eco-friendly solutions for controlling mosquito populations and preventing disease spread.

=== Other approaches ===
- Use of water wells, and/or water filtration, water filters, or water treatment with water tablets to produce drinking water free of parasites.
- Sanitation to prevent transmission through human waste.
- Development and use of vaccines to promote disease immunity.
- Pharmacologic treatment (to treat disease after infection or infestation).

== See also ==
- European Bioinformatics Institute
- Hospital for Tropical Diseases
- Tropical medicine
- Infectious disease
- Neglected diseases
- List of epidemics
- Waterborne diseases
- Globalization and disease
- Climate change and infectious diseases
