= TPPA =

TPPA may refer to:

- Trans-Pacific Partnership Agreement, a trade agreement
- Treponema pallidum particle agglutination assay, a test for the causative agent of syphilis
- Tripyrrolidinophosphoric acid triamide
