= Premarital medical examination =

Mandated exams in some jurisdictions

Beginning in the early 20th century, a number of U.S. states passed laws mandating medical examinations for one or both parties before marriage. The most common requirement was a blood test for syphilis, though other diseases such as gonorrhea and rubella were sometimes also targeted. If a partner tested positive, they would generally be required to undergo treatment before they could receive a marriage license.

Such laws were once widespread in the United States, with all but eight states requiring premarital blood tests by 1954. Mandatory testing was also in effect in parts of Canada, and some European nations such as Sweden. Most of these laws were repealed by the late 20th or early 21st century.

== Tests ==
=== Syphilis ===
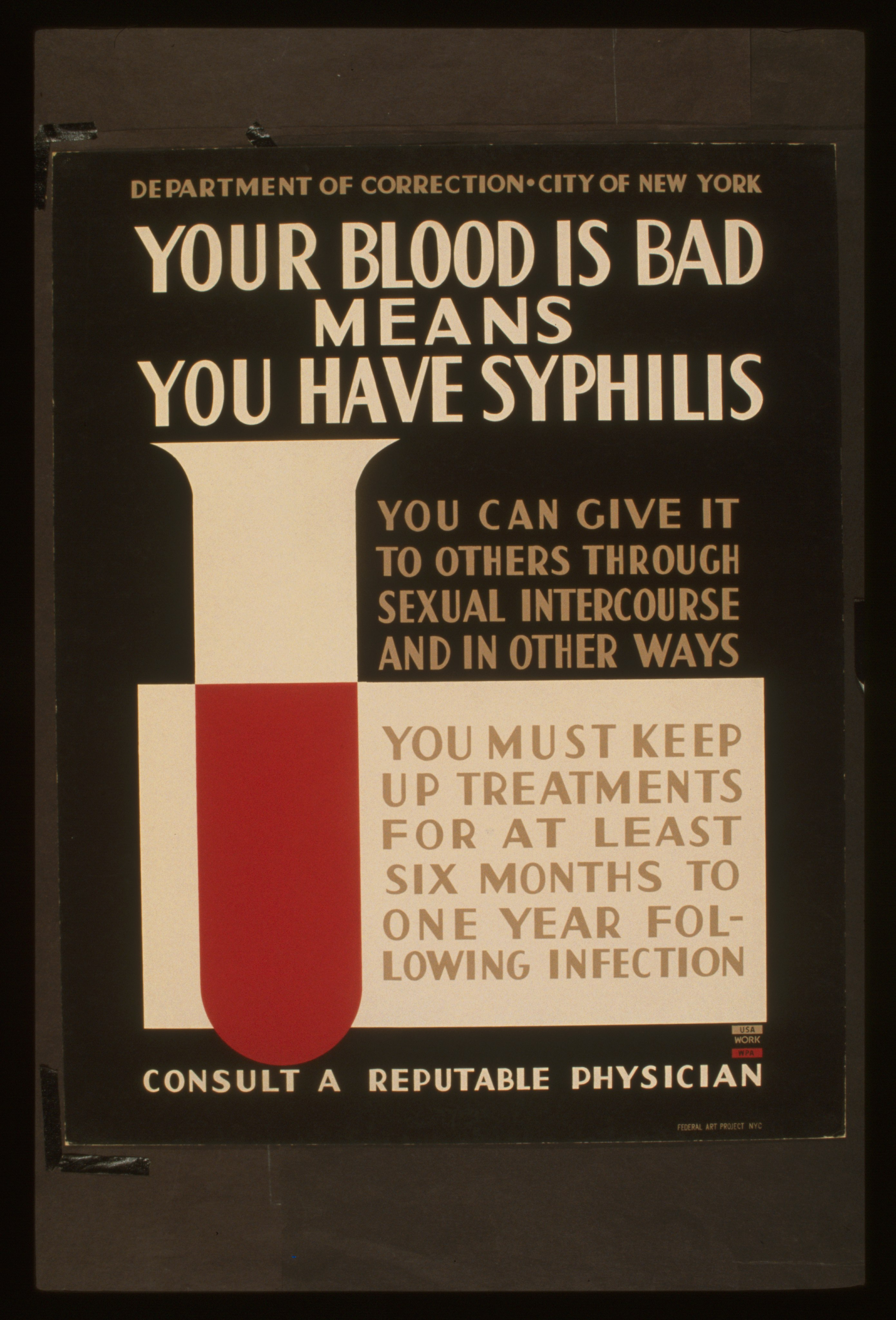
A poster from 1938. Prior to the availability of penicillin in the 1940s, syphilis required continuous treatment over the course of up to a year or more.

Syphilis was the disease most commonly targeted by premarital examination laws. Syphilis was relatively widespread in the first half of the twentieth century, estimated to affect more than 10% of Americans during their lifetime, with many of those afflicted unaware that they were carrying the disease. Because syphilis could be transmitted from mother to child, and cause birth defects, detecting the presence of the disease prior to marriage (and the subsequent production of offspring) was seen as a beneficial public health measure.

The most common blood test for syphilis was the Wassermann test, developed in 1906 by August von Wassermann, though results of the alternative Kahn test were also usually accepted.

If a partner tested positive, they would generally be required to undergo a course of treatment until a doctor was satisfied that the infection was resolved. Before the introduction of penicillin as an effective single-dose treatment in the 1940s, patients were treated with arsenic-based drugs such as Arsphenamine which took a year or more to clear the infection.

=== HIV ===
Beginning in the 1980s, a number of national and subnational governments have implemented or considered implementing mandatory HIV testing prior to marriage. As of 2010, regions with such laws in effect included Bahrain, Heilongjiang and Yunnan provinces of China, Libya, Saudi Arabia, the United Arab Emirates, and Uzbekistan.

In the United States, more than thirty states considered premarital HIV testing laws in the 1980s, with Illinois and Louisiana briefly enacting mandatory testing statutes. Only a small number of statutes under consideration would have barred the issuance of a marriage license in the case of a positive test.

In some areas, premarital HIV tests are mandated by local churches, such as the Church of Uganda, the Baptist Community of Congo, the Catholic Church of Burundi, and certain churches in Kenya and Nigeria.

=== Other conditions ===
Other conditions which have been the subject of mandatory premarital testing include:

- Genetic conditions
- Gonorrhea
- Rubella

== United States ==
=== Prior to 1935 ===
As early as 1913, a number of US states had laws in effect concerning marriage and venereal disease, though many targeted only the husband and not the wife. For example, in Alabama, North Dakota, Oregon and Wisconsin, male applicants for a marriage license were required to submit a medical certificate stating that they were free of venereal disease. Other states, including Indiana, Michigan, New Jersey, Oklahoma, and Vermont, forbade a person having a venereal disease from marrying, but had no measures in place for enforcing this. In total, 25 states passed some form of early "eugenic marriage laws", though only a minority required a blood test.

=== 1935–1950s ===
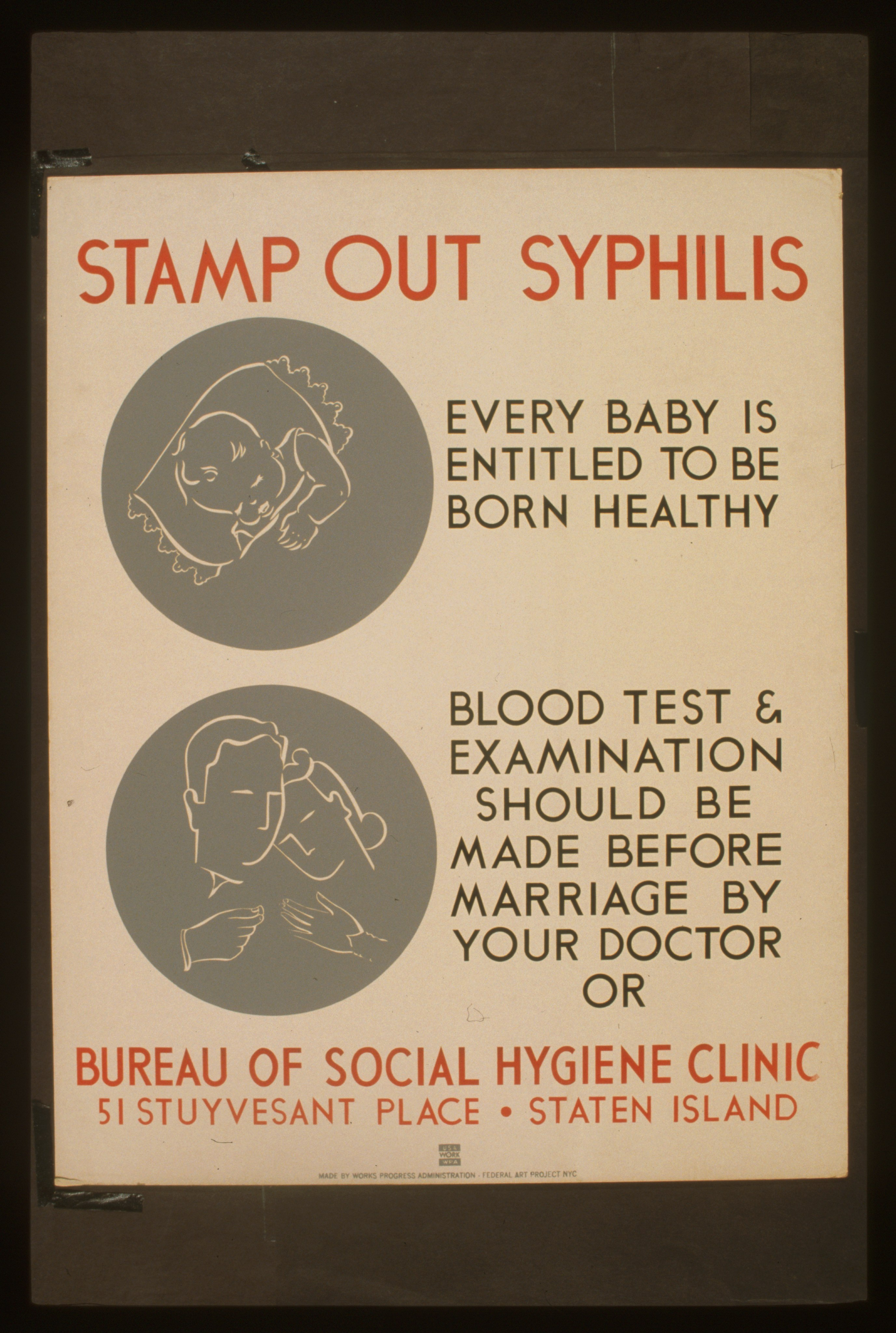
A poster encouraging premarital syphilis blood tests, created shortly before New York state began mandating premarital testing in July 1938.

A wave of more effective laws requiring blood tests for both partners were passed by state legislatures between 1935 and 1950, beginning with Connecticut's "premarital examination law", which served as a model for other states. The Connecticut law required both parties undergo a blood test for syphilis and a physical examination.

The spread of these laws was abetted by Surgeon General Thomas Parran, who, during this period, embarked on a public health campaign to reduce syphilis rates and inform the public about the disease. Premarital blood testing requirements were also supported by the American eugenics movement, which regarded them as one measure to prevent reproduction of the unfit.

In 1937, five states passed premarital examination laws similar to that of Connecticut, with a further twelve states doing the same from 1938 to 1939. By 1954, all but eight states and the District of Columbia required premarital blood tests.

The laws were very popular with the American public. For example, in a 1944 survey of readers of Woman's Home Companion, 98% of respondents answered yes to the question "Would you approve a national law which would require premarital blood tests to check venereal disease?".

=== Repeals ===
American premarital examination laws were gradually repealed between the 1970s and early 2000s. The primary reason cited for these repeals was that testing was no longer cost-effective given the low prevalence of syphilis.

The first state to repeal its premarital examination law was Maine in 1972. Most had been repealed by the early 2000s, with Mississippi being the last in 2012.
