= Nontreponemal tests for syphilis =

Diagnostic technique

- Purpose: test for syphilis

A nontreponemal test (NTT) is a blood test for diagnosis of infection with syphilis. Nontreponemal tests are an indirect method in that they detect biomarkers that are released during cellular damage that occurs from the syphilis spirochete. In contrast, treponemal tests look for antibodies that are a direct result of the infection thus, anti-treponeme IgG, IgM and to a lesser degree IgA. Nontreponemal tests are screening tests, very rapid and relatively simple, but need to be confirmed by treponemal tests. Centers for Disease Control and Prevention (CDC)-approved standard tests include the VDRL test (a slide test), the rapid plasma reagin (RPR) test (a card test), the unheated serum reagin (USR) test, and the toluidine red unheated serum test (TRUST). These have mostly replaced the first nontreponemal test, the Wassermann test.

== Nontreponemal tests ==
Syphilitic infection leads to the production of nonspecific antibodies that react to cardiolipin. This reaction is the foundation of “nontreponemal” assays such as the VDRL (Venereal Disease Research Laboratory) test and Rapid Plasma Reagin (RPR) test. Both these test are flocculation type tests that use an antigen-antibody interaction. The complexes remain suspended in solution and therefore visible due to the lipid based antigens.

All nontreponemal tests measure immunoglobulins G (IgG) and M (IgM) anti-lipid antibodies formed by the host in response both to lipoidal material released from damaged host cells early in infection and to lipid from the cell surfaces of the treponeme itself.

These nontreponemal tests are widely used for qualitative syphilis screening. However, their usefulness is limited by decreased sensitivity in early primary syphilis and during late syphilis, when a large number of untreated patients will be negative by these methods.

With nontreponemal tests, false-positive reactions can occur for a large number of reasons, the most common of which is other infections, both viral and bacterial. Additionally these tests may show false-negative when the patient's antibody titer is very high due to a hook effect (also called a prozone effect). Because of the issues with false positives, confirmation with a second treponemal test that is specific for Treponema pallidum antibodies is recommended.

The tests are relatively simple to perform and interpret, and can allow rapid return of results and are very cheap. However, they still require some laboratory equipment (especially the VDRL) and trained personnel to perform and interpret test reactions.
