= Jules Bordet =

Belgian scientist and Nobel laureate (1870–1961)

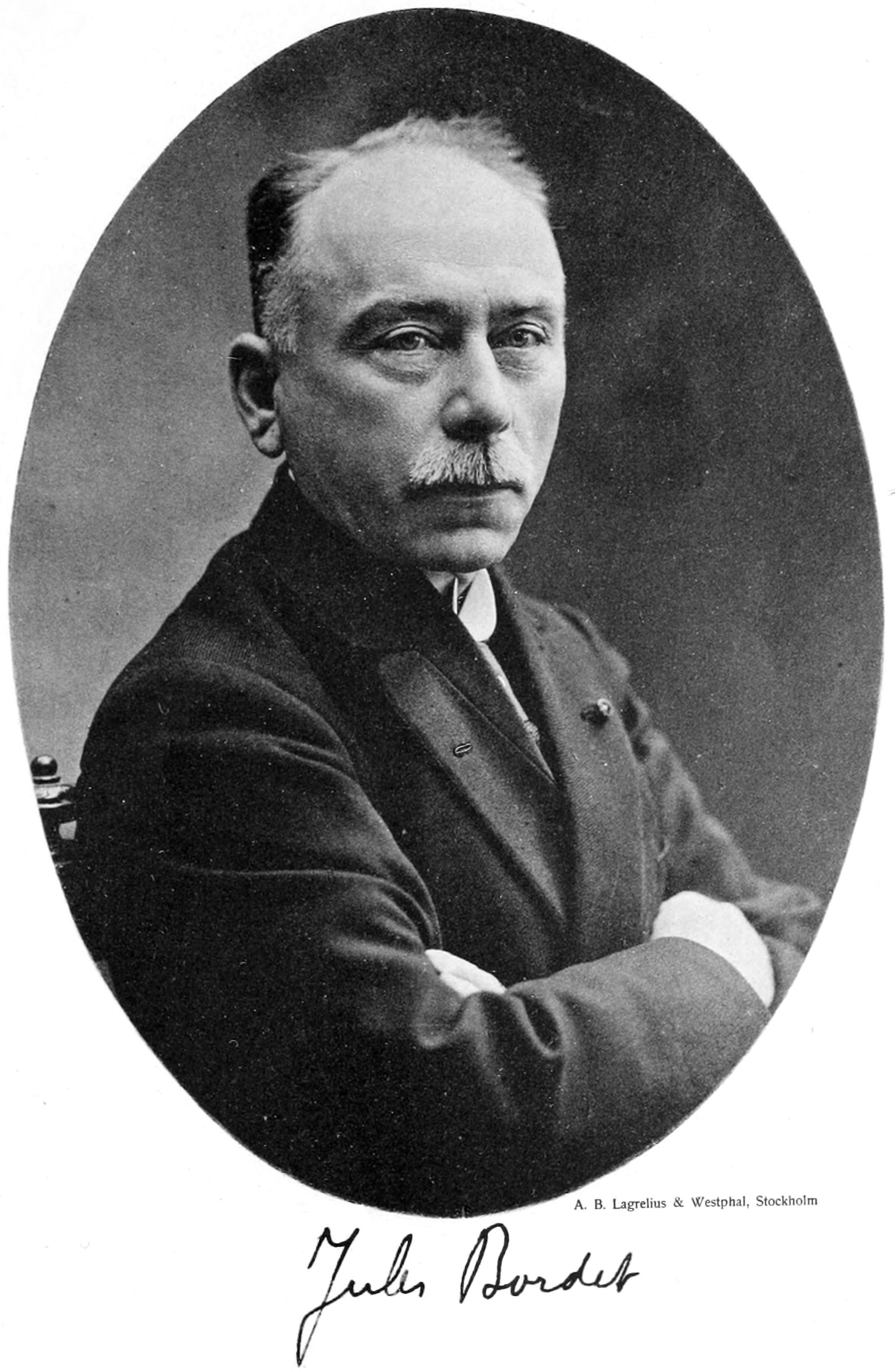
- Born: Jules Jean Baptiste Vincent Bordet; 13 June 1870; Soignies, Belgium
- Died: 6 April 1961 (aged 90); Brussels, Belgium
- Resting place: Ixelles Cemetery, Brussels
- Education: Free University of Brussels
- Awards: Nobel Prize in Physiology or Medicine (1919); Cameron Prize for Therapeutics of the University of Edinburgh (1921)

Jules Jean Baptiste Vincent Bordet (/bɔːrˈdeɪ/ bor-DAY, French: [ʒyl ʒɑ̃ batist vɛ̃sɑ̃ bɔʁdɛ]; 13 June 1870 – 6 April 1961) was a Belgian immunologist and microbiologist. The bacterial genus Bordetella is named after him. The Nobel Prize in Physiology or Medicine was awarded to him in 1919 for his discoveries relating to immunity.

== Education and early life ==
Bordet was born at Soignies, Belgium. He graduated as Doctor of Medicine from the Free University of Brussels in 1892 and began his work at the Pasteur Institute in Paris in 1894, in the laboratory of Elie Metchnikoff, who had just discovered phagocytosis of bacteria by white blood cells, an expression of cellular immunity.

== Career ==
In 1895 Bordet made his discovery that the bacteriolytic effect of acquired specific antibody is significantly enhanced in vivo by the presence of innate serum components which he termed alexine (but which are now known as complement). Four years later, in 1899, he described a similar destructive process involving complement, "hemolysis", in which foreign red blood cells are ruptured or "lysed" following exposure to immune serum. In 1900, he left Paris to found an institute in Brussels like Pasteur's, and continued to work extensively on the mechanisms involved in the action of complement. These studies became the basis for complement-fixation testing methods that enabled the development of serological tests for syphilis (specifically, the development of the Wassermann test by August von Wassermann). The same technique is used today in serologic testing for countless other diseases.

With Octave Gengou, he isolated Bordetella pertussis in pure culture in 1906 and posited it as the cause of whooping cough.He became Professor of Bacteriology at the Université libre de Bruxelles in 1907.

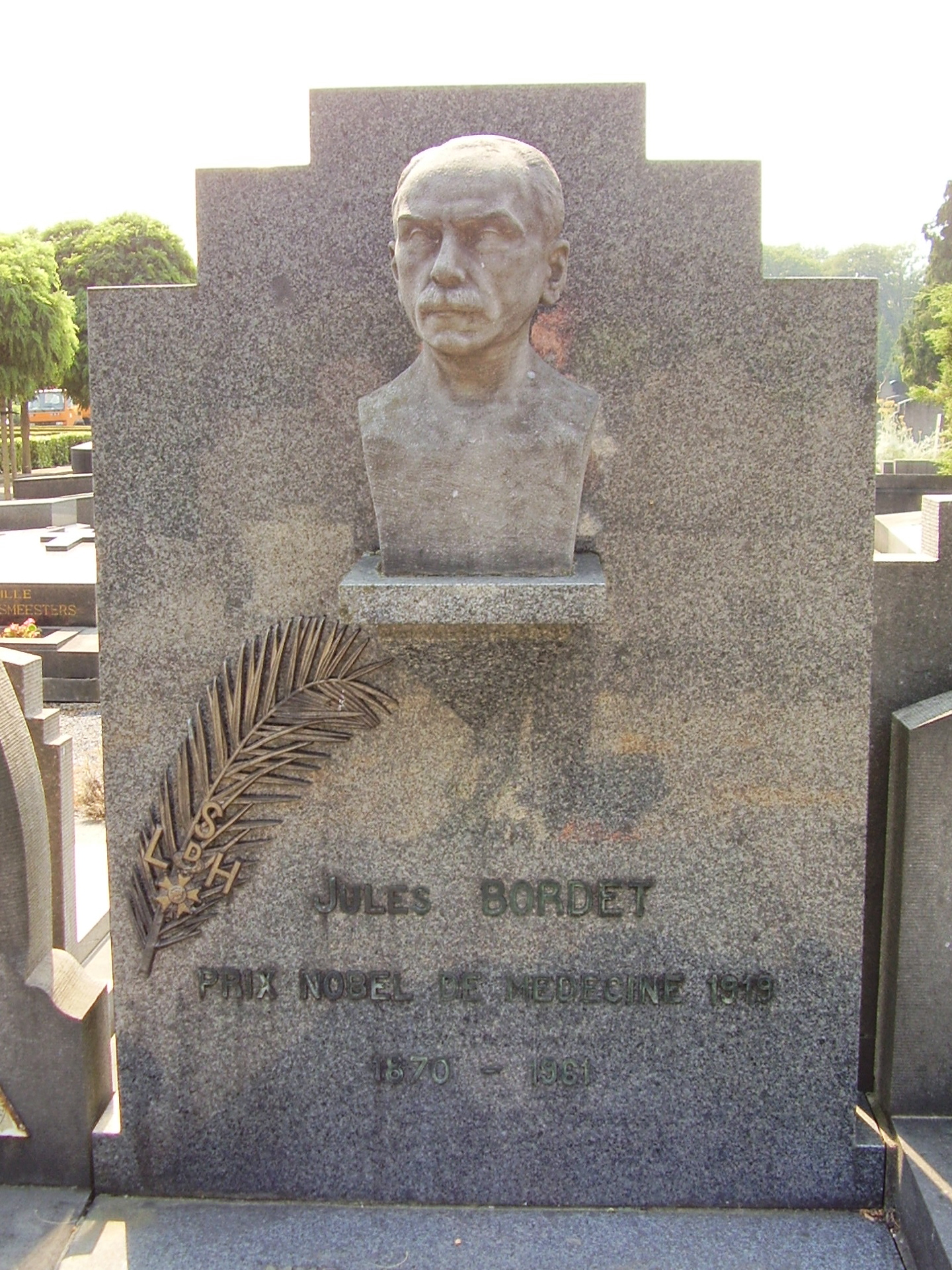
Jules Bordet's grave in Ixelles Cemetery

== Awards and honours ==
In March 1916, he was elected a Foreign Member of the Royal Society and in 1930, delivered their Croonian Lecture. In this lecture, Bordet also concluded that bacteriophages, the bacteria-killing "invisible viruses" discovered by Felix d'Herelle did not exist and that bacteria destroyed themselves using a process of autolysis. This theory collapsed in 1941 with the publication by Ruska of the first electron microscope pictures of bacteriophages. The Nobel Prize in Physiology or Medicine was awarded to him in 1919 for his discoveries relating to immunity.

Bordet died in 1961 and was interred in the Ixelles Cemetery in Brussels.

- 1919: Member of the Royal Academy of Science, Letters and Fine Arts of Belgium.
- 1921: Awarded the Cameron Prize for Therapeutics of the University of Edinburgh.

The Bordet railway station in Brussels is named after him.

The cancer hospital Institut Jules Bordet is also named after him.
