= Venereal Disease Research Laboratory test =

Blood test for syphilis

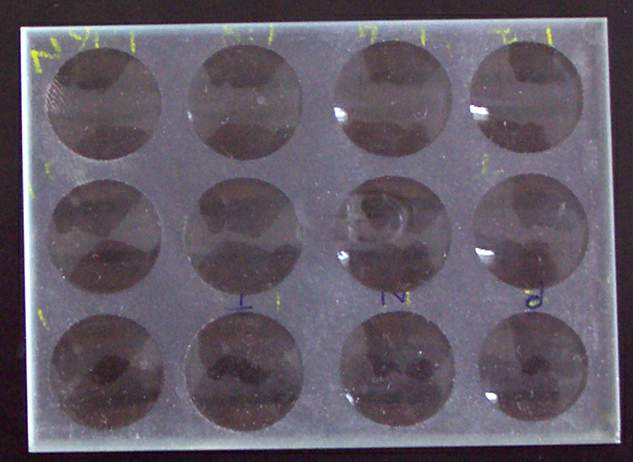
- VDRL slide for performing the blood test for syphilis
- Purpose: blood test for syphilis

The Venereal Disease Research Laboratory test (VDRL) is a blood test for syphilis and related non-venereal treponematoses that was developed by the eponymous US laboratory. The VDRL test is used to screen for syphilis (it has high sensitivity), whereas other, more specific tests are used to diagnose the disease.

== History ==
The VDRL type test was invented before World War I, with its first iteration being that developed by August Paul von Wasserman with the aid of Albert Neisser in 1906. The VDRL test, as it is largely still done today, was developed in 1946 by Harris, Rosenberg, and Riedel. The lab was renamed to the Treponemal Pathogenesis and Immunology Branch of the United States Public Health Service.

== Mechanism ==
The VDRL is a nontreponemal serological screening for syphilis that is also used to assess response to therapy, to detect central nervous system involvement, and as an aid in the diagnosis of congenital syphilis. The basis of the test is that an antibody produced by a patient with syphilis reacts with an extract of ox heart (diphosphatidyl glycerol). It therefore detects anti-cardiolipin antibodies (IgG, IgM or IgA), visualized through foaming of the test tube fluid, or "flocculation".

The rapid plasma reagin (RPR) test uses the same antigen as the VDRL, but in that test, it has been bound to several other molecules, including a carbon particle to allow visualization of the flocculation reaction without the need of a microscope. Many other medical conditions can produce false positive results, including some viruses (mononucleosis, hepatitis), drugs, pregnancy, rheumatic fever, rheumatoid arthritis, lupus, and leprosy.

The syphilis anti-cardiolipin antibodies are beta-2 glycoprotein independent, whereas those that occur in antiphospholipid syndrome (associated to lupus for example) are beta-2 glycoprotein dependent, and this can be used to tell them apart in an ELISA assay. This test is very useful as the trend of titres are correlated to disease activity (i.e. falling titres indicate successful treatment). It has a very good sensitivity for syphilis, except in late tertiary form.

== Other tests ==
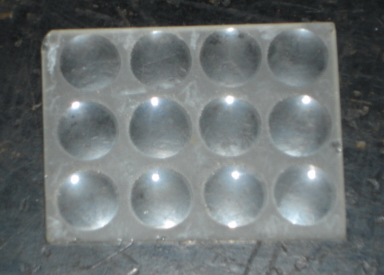
VDRL slides used in India

There are a number of treponemal-specific tests such as the fluorescent treponemal antibody-absorption (FTA-ABS) test, T. pallidum hemagglutination assays (TPHA), and the microhemagglutination assay (MHA-TP).

The MHA-TP is used to confirm a syphilis infection after another method tests positive for the syphilis bacteria. The MHA-TP test detects antibodies to the bacteria that cause syphilis and can be used to detect syphilis in all stages, except during the first 3 to 4 weeks. This test is not done on spinal fluid. The MHA-TP test is rarely used any more. Treponema pallidum particle agglutination assay (TP-PA) and the Toluidine red unheated serum test (TRUST), which may be used to confirm a positive VDRL result, are more specific for syphilis than non-treponemal tests and in the presence of a positive test, more likely indicate active infection. Unfortunately, other treponemal infections such as yaws, bejel, and pinta and possibly nonpathogenic commensal treponemes can result in a positive. Not all these disease are venereal; it has been recommended that a careful explanation of this fact be included with test results.
