= Wassermann test =

Antibody test for syphilis

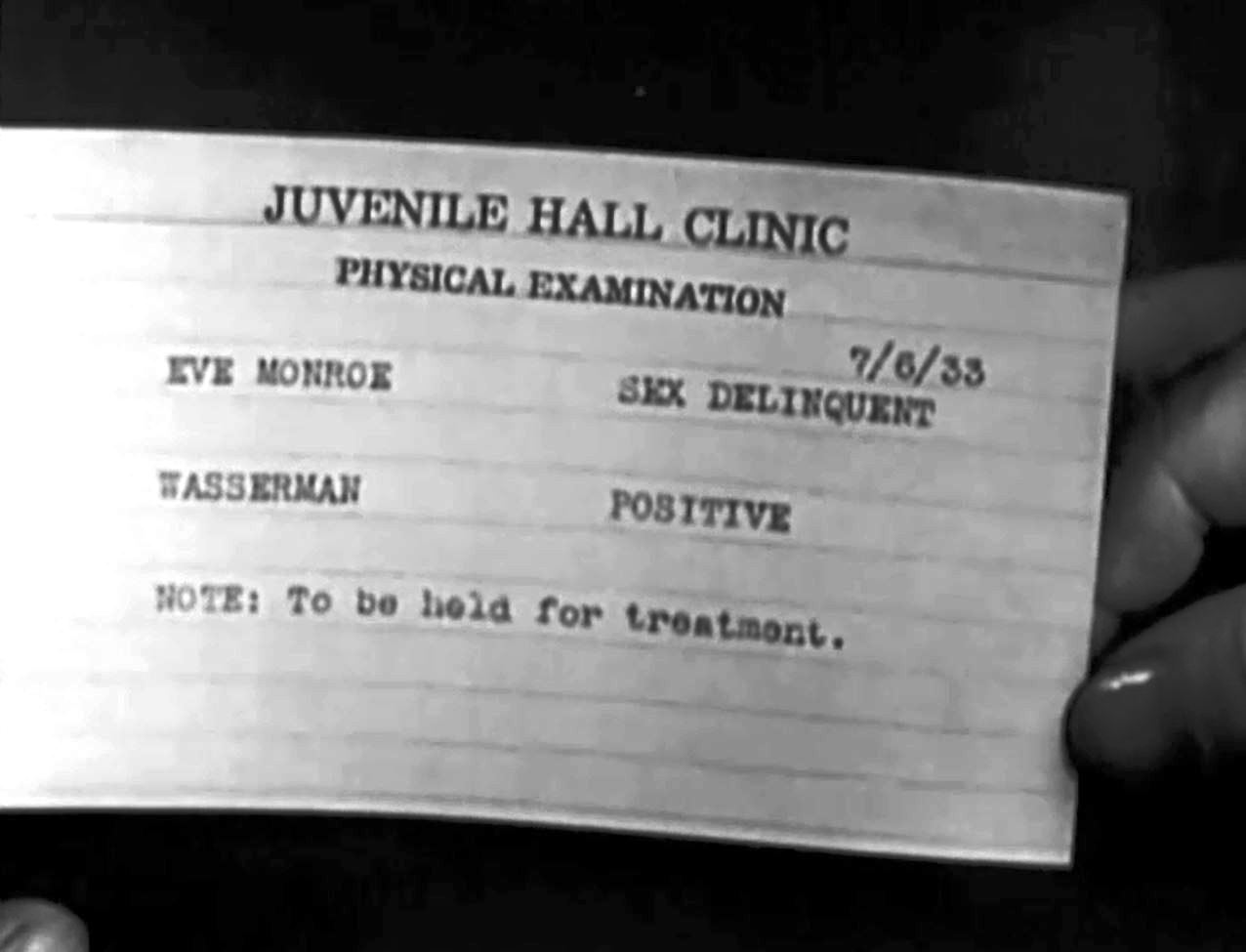
- The test was sufficiently familiar to American movie audiences that the 1934 exploitation film The Road to Ruin simply showed a card with a positive Wassermann test (misspelled in the film) without any further explanation to indicate a character had contracted syphilis.
- Synonyms: Wassermann reaction
- Purpose: antibody test for syphilis

The Wassermann test or Wassermann reaction (WR) is an antibody test for syphilis, named after the bacteriologist August Paul von Wassermann, based on complement fixation. It was the first blood test for syphilis and the first in the nontreponemal test (NTT) category. Newer NTTs, such as the RPR and VDRL tests, have mostly replaced it. During the mid-20th century, in many jurisdictions, including most US states, applicants for a marriage license were required by law to undergo a Wassermann test.

== Method ==
A sample of blood or cerebrospinal fluid is taken and introduced to the antigen – cardiolipin extracted from bovine muscle or heart. Syphilis non-specific antibodies (reagin, see RPR) react with the lipid – the Wassermann reaction of antiphospholipid antibodies (APAs). The intensity of the reaction (classed 1, 2, 3, or 4) indicates the severity of the condition.

== Uncertainty ==
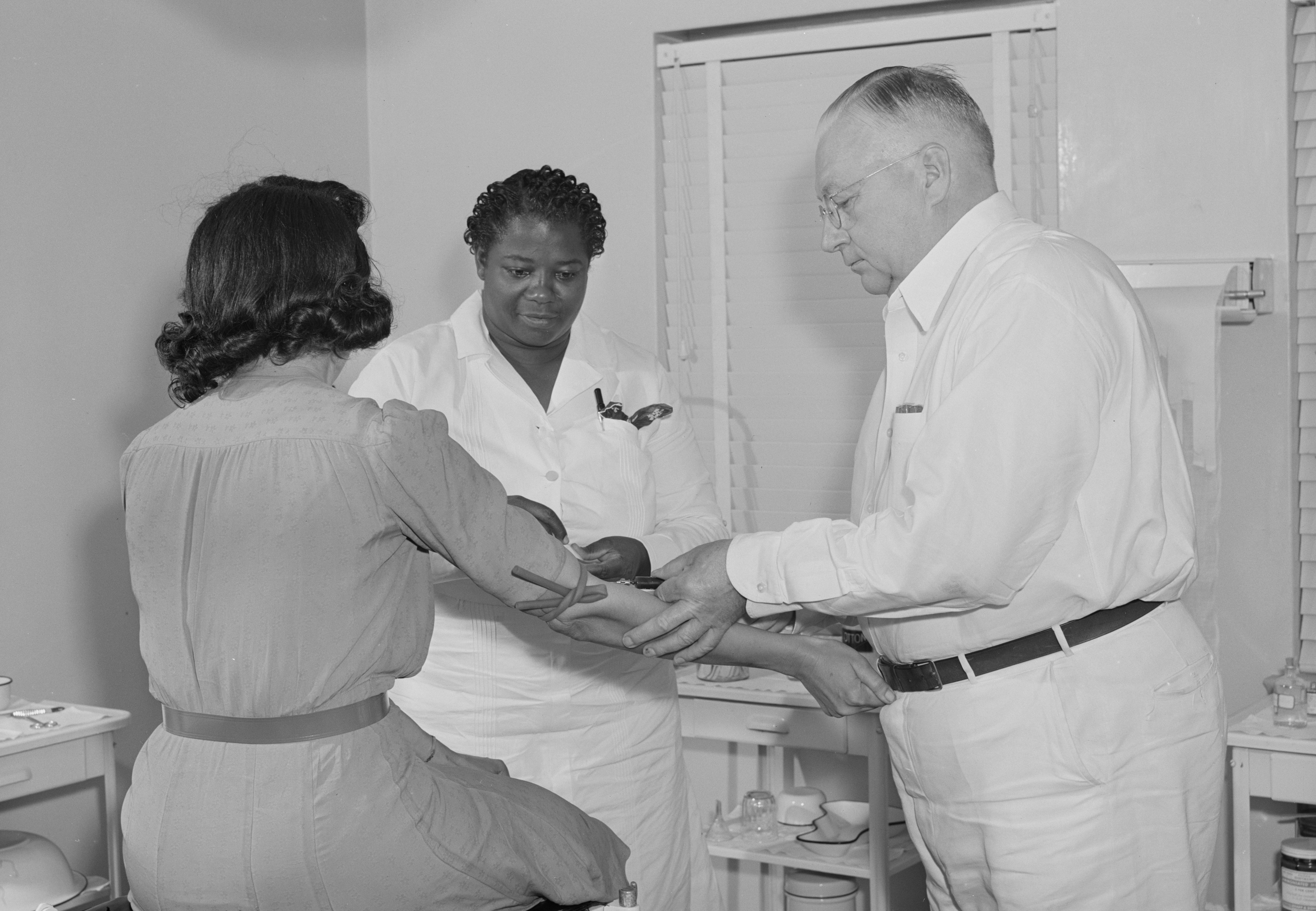
Administration of a Wassermann test at a clinic for Florida migratory farm workers in 1941.

The reaction is not specific to syphilis and will produce a positive reaction to other diseases, including systemic lupus erythematosus, malaria, and tuberculosis. It is possible for an infected individual to produce no reaction and for a successfully treated individual to continue to produce a reaction (known as being "Wassermann fast" or "fixed").

The Wassermann test is ineffective at identifying primary syphilis as sufficient reagin has not yet been produced from tissue destruction at this stage. Therefore, more effective methods have been a common research topic.

== Development and refinement ==
The antibody test was developed by Wassermann, Julius Citron, and Albert Neisser at the Robert Koch Institute for Infectious Diseases in 1906. The test was a growth from the work of Bordet and Gengou on complementing-fixation reaction, published in 1901, and the positive reaction is sometimes called the Bordet-Gengou-Wassermann reaction or Bordet-Wassermann reaction.

The Wassermann test has been refined with the Kahn test and the Kolmer test, and it is rarely used today. Replacement tests such as the VDRL test and the RPR test, initially based on flocculation techniques (Hinton), have been shown to produce far fewer false positive results. Indeed, the "biologic false positives" of modern tests usually indicate a serious alternate condition, often an autoimmune disease.
