= Fluorescent treponemal antibody absorption test =

FTA-ABS Fluorescent treponemal antibody absorption test
- Purpose: diagnostic test for syphilis

The fluorescent treponemal antibody absorption (FTA-ABS) test is a diagnostic test for syphilis. Using antibodies specific for the Treponema pallidum species, such tests would be assumed to be more specific than non-treponemal testing such as VDRL but have been shown repeatedly to be sensitive but not specific for the diagnosis of neurosyphilis in cerebrospinal fluid (CSF). In addition, FTA-ABS turns positive earlier and remains positive longer than VDRL. Other treponemes, such as T. pertenue, may also produce a positive FTA-ABS. The ABS suffix refers particularly to a processing step used to remove nonspecific antispirochetal antibodies present in normal serum.

In general, the test has two roles:

1. As a confirmatory test for a positive result from a serum screening test (RPR for example).
2. Since the test has high negative predictive value it is very useful in both serum or CSF to exclude/rule out neurosyphilis if the FTA test result is negative. " A negative FTA in serum excludes neurosyphilis".

== Procedure ==
The antigen for the FTA-ABS test is whole bacteria. The bacteria cannot be cultured on laboratory media, so the organisms used are a lyophilized suspension of T. pallidum extracted from rabbit testicular tissue. This is spread over and fixed to a slide. Patient serum is mixed with an absorbent (the "ABS" part of the test) containing an extract of a non-pathogenic treponeme, Treponema phagedenis biotype Rieter. The purpose of the absorbent is to remove anti-treponemal antibodies that are not specific for the syphilis bacteria. The pre-adsorbed patient serum is then added to the slide; if the patient has been infected by syphilis, their antibodies will bind to the bacteria. FITC (a fluorophore)-labeled anti-treponeme antibody and TRITC (another fluorophore)-labeled anti-human antibodies are added as secondary antibodies. The spirochete location is identified using the FITC staining, and the TRITC staining identifies whether the patient has anti-T. pallidum antibodies (binding to the same spirochete).

== Utility ==
This test is not useful for following therapy, because it does not wane with successful treatment of the disease, and will continue to be positive for many years after primary exposure. FTA is nearly 100% sensitive in CSF, meaning negative CSF FTA excludes neurosyphilis.
