= Erich Hoffmann =

German dermatologist

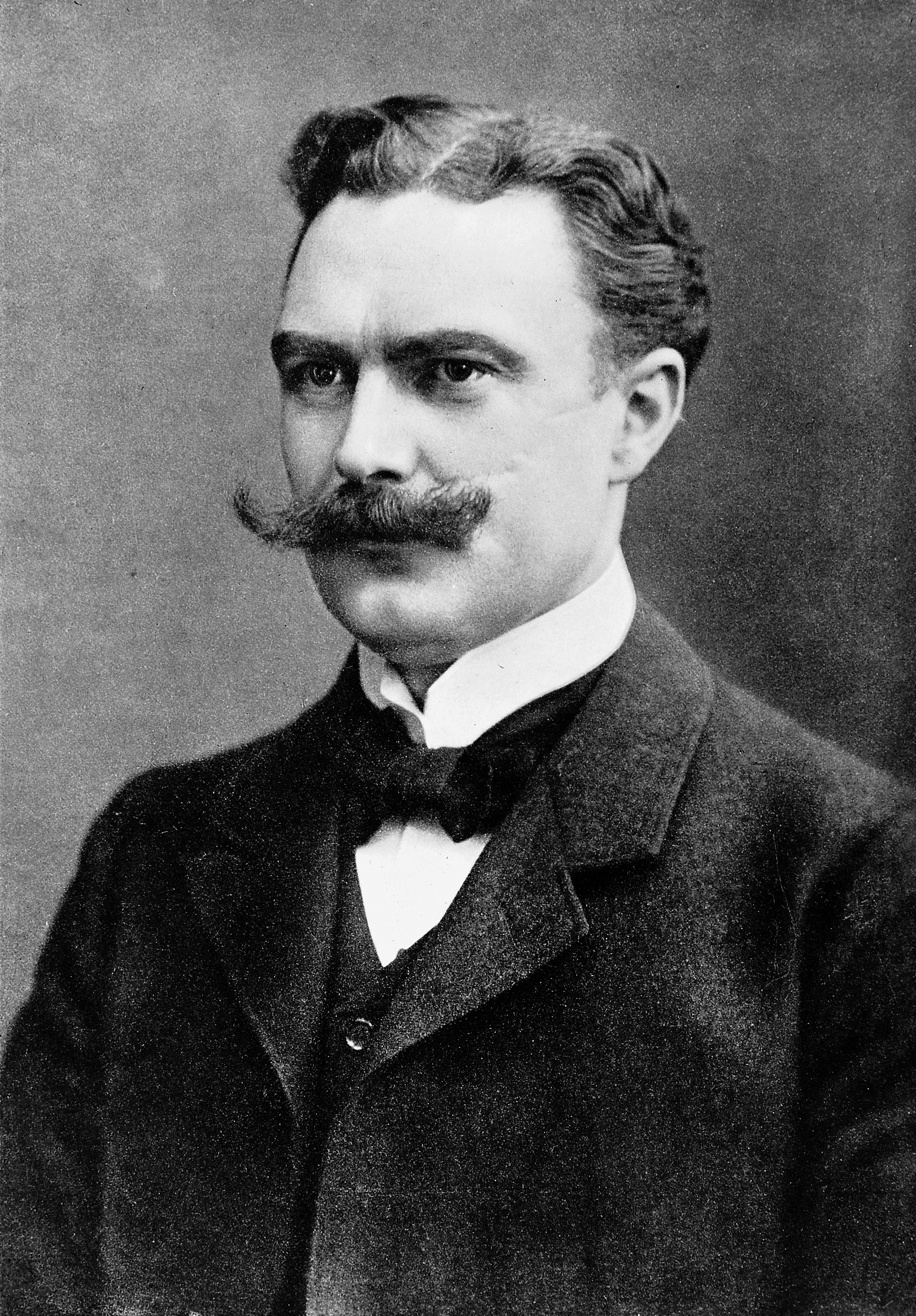
Image of Erich Hoffmann

Erich Hoffmann (25 April 1868 – 8 May 1959) was a German dermatologist who was a native of Witzmitz, Pomerania.

He studied medicine at the Berlin Military Academy, and was later a professor at the Universities of Halle and Bonn.

Hoffmann is remembered for his research performed with zoologist Fritz Schaudinn (1871-1906) at the Charité Clinic in Berlin. In 1905 Schaudinn and Hoffmann discovered the bacterium that was responsible for syphilis, a spiral-shaped spirochete called Treponema pallidum, which they first called Spirochaeta pallida. The organism was removed from a papule in the vulva of a woman with secondary syphilis. The two doctors documented their findings in a treatise called Vorläufiger Bericht über das Vorkommen von Spirochaeten in syphilitischen Krankheitsprodukten und bei Papillome.

Hoffmann left Germany during the era of National Socialism, but returned to Bonn after the war and established a laboratory. In the late 1940s he published two books about his life in medicine, titled "Wollen und Schaffen" and "Ringen um Vollendung".

== Selected publications ==
- Hoffmann, Erich (1906). Die Ätiologie der Syphilis. Berlin: Verlag von Julius Springer. ISBN 9783642917196.
