= August von Wassermann =

German bacteriologist and hygienist (1866-1925)

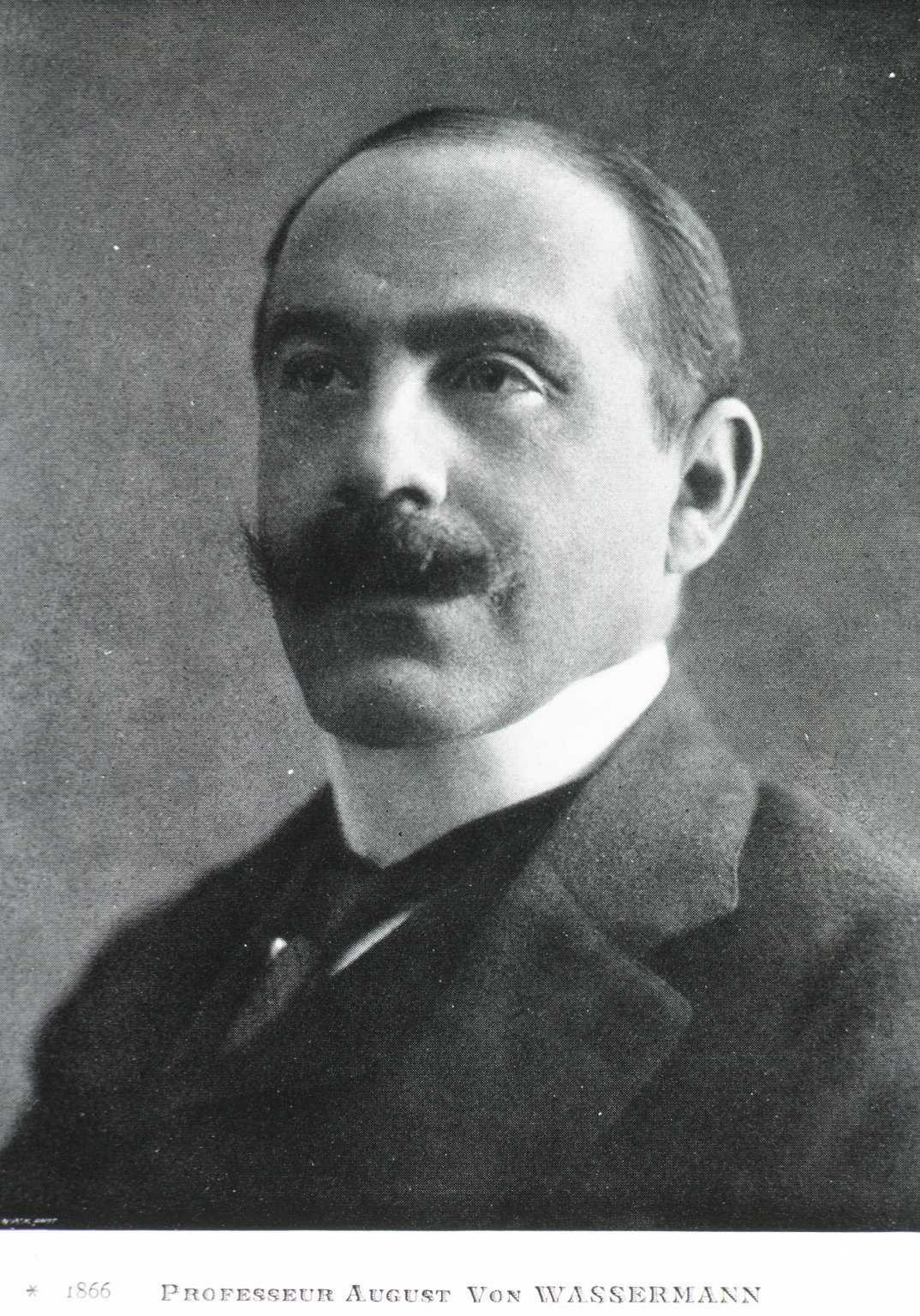
- Born: August Paul von Wassermann; 21 February 1866; Bamberg, Upper Franconia, Kingdom of Bavaria
- Died: 16 March 1925 (aged 59); Berlin, Germany
- Occupations: Bacteriologist, hygienist

August Paul von Wassermann (21 February 1866 – 16 March 1925) was a German bacteriologist and hygienist.

Born in Bamberg, with Jewish origins, he studied at several universities throughout Germany, receiving his medical doctorate in 1888 from the University of Strassburg. In 1890 he began work under Robert Koch at the Institute for Infectious Diseases in Berlin. In 1906 he became director of the division for experimental therapy and serum research at the institute, followed by a directorship of the department of experimental therapy at the Kaiser-Wilhelm-Gesellschaft for the Advancement of Science in Berlin-Dahlem (1913).

Wassermann developed a complement fixation test for the diagnosis of syphilis in 1906, just one year after the causative organism, Spirochaeta pallida, had been identified by Fritz Schaudinn and Erich Hoffmann. The so-called "Wassermann test" allowed for early detection of the disease (despite its nonspecific symptoms), and thus prevention of transmission. He attributed the development of the test to earlier findings of Jules Bordet and Octave Gengou (complement fixation reaction) and to a hypothesis introduced by Paul Ehrlich in his interpretation of antibody formation.

The Wassermann test remains a staple of syphilis detection and prevention in some areas, although it has often been replaced by more modern alternatives. With Wilhelm Kolle, he published the six-volume Handbuch der Pathogenen Mikroorganismen (Handbook of Pathogenic Microorganisms).

He was the first recipient of the Aronson Prize in 1921.
