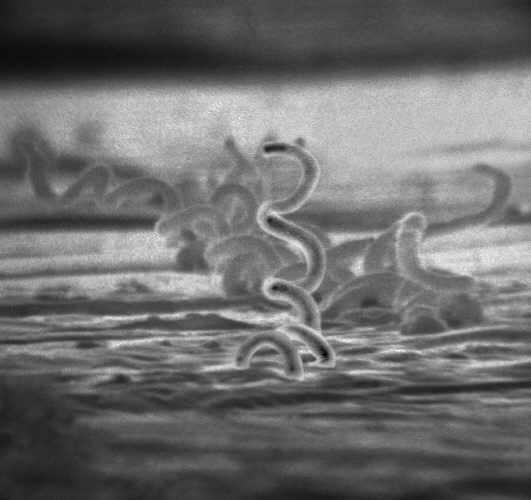

Scientific classification
- Domain: Bacteria
- Kingdom: Pseudomonadati
- Phylum: Spirochaetota
- Class: Spirochaetia
- Order: Spirochaetales
- Family: Treponemataceae
- Genus: Treponema
- Species: T. pallidum

Binomial name
- Treponema pallidum (Schaudinn & Hoffmann 1905) Schaudinn 1905

Synonyms
- "Spirochaeta pallida" Schaudinn & Hoffmann 1905 (Note: This name is not considered to be validly published by the List of Prokaryotic names with Standing in Nomenclature)

= Treponema pallidum =

Species of bacterium

Treponema pallidum, formerly known as Spirochaeta pallida, is a microaerophilic, gram-negative, spirochaete bacterium whose subspecies cause the diseases syphilis, Bejel (also known as endemic syphilis), and yaws. It is primarily transmitted through sexual contact and can enter the host through mucosal membranes or open lesions in the skin. T. pallidum is a helically coiled microorganism and an obligate parasite that depends on its host for survival and is known to infect only humans and baboons. T. pallidum consists of three subspecies, T. p. pallidum, T. p. endemicum, and T. p. pertenue, each of which has a distinct related disorder. Treponema pallidum can be treated with antibiotics such as penicillin-G or prevented using doxycycline as post-exposure prophylaxis (doxy-PEP). There is currently no approved vaccine against Treponema pallidum.

== Subspecies ==
Three subspecies of T. pallidum are known:

- Treponema pallidum pallidum, which causes syphilis
- T. p. endemicum, which causes bejel or endemic syphilis
- T. p. pertenue, which causes yaws

The three subspecies causing yaws, bejel, and syphilis are morphologically and serologically indistinguishable. The genomes of three of the T. p. pertenue strains are similar to those of the T. p. pallidum strain, differing by only 0.2%, corresponding to virulence factors. The three subspecies can be distinguished by genetics, using restriction fragment length polymorphism (RFLP), which utilizes techniques such as PCR, restriction digest and gel electrophoresis. Genes tprC, tprI, and the 5' flanking region of tpp15 can be used to differentiate between the three subspecies based on DNA fragment lengths and location of bands in gel electrophoresis. These bacteria were originally classified as members of separate species, but DNA hybridization analysis indicates they are members of the same species. Treponema carateum, the cause of pinta, remains a separate species because no isolate is available for DNA analysis. Disease transmittance in subspecies T. p. endemicum and T. p. pertenue is considered non-venereal. T. p. pallidum is the most invasive pathogenic subspecies, while T. carateum is the least invasive of the species. T. p. endemicum and T. p. pertenue are intermediately invasive.

=== Laboratory diagnosis and identification ===
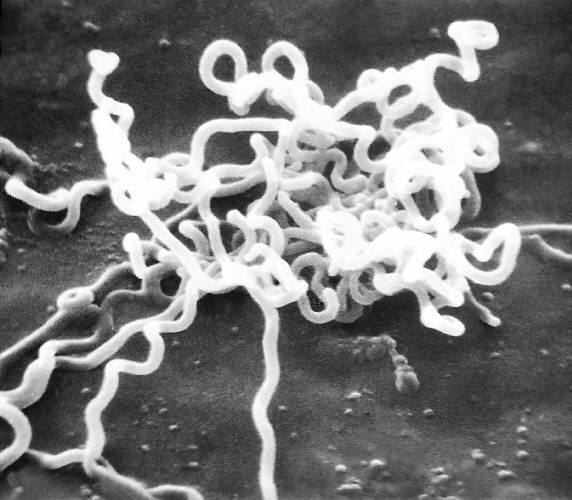
Electron micrograph image of T. pallidum cultured on epithelial cells of cotton-tail rabbits.

Treponema pallidum was first microscopically identified in syphilitic chancres by Fritz Schaudinn and Erich Hoffmann at the Charité in Berlin in 1905. Historically, this bacterium was identified in the clinical laboratory through visualization in dark-field microscopy or special staining techniques such as Dieterle stain. Syphilis is diagnosed by serology, which involves a non-treponemal screening test such as RPR and VDRL followed by treponemal-specific confirmation tests such as the treponema hemagglutination assay (TPHA) and the Treponema pallidum particle agglutination assay (TPPA). Non-treponemal tests can be used for the monitoring of response to treatments, whereas treponemal tests detect specific antibodies to T. pallidum specific antigens.

The reverse algorithm of syphilis diagnosis involves primary screening using treponemal tests with a confirmation of non-treponemal tests such as RPR. Treponemal tests often remain positive for life whereas non-treponemal test results can be used to monitor disease activity and response to treatment. RPR levels usually drop and often become negative after treatment, but in some people it stays reactive at a low, stable level. These tests can occasionally yield false negatives in the very early days of a primary chancre before the body mounts a detectable antibody response.

Primary lesions (chancres) can be tested by PCR.

Neurosyphilis is diagnosed by a combination of clinical evaluation, serological blood tests, and cerebrospinal fluid (CSF) analysis via a lumbar puncture.

Newer genetic technology is currently in early stages of development and testing, which shows possibilities in diagnosis using CRISPR-based nucleic acid detection systems. This can improve detection in early stages of the infection and is particularly useful in recourse-poor settings.

== Microbiology ==
=== Physiology ===
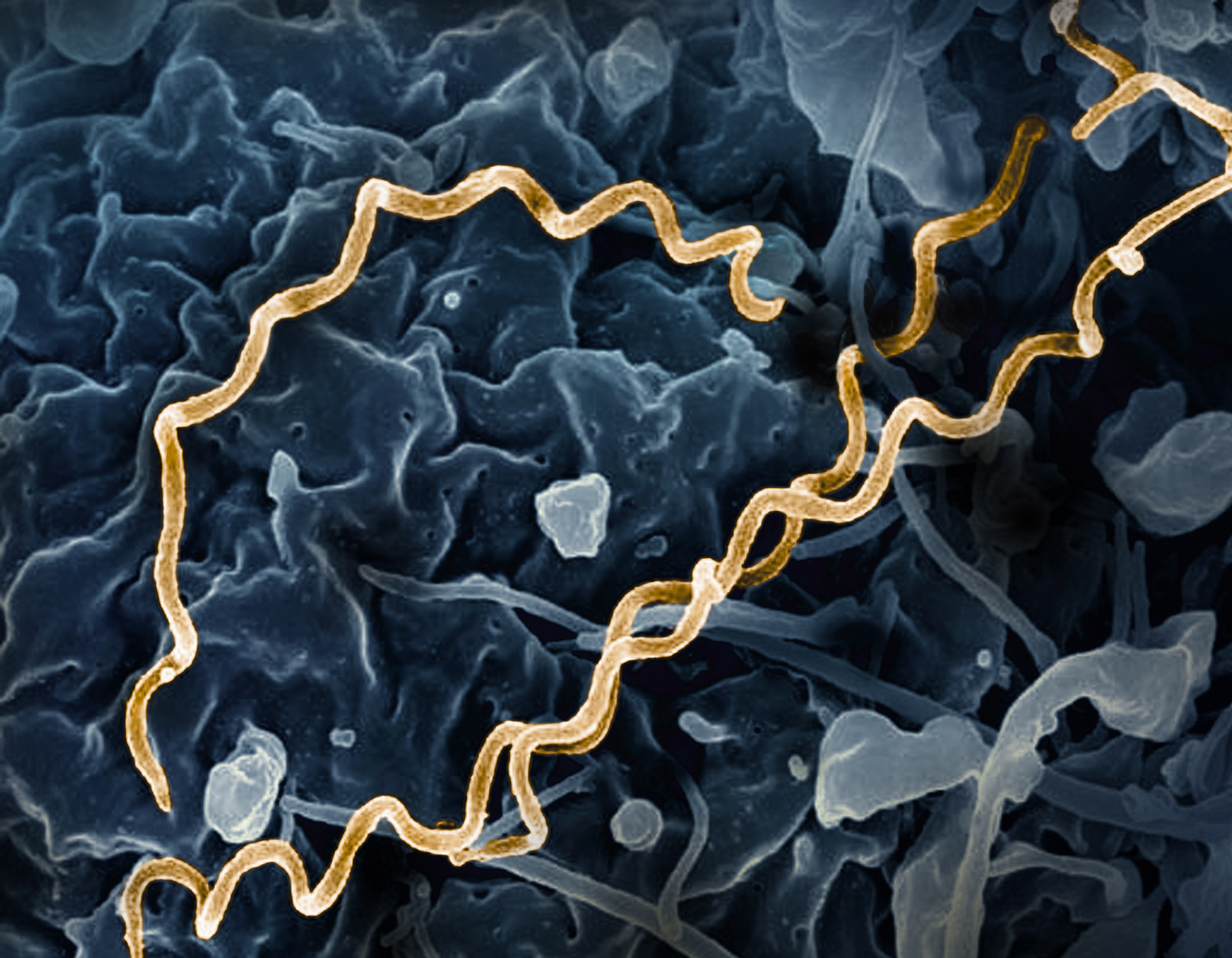
Electron micrograph image of T. pallidum, highlighted in gold.

Treponema pallidum is a helically shaped bacterium with high motility consisting of an outer membrane, peptidoglycan layer, inner membrane, protoplasmic cylinder, and periplasmic space. It is often described as gram-negative, but its outer membrane lacks lipopolysaccharide, which is found in the outer membrane of other gram-negative bacteria. It has an endoflagellum (periplasmic flagellum) consisting of four main polypeptides, a core structure, and a sheath. The flagellum is located within the periplasmic space and wraps around the protoplasmic cylinder. The flagellum is arranged in a helical shape. The flagellar motor for T. pallidum lacks a P-ring, normally used for motility, and has a collar component instead, which is embedded in the periplasm. The peptidoglycan layer interacts with the endoflagellum which may aid in motility. T. pallidum's outer membrane has the most contact with host cells and contains few transmembrane proteins, limiting antigenicity, while its cytoplasmic membrane is covered in lipoproteins. The outer membrane adhesins of T. pallidum, including fibronectin- and laminin-binding proteins, have the main function of attaching to host cells and cell-surface receptors, and they share antigenically related functional domains. The genus Treponema has ribbons of cytoskeletal cytoplasmic filaments that run the length of the cell just underneath the cytoplasmic membrane.

=== Outer membrane and surface antigens ===
Treponema pallidum has had several features uncovered that, historically, have made researcher's abilities to uncover more about the bacterium difficult. It has been evidently tedious to perform experiments with in a lab setting as the outer membrane can be harmed by centrifugation and exposure to nonionic detergents like Triton X-100 and Triton X-114. On top of its fragility, the outer membrane has been found to have an unusually low concentration of membrane-spanning proteins in comparison to other spirochetes.

Protein	Description
OmpW-like Protein (TP0126)	A putative outer membrane protein that mirrors some structural features to the OmpW-family porins. The protein is regulated by length changes of repeated DNA sequences.
BamA (TP0326)	This protein, otherwise known as Tp92, is responsible for inserting β-barrel assembly machine Bam A. It contains both a membrane-spanning region and areas that extend into the periplasm.
Outer Membrane lipoprotein (TP0453)	A lipoprotein associated with the inner part of the outer membrane and typically held away from antibodies outside of the bacterium.
OmpA-like domain protein (TP0624)	This protein has three structural parts that resemble the peptidoglycan-binding domains found in OmpA proteins. It helps organize peptidoglycan and provides stability for the cellular envelope.
Pallilysin (TP0751)	This protein binds parts of the host extracellular matrix like laminin. It's also shown contributions to attachment features and dissemination.
TP0965	Although not investigated as intensely like other proteins, it's shown to play a part in a bacterial export system, activation of cultured endothelial cells, and increased permeability of endothelial-cell layers.

=== Treponema repeat family of proteins ===
The Treponema repeat family of proteins (Tpr) are proteins expressed during the infection process. Tprs are formed by a conserved N-terminal domain, an amino-terminal stretch of about 50 amino acids, a central variable region, and a conserved C-terminal domain. The many different types of Tpr include TprA, TprB, TprC, TprD, and TprE, and TprK, which notably has the most research conducted on it because of its variability that can contribute to immune evasion.

The reason that TprK is well studied in comparison to the other Tprs is due to its antigenic variation. TprK has seven variable regions V1-V7 that are able to change through gene conversion by having silent chromosomal donor sequences. Variants are still being recorded as new variants are able to form without pressure from the immune system, but the host's adaptive immune system plays a role in which variants can accumulate. Changes in regions V1-V7 have the ability to lower the rate at which antibody recognition of earlier variants occurs. A study using rabbit models found that impairing TprK antigenic variation led to a lowered amount of bacterial burdens in the rabbits as well as far less harmful lesions, thus bolstering its role in infection.

To introduce more phenotypic diversity, T. pallidum may undergo phase variation. This process mainly happens in TprF, TprI, TprG, TprJ, and TprL, and it consists of a reversible expansion or contraction of polymeric repeats. These size variations can help the bacterium to quickly adapt to its microenvironment, dodge immune response, or even increase affinity to its host.

=== Culture ===
In the past century since its initial discovery, culturing the bacteria in vitro has been difficult. Without the ability to grow and maintain the bacteria in a laboratory setting, discoveries regarding its metabolism and antimicrobial sensitivity were greatly impaired. However, successful long-term cultivation of T. pallidum in vitro was reported in 2017. This was achieved using Sf1Ep epithelial cells from rabbits, which were a necessary condition for the continued multiplication and survival of the system. The medium TpCM-2 was used, an alteration of more simple media which previously only yielded a few weeks of culture growth. This success was the result of switching out minimal essential medium (MEM) with CMRL 1066, a complex tissue culture medium. With development, new discoveries about T. pallidum's requirements for growth and gene expression may occur and in turn, yield research beneficial for the treatment and prevention of syphilis, outside of a host. The challenge likely stems from the organism's strong adaptation to residing in mammalian tissue, resulting in a reduced genome and significant impairments in metabolic and biosynthetic functions.

== Metabolism ==
The bacteria rely on the enzyme glycerol-3-phosphate dehydrogenase (GPDH). GPDH is an alternative when managing electrons that are produced during metabolism. In the absence of the electron transport chain, T. pallidum uses GPDH to recycle the NAD+ by oxidizing glycerol-3-phosphate to dihydroxyacetone phosphate and make NAD+ to keep glycolysis and other redox-dependent energy reactions. By doing this, it helps balance the ATP yield without weighing down the protein's limited supply for essential tasks.

T. pallidum uses an enzyme called pyrophosphate-dependent phosphofructokinase rather than ATP as a way to save energy and optimize its limited resources.

T. pallidum manages without a complete tricarboxylic acid cycle and oxidative phosphorylation by using different efficient strategies including redox balancing and substrate-level to survive the nutrient-limited host environment.

T. pallidum lacks enzyme orthologs for superoxide dismutase, however it does possess a superoxide reductase, maintaining the ability to reduce reactive oxygen species. In addition, T. pallidum encodes an alkyl hydroperoxide reductase C, which allows for the reduction of hydrogen peroxide to water and alcohols. This enzyme relies on TP0919, a protein present in the cytoplasm of T. pallidum.

T. pallidum primarily relies on glucose as its primary carbon source through glycolysis, but one study has proposed the bacterium uses an acetogenic-energy conservation pathway as a way to catabolize D-lactate as an alternative carbon source. Currently, three proteins from the pathway have been identified, of which include D-lactate dehydrogenase, phosphotransacetylase, and the acetate kinase. The acetate kinase specifically acts to catabolize D-lactate for substrate-level phosphorylation of ADP into ATP, producing acetate as a byproduct. This pathway, which takes place in the cytoplasm, can also generate ATP by assisting the maintenance of the electrochemical gradient that lies between the periplasm and cytoplasm of T. pallidum.

== Genome ==
The genome of T. pallidum was first sequenced in 1998 and revealed a small 1.14 Mbp genome, one of the smallest bacterial genomes. The GC-content is 52.8%. The DNA sequences of T. pallidum species are more than 99.7% identical, and PCR-based assays are effective at differentiating these species. About 92.9% of DNA was determined to be open reading frames, 55% of which had predicted biological functions, while 17% matched hypothetical proteins of unknown function in other organisms and the remainder (28%) did not have significant similarity to other known sequences.

The small size of the T. pallidum genome indicates that the species has limited metabolic capabilities, and thus mostly relies on its host for many molecules typically provided by biosynthetic pathways. For instance, it is missing genes encoding key enzymes in oxidative phosphorylation and the tricarboxylic acid cycle. Thus, T. pallidum is no longer able to synthesize fatty acids, nucleic acids, and amino acids, instead relying on its mammalian hosts for these materials. T. pallidum's low levels of diversity within its DNA sequence, forces the pathogen to utilize horizontal gene transfer for genetic diversity, although the specific mechanism is not well understood. It may possibly be a clonal species that still employs recombination.

The strains T. pallidum pertenue (TPE) and T. pallidum endemicum (TEN) also experience gene transfer via different subspecies but are notably geographically isolated. Coinfection in humans of two separate subspecies strains may be possible, as indicated by a recombination event at the T.pallidum clade within their phylogenetic lineage.

== Clinical significance ==
The clinical features of syphilis, yaws, and bejel occur in multiple stages that affect the skin. The skin lesions observed in the early stage last for weeks or months. The skin lesions are highly infectious, and the spirochetes in the lesions are transmitted by direct contact. The lesions regress as the immune response develops against T. pallidum. The latent stage that results can last a lifetime in many cases. In a few cases, the disease exits latency and enters a tertiary phase, in which destructive lesions of skin, bone, and cartilage ensue. Unlike yaws and bejels, syphilis in its tertiary stage often affects the heart, eyes, and nervous system, as well.

=== Syphilis ===
Treponema pallidum is a motile spirochete that is generally acquired by close sexual contact and causes syphilis. The helical structure of T. p. pallidum allows it to move in a corkscrew motion through mucous membranes or enter minuscule breaks in the skin, entering the host via breaches in squamous or columnar epithelium. It gains access to the host's blood and lymph systems through tissue and mucous membranes. In more severe cases, it may gain access to the host by infecting the skeletal bones and central nervous system of the body. T. pallidum can also be acquired through non-sexual contact through means of active syphilis sores called chancres. Optimal growth occurs at 33-35 °C, hence infection and lesion development occur on warmer skin areas, but not on colder ones such as the colder ear.The organism can also be transmitted to a fetus by transplacental passage during the later stages of pregnancy, giving rise to congenital syphilis. This infection has been emerging globally in recent decades with approximately 8 million new infections worldwide in 2025. Some contemporary variants of T. p. pallidum strains have been failing to respond to the second line antibiotic azithromycin. This phylogenetic divergence and global presence point to the emergence of a pandemic strain cluster.

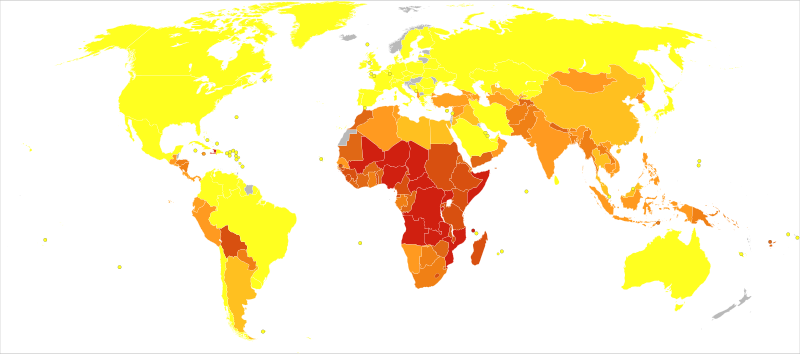
A map depicting the deaths per million persons caused by syphilis produced with data from the WHO (2012).

Due to its problematic cultivation in laboratory conditions, much remains unknown about the pathogenesis of T. pallidum. Recent studies have identified that T. pallidum can evade immune cells by interfering with normal function of microglia, which can help bacteria remain alive during infection. This study offers good foundation for further studies of T. pallidum pathogenesis and potentially new therapeutic targets.

=== Yaws ===
The causative agent of yaws is Treponema pallidum pertenue, and is found predominantly in poor, rural communities in the warm, humid regions of Africa, Pacific Islands, Asia, and South America. 50-80% of those affected are under 15, with peaks at ages 6-10.. Yaws is transmitted by direct skin-to-skin contact with infectious lesion fluid present. Unlike syphilis, yaws is not sexually transmitted, and vertical transmission is not thought to occur, with one strain of T. p. pertenue researched which did not cross the placenta. Infection begins with a primary lesion (the "mother yaw"), followed by secondary and, in some cases, tertiary disease. Yaws is treated with antibiotics such as azithromycin and benzathine penicillin-G.

=== Bejel ===
Main article: Bejel

Bejel or endemic syphilis caused by Treponema pallidum endemicum and is a disease that is endemic in hot and dry climates, primarily the Sahel region and the middle east. Bejel typically causes painless oral lesions which eventually progresses to destructive tissue lumps called gummas, and bone deformities. Bejel is traditionally a nonvenereal infection spread mainly through close skin-to-skin or mucosal contact, such as sharing utensils. However, rare cases of sexual transmission has been documented in reports outside of classic endemic areas, such as Japan, where a genetically distinct lineage of T. p. endemicum, was discovered among men who had sexual relations with other men. Bejel can be treated with benzathine penicillin-G.

=== Non-human infection ===
Treponema pallidum has been found in non-human primates in several regions across sub-Saharan Africa. All naturally occurring T. pallidum strains genotyped from non-human primates are T. p. pertenue or pertenue-like, the causative agent of yaws. Furthermore, In Tanzania specifically, the geographical distribution of T. pallidum closely aligns with the distribution of yaws in humans. While modern research suggests that the genomes of T. p. pertenue in non-human primate and human origin are indistinguishable from each other, there has yet to be clear evidence that natural primate-to-human transmission is possible. There is no evidence that supports the idea that antibiotics for T. p. pertenue in non-human primates are ineffective. However, treatment plans have not been established due to logistical reasons rather than treatment unavailability.

== Treatment and prevention ==
The treatment for syphilis is penicillin. Penicillin G is administered parenterally, and its dosage and length of treatment are dependent on the disease's developmental stage and the symptoms it produces. Additionally, doxycycline postexposure prophylaxis (doxy-PEP) is an antibiotic regimen which can reduce the risk of syphilis and other STIs. A CDC-reviewed clinical trial evaluated the effectiveness of doxy-PEP among men who have sex with men (MSM) and transgender women (TGW). The study found a substantial reduction in incident syphilis among participants using doxy‑PEP. The CDC recommends doxy-PEP for MSM, TGW, gay, or bisexual individuals with a history of at least one STI within the last 12 months. Individuals prescribed doxy-PEP are instructed to take 200 mg of doxycycline of any formulation within 72 hours of having oral, vaginal, or anal sex. There is currently no approved vaccine against Treponema pallidum. Vaccine development has been challenging because T. pallidum has very few exposed surface proteins and can evade the host immune system, making it difficult to identify effective vaccine targets.
