= Treponematosis =

- Specialty: Infectious disease

Skull showing signs of treponematosis discovered in Douai (16th–18th centuries) – Arkéos Archaeological Museum.

Treponematosis is a term used to individually describe any of the diseases caused by four members of the bacterial genus Treponema. The four diseases are collectively referred to as treponematoses:

- Syphilis (Treponema pallidum pallidum)
- Yaws (Treponema pallidum pertenue)
- Bejel (Treponema pallidum endemicum)
- Pinta (Treponema carateum)

Traditional laboratory tests cannot distinguish the treponematoses. However, sequence differences among the T. pallidum subspecies have been identified. Molecular approaches involving PCR to identify these sequences are being developed.
