= Rhagades =

Fissures, cracks, or linear scars in the skin associated with congenital syphilis

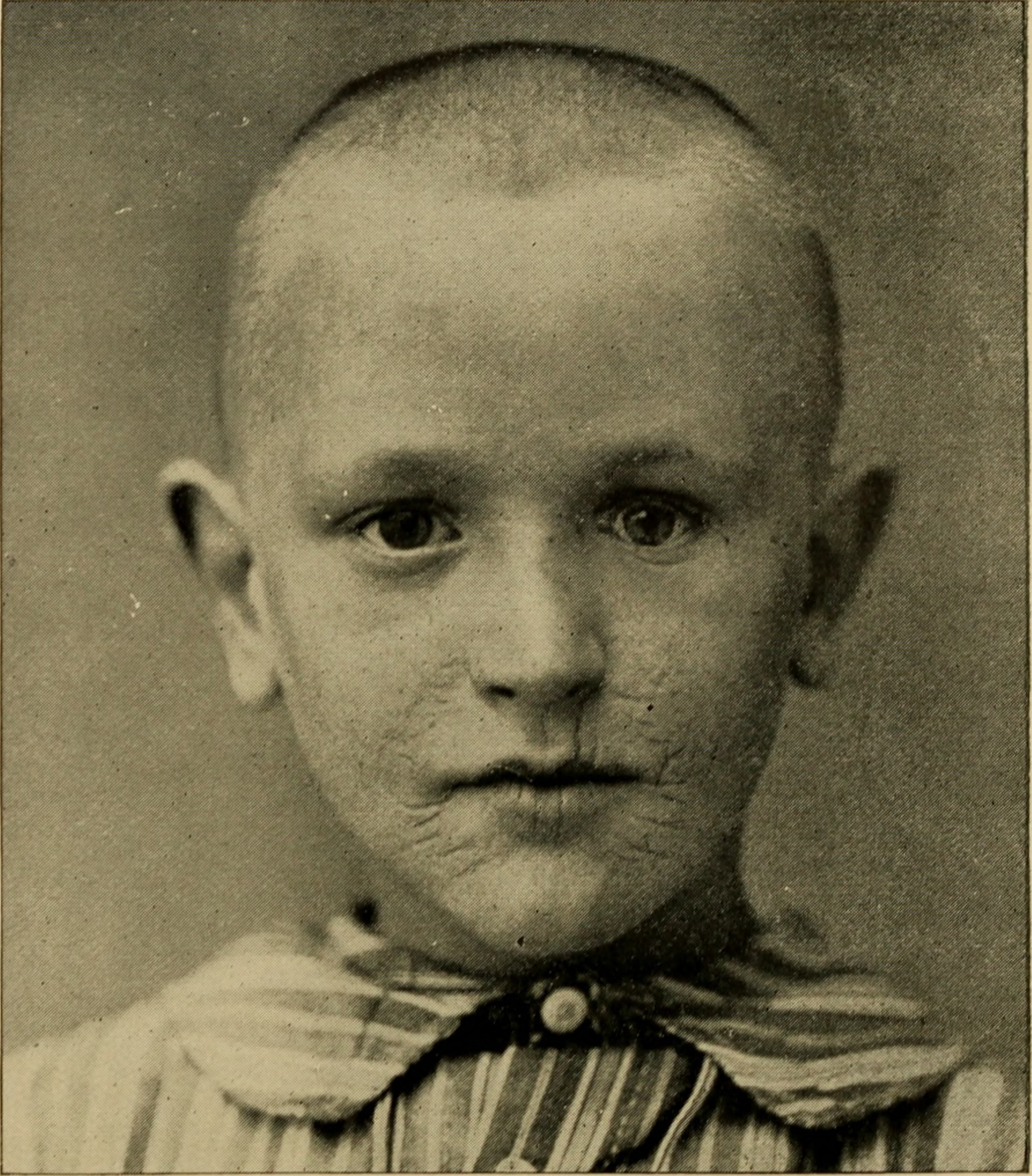
Fissures, or rhagades' (photo from "An American text-book of the diseases of children" (1895))

Rhagades are fissures, cracks, or linear scars in the skin, especially at the angles of the mouth and nose. They tend to form at areas of motion. They can be a result from bacterial infection of skin lesions. They are one of the late-stage manifestations of congenital syphilis; others are saber shins, Hutchinson teeth, saddle nose, and Clutton's joints (usually knee synovitis).

== See also ==
- Angular cheilitis
- Anal fissure
