= Hutchinson's triad =

Three clinical signs indicative of congenital syphilis

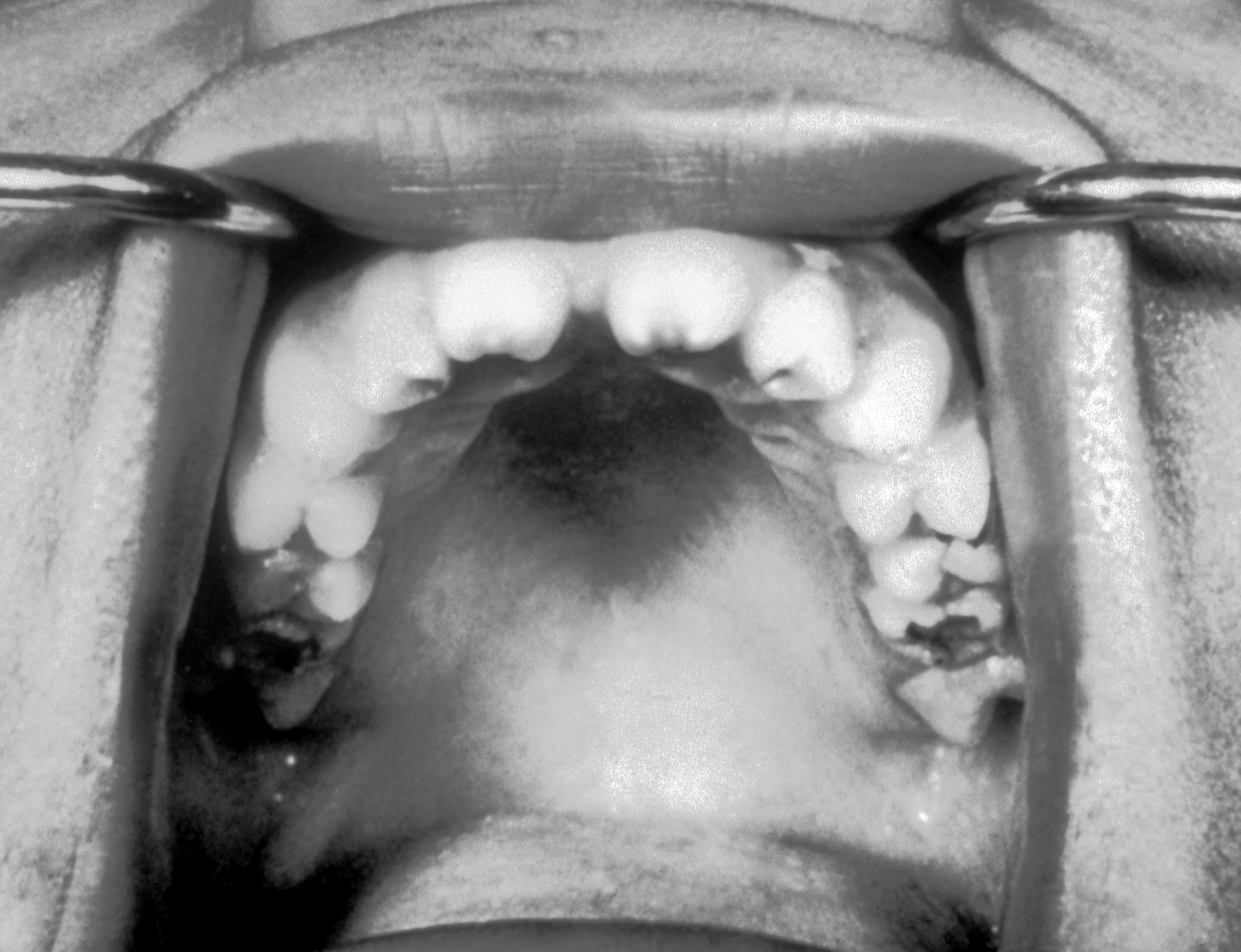
Hutchinson's teeth resulting from congenital syphilis

Hutchinson triad is a triad of signs that may be seen in late congenital syphilis, including: interstitial keratitis, malformed teeth (Hutchinson incisors and mulberry molars), and eighth nerve deafness.

Late congenital syphilis typically manifests after 2 years of age. It is a rare condition due to the high mortality rate of mother-to-child transmission (MTCT) of syphilis. Nearly 40% of MTCT of syphilis result in pregnancy loss or neonatal fatality. Additionally, only 15% of liveborn infants are symptomatic.

The triad is named after British surgeon Sir Jonathan Hutchinson. He noted that defects in teeth were a consistent feature in congenital syphilis.

If congenital syphilis is not diagnosed and treated quickly, it may result in significant, permanent physical harm. These potential morbidities include Hutchinson's triad, thickening of the clavicle, juvenile paresis, juvenile tabes dorsalis, aortitis, and asymptomatic neurosyphilis. Thus highlighting the importance of early screening in pregnant women and neonates, with prompt treatment.

== Pathophysiology ==
Congenital syphilis results from the transmission of Treponema pallidum (a spirochete bacteria) from an infected mother to the fetus. Transmission can occur in utero via the placenta or during delivery. If congenital syphilis goes unidentified at birth, most of the clinical signs and symptoms will develop years later.

Malformed dentition (Hutchinson incisors and mulberry molars) are the result of a disruption to enamel formation. During development, Treponema pallidum invades proximate to the dental germ layers. The inflammatory reaction cause by the bacteria results in the inhibition of ameloblasts–the cells that produce enamel.

Interstitial keratitis is immune-mediated inflammation of the cornea, without an active corneal infection by Treponema pallidum bacteria. Essentially, the patient's immune cells over-activate, inducing a strong inflammatory reaction that damages the cornea.

Finally, cranial nerve eight deafness is the result of the syphilis infection spreading to the inner ear. The infection triggers several pathologic changes in the ear:

1. Periostitis (an inflammation of the fascia that surrounds the bone) of the ossicles and temporal bone
2. Atrophy of the organ of Corti–the inner-ear structure located in the cochlea that contains hair cells and contributes to audition
3. Creates an excess of endolymph fluid in the membranous labyrinth

These changes damage the spiral ganglion and cranial nerve 8 fibers, leading to progressive sensorineural hearing loss.

== Epidemiology ==
Despite treatment being widely accessible, the incidence of congenital syphilis is on the rise globally. From 2016-2023, 700,000 to 1.5 million cases of congenital syphilis were reported annually. Syphilis is endemic in most middle and low-income countries. However, in recent years, there are an increasing number of cases in higher-income countries as well. Nevertheless, it is difficult to accurately assess the global incidence for several reasons: variations in antenatal screening practices, availability of syphilis testing/testing facilities, appropriate follow up with healthcare providers, and ability to accurately collect surveillance data.

In the United States, the Centers for Disease Control and Prevention recommends syphilis screening at the first prenatal visit, and again early in the third trimester for individuals at high risk of infection. These recommendations differ in various countries based on the prevalence of syphilis. Additionally, areas without testing facilities will not report cases due to a lack of resources rather than an absence of the disease. These confounding variables lead to an underestimation of the true incidence of congenital syphilis.

== Presentation ==
Interstitial keratitis is usually seen between five and twenty years of age. It generally presents in both eyes, and the patient experiences concurrent photophobia, pain, corneal opacity, and excessive tearing. The corneal inflammation leads to blood vessel proliferation. Once the inflammation goes down, the blood vessels and opacities regress, inducing corneal scarring. The impact on vision depends on the severity of the scarring, but may vary from blurring to blindness.

Damage to the teeth occurs in the first weeks after birth, but as deciduous teeth are largely unaffected, the effects are not seen until the first permanent teeth erupt around six years old. Hutchinson incisors are peg-shaped, notched, widely-spaced upper central incisors. Mulberry molars are first molars, and have many small cusps, rather than the standard four. Both the incisors and molars demonstrate enamel thinning and discoloration.

Eighth nerve deafness typically starts with high-frequency hearing loss between eight and ten years old, but can start at a younger age. It may have sudden onset in one or both ears, and can progress rapidly. It can induce permanent hearing loss. There may also be a deformity on the nose known as saddle nose deformity.

== Treatment ==
Syphilis infections are treated with the administration of penicillin, a widely available antibiotic. However, if diagnosis of congenital syphilis is delayed until Hutchinson's triad is noted–among other signs and symptoms, such as nasal cartilage destruction (saddle nose), frontal bossing, joint swelling (Clutton joints), tibial thickening (Saber shins), hard palate defect–the damage is irreversible. In some cases, interstitial keratitis may respond to corticosteroids.

Overall, prevention of congenital syphilis with prenatal screening for maternal syphilis is the best treatment. Effective prevention requires routine prenatal screening, rapid treatment of all infected mothers, and partner tracing/treatment. Additionally, improved health education on STIs and safe sexual practices is essential. All infants with positive syphilis screenings should be treated immediately for improved long-term health outcomes, and should follow up regularly with their doctor for continued observation.
