= Hutchinson's sign =

Several clinical signs

Hutchinson's sign is a clinical sign which may refer to:

- Hutchinson's pupil, an unresponsive and enlarged pupil on the side of an intracranial mass
- Vesicles on the tip of the nose, or vesicles on the side of the nose, precedes the development of ophthalmic herpes zoster. This occurs because the nasociliary branch of the trigeminal nerve innervates both the cornea and the lateral dorsum of the nose as well as the tip of the nose. This sign is named after Sir Jonathan Hutchinson.

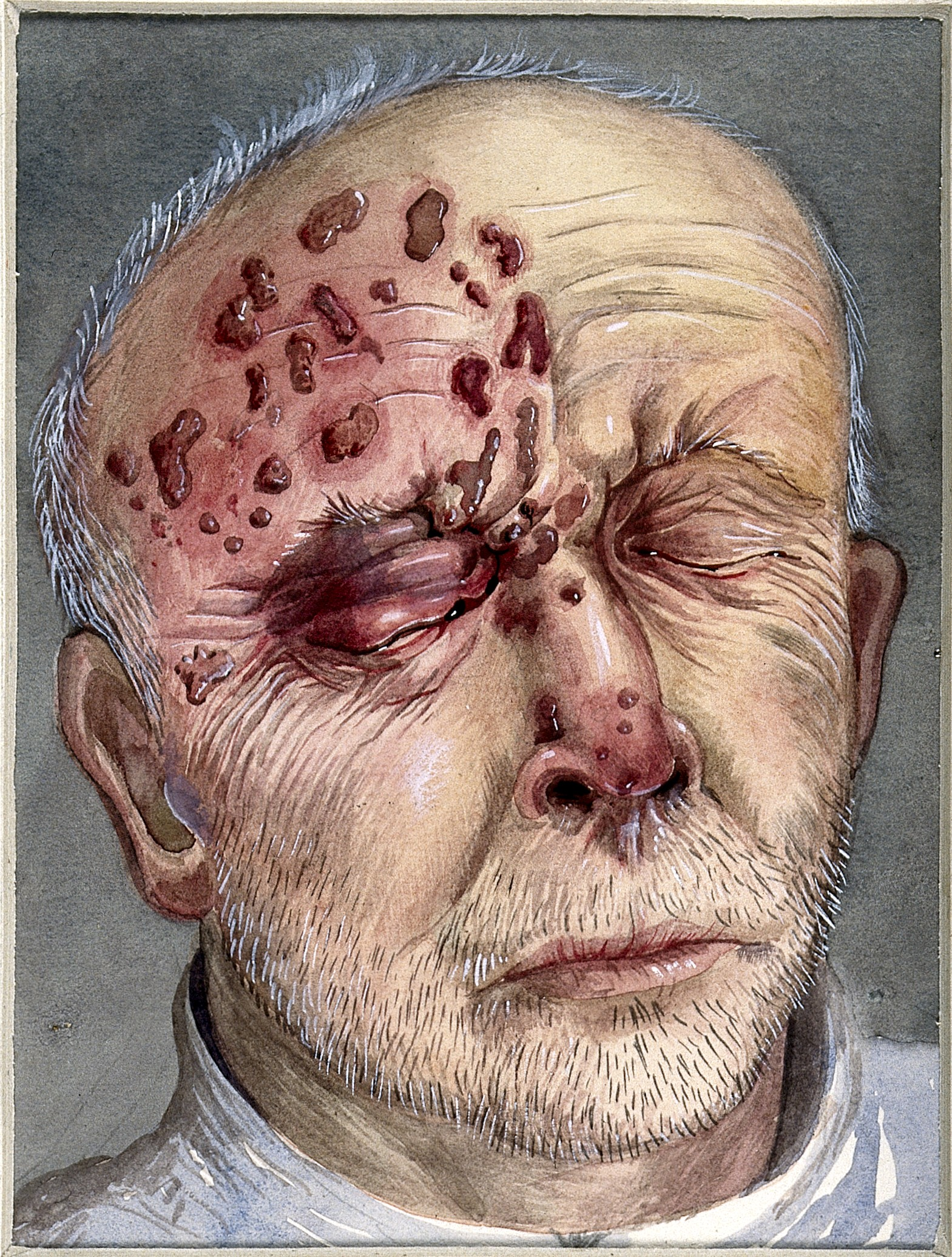
Ophthalmic herpes zoster with lesions on the tip and side of the nose

- Melanonychia with pigmentation of the proximal nail fold. This is an important sign of subungual melanoma although is not an infallible predictor. Periungual hyperpigmentation occurs in at least one nonmelanoma skin cancer, Bowen's disease of the nail unit. This is a nail fold pigmentation which then widens progressively to produce a triangular pigmented macule with associated nail dystrophy. Hyperpigmentation of the nail bed and matrix may reflect through the "transparent" nailfolds simulating Hutchinson's sign.
- Hutchinson's triad - pattern of presentation of congenital syphilis.

== See also ==
- Green nail sign
- List of cutaneous conditions
