= Jonathan Hutchinson =

English physician and pathologist (1828–1913)

Sir Jonathan Hutchinson
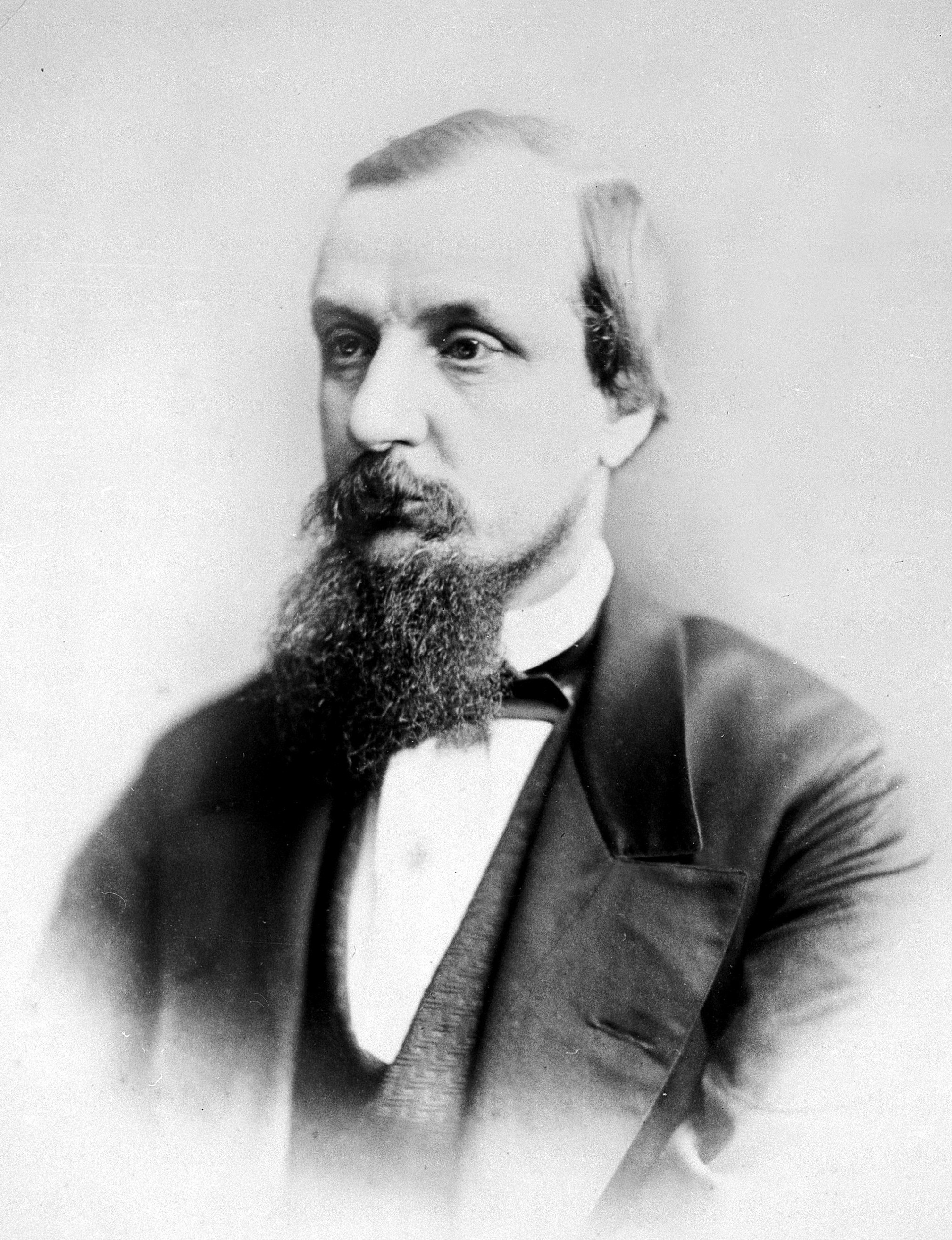
- Born: 23 July 1828; Selby, Yorkshire, England
- Died: 13 June 1913 (aged 84); Haslemere, Surrey, England
- Known for: First physician to describe Progeria
- Scientific career
- Fields: Surgeon, ophthalmologist, dermatologist venereologist pathologist

Sir Jonathan Hutchinson (23 July 1828 – 23 June 1913), was an English surgeon, ophthalmologist, dermatologist, venereologist, and pathologist, who notably advocated for circumcision. He founded Haslemere Educational Museum.

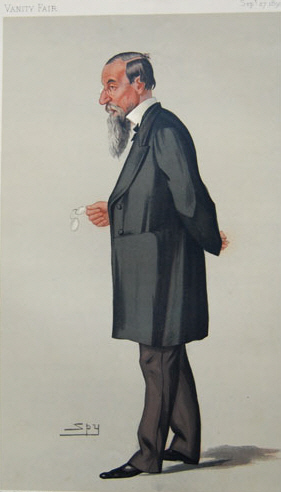
Caricature for Vanity Fair by Spy

== Life ==
Jonathan Hutchinson was born in Selby, Yorkshire, of Quaker parents and was educated in the local school. Then he was apprenticed for five years to Caleb Williams, an apothecary and surgeon in York.

He entered St Bartholomew's Hospital in London, and became a member of the Royal College of Surgeons in 1850 (and a fellow in 1862), and rapidly gained a reputation as a skilful operator and a scientific inquirer. While a student, Hutchinson chose a career in surgery from 1854 on, under the influence and help of his mentor, Sir James Paget (1814–99). In 1851, he studied ophthalmology at Moorfields and practised it at London Ophthalmic Hospital. Other hospitals where he practised in the following years were the Lock Hospital, the City of London Chest Hospital, the London Hospital, the Metropolitan Hospitals, and the Blackfriars Hospital for Diseases of the Skin.

His intense activity in so many medical specialities is reflected also in his involvement with several medical societies. He was president of the Hunterian Society in 1869 and 1870, Editor of the British Medical Journal (1869-1871), professor of surgery and pathology at the Royal College of Surgeons from 1877 to 1882, president of the Pathological Society (1879–80), of the Ophthalmological Society (1883), of the Neurological Society (1887) of the Medical Society (1890), and of the Royal Medical and Chirurgical Society from 1894 to 1896. In 1889, he was president of the Royal College of Surgeons. He was a member of two royal commissions, that of 1881 to inquire into the provision for smallpox and fever cases in the London hospitals, and that of 1889–96 on vaccination and leprosy. He also acted as honorary secretary to the Sydenham Society. In June 1882 he was elected a Fellow of the Royal Society.

He was the first orator at the York Medical Society.

Hutchinson is considered the father of oral medicine by some.

== Works ==
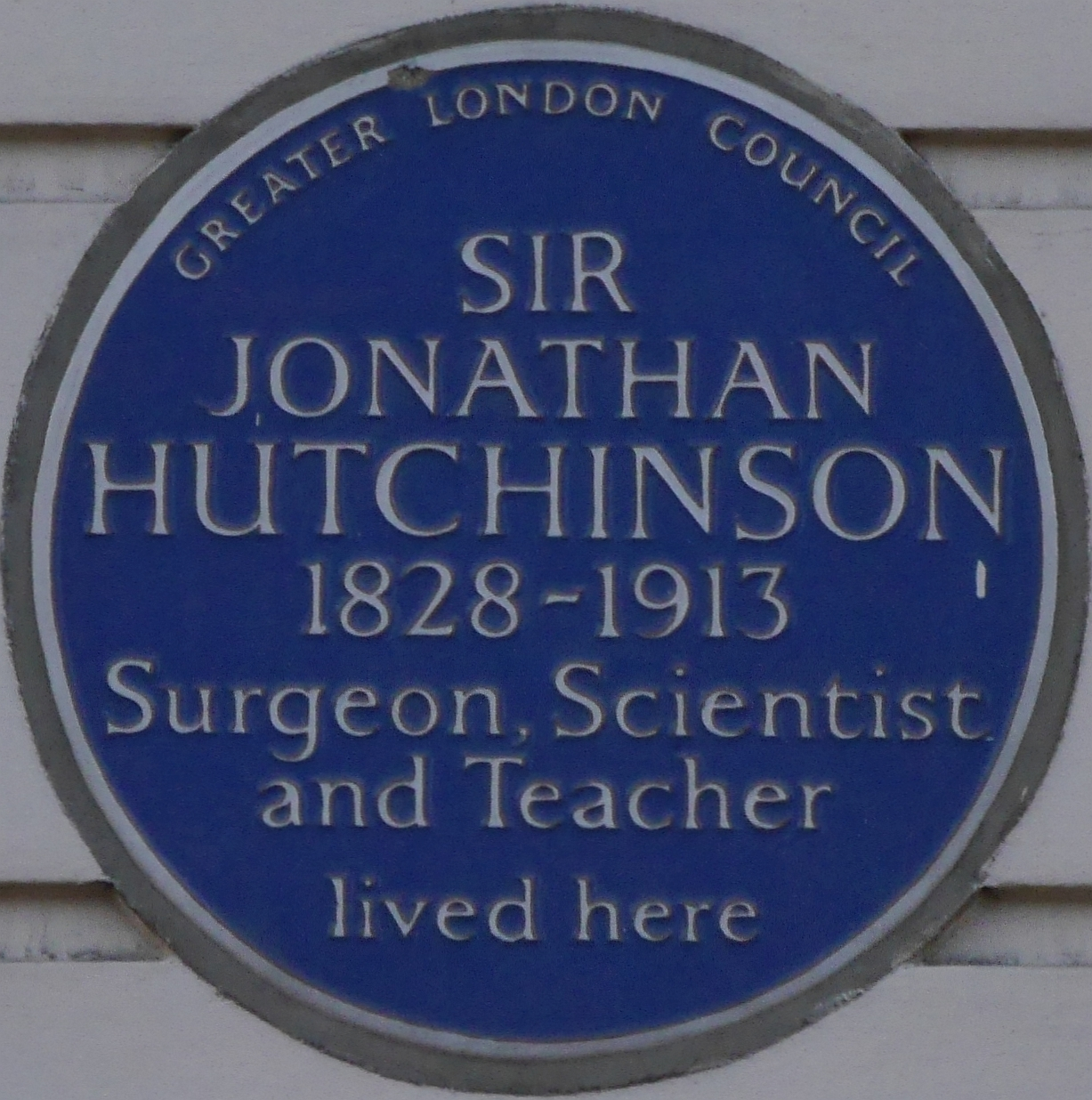
Blue plaque, 15 Cavendish Square, London

Hutchinson's activity in the cause of scientific surgery and in advancing the study of the natural sciences was unwearying. He published more than 1,200 medical articles and also produced the quarterly Archives of Surgery from 1890 to 1900, being its only contributor. His lectures on neuropathogenesis, gout, leprosy, diseases of the tongue, etc., were full of original observation; but his principal work was connected with the study of syphilis, on which he became the first living authority. He was the first to describe his triad of medical signs for congenital syphilis: notched incisor teeth, labyrinthine deafness, and interstitial keratitis, which was very useful for providing a firm diagnosis long before Treponema pallidum or the Wassermann test were discovered. By contrast, his insistence that leprosy was caused by eating decaying fish was incorrect.

He was the founder of the Medical Graduates’ College and Polyclinic; and both in his native town of Selby and at Haslemere, Surrey, he started (about 1890) educational museums for popular instruction in natural history. He published several volumes on his subjects and was given an Hon. LL.D degree by both the University of Glasgow and University of Cambridge. He received a knighthood in 1908.

Hutchinson has his name attached to these entities in medicine:

- Hutchinson's angina
- Hutchinson's sign
- Hutchinson's dehidrosis
- Hutchinson's disease or senile degeneration of the choroid
- Hutchinson's facies
- Hutchinson's melanotic freckle (was previously considered a precancerous spot occurring in old age, now known as melanoma in situ, lentigo maligna type)
- Hutchinson's mask
- Hutchinson's melanotic disease
- Hutchinson's patch (a corneal sign attached to syphilitic keratitis)
- Hutchinson's prurigo
- Hutchinson's pupil
- Hutchinson's teeth (seen in congenital syphilis)
- Hutchinson's triad
- Hutchinson–Gilford progeria syndrome

== Personal life ==
Hutchinson married Jane Pynsent West in 1856 and they had six sons and four daughters. His son Jonathan (1859–1933) became an ophthalmic surgeon and was elected F.R.C.S. in 1884. He founded Haslemere Educational Museum in 1888. The teacher, writer, and naturalist Margaret Hutchinson was his granddaughter. Hutchinson died on 23 June 1913, in Haslemere, Surrey.
