= George Higoumenakis =

Greek dermatologist

Georgios "George" Higoumenakis (1895–27 December 1983) was a Greek dermatologist born in Kastelli, Iraklion, Crete, Ottoman Empire. He was the first to describe Higoumenakis' sign.

== Career ==
Higoumenakis studied medicine at the Medical School of the National University of Athens. He then chose to become a dermatologist and went to France to study under Gaston Milian, a famous syphilologist, at the Hospital St. Louis.

He returned to Greece in 1924, became a member of the Medical Society of Athens and began practicing medicine privately. He aspired to pursue an academic career as well in the National University of Athens, but this never occurred, possibly due to conflicts with professors at the Medical School of Athens.

In 1927, he first described the unilateral enlargement of the sternoclavicular portion of the clavicle, seen in congenital syphilis. This became known as Higoumenakis' sign.

He became a director of the Department of Dermatology at the Evangelismos Hospital (the country's largest) and practised medicine until the 1940s.

Although he continued practising medicine, he also became involved with politics. From 1964 to 1967, he was a Member of the Greek Parliament, and eventually he became Minister of Health.

== Family ==
Konstanin G. Higoumenakis is his son. He is a dermatologist and a retired assistant professor of Dermatology from the National and Kapodistrian University of Athens.
