= Ernest William Swanton =

Ernest William Swanton may refer to:

- E. W. Swanton (1907–2000), English journalist
- Ernest William Swanton (mycologist) (1870–1958), English biologist
