= Henry Hugh Clutton =

English surgeon

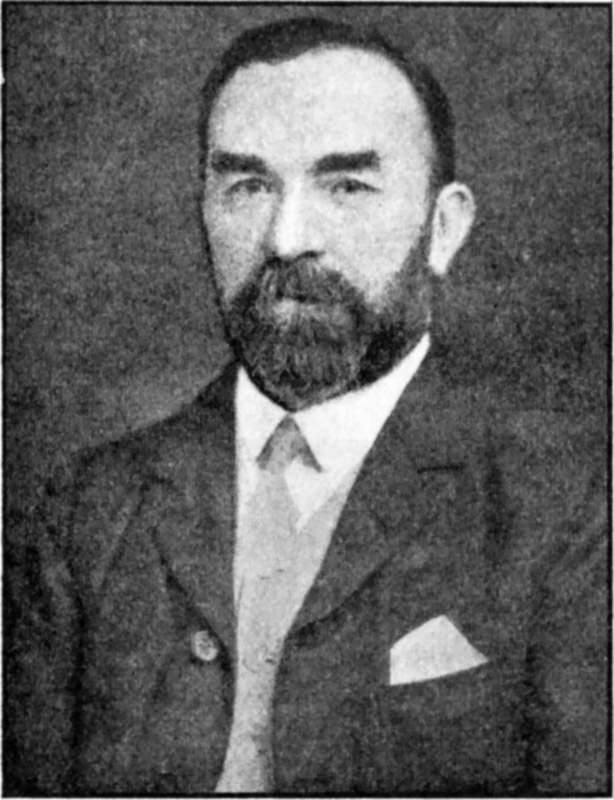
Henry Hugh Clutton

Henry Hugh Clutton (12 July 1850 – 9 November 1909) was an English surgeon who described painless symmetrical hydrarthrosis (an accumulation of water in the cavity of a joint), especially of the knee joints: seen in congenital syphilis. The ailment is called "Clutton's joints." He is commemorated by the Clutton Medal and Prize, awarded for excellence in Clinical Surgery at St Thomas's Hospital, King's College School of Medicine and Dentistry.

He was born in Saffron Walden, Essex, the son of Ralph Clutton, and educated at Marlborough College and Clare College, Cambridge.

He was elected the last President of the Clinical Society of London in 1905.

Clutton died at 2 Portland Place, London, and is buried there in Brompton Cemetery.
