= Margaret Hutchinson =

British writer

- Born: 18 December 1904; Haslemere, Surrey, England
- Died: 30 June 1997 (aged 92); Haslemere, Surrey, England
- Occupations: Teacher and writer
- Known for: Nature study

Margaret Massey Hutchinson (1904–1997) was an English educator, naturalist and writer of Haslemere, Surrey. She was closely involved with Haslemere Educational Museum which was founded by her grandfather Sir Jonathan Hutchinson and she established and ran a Froebel school in West Sussex for 25 years.

Hutchinson was a lifelong observer of nature, including a specialist study of plant galls, and had a particular interest in the education of children in the context of the natural world.

== Early life ==
Margaret Hutchinson was born on 18 December 1904 into a large Quaker family in Haslemere, Surrey, the fifth of nine children of Herbert Hutchinson and Elizabeth (Ella) Woods. Herbert's father was Sir Jonathan Hutchinson FRS, the eminent surgeon, to whom Margaret was also related on her mother's side.

Her early years were spent in an extremely rural environment where she developed a deep understanding of, and love for the natural world, something that would be a feature of her writing and teaching life. She described these first years in detail in her biography A Childhood in Edwardian Sussex: The making of a naturalist.

== Teacher, naturalist and writer ==
In 1931 Froebel-trained Hutchinson opened Yafflesmead School at the family home in Kingsley Green, near Haslemere, in which for 25 years she provided a Froebel Kindergarten education for boys and girls between 1931 and 1955. Close friend and editor Penny Hollow wrote:

"Many former pupils still have fond memories of Margaret Hutchinson and how she opened their eyes to the world around them".

David Kynaston quoted a parent in his book Austerity Britain:

"Yafflesmead is rather like home on a larger scale... cosy, no long corridors, no bleak classrooms".

A serious naturalist but with a keen sense of fun Margaret Hutchinson included the study of nature in all her teaching. Her first book Children as Naturalists was published in 1947 and gained her a wider reputation; the book sold for over 30 years and was favourably reviewed in Nature, the scientific journal.

Dr Evelyn Lawrence, Director of the National Froebel Foundation, said in her foreword to Children as Naturalists:

"...the circumstances in which Miss Hutchinson works are exceptional. Her classes are small, the school has large and very beautiful and varied grounds, and she herself is a scientifically trained and passionately enthusiastic naturalist."

Yafflesmead School closed in 1955 so that Hutchinson could care for her aged parents and was sold in 1957; subsequently she dedicated herself to writing and study.

She was active at Haslemere Educational Museum as committee member, Honorary Librarian and trustee, where she often enthused parties of local school children about nature. Penny Hollow, in a postscript to the centenary edition of Margaret Hutchinson's memoirs remembered:

"A tall and imposing figure, she was greatly respected and everyone at the Museum was slightly in awe of her, always ensuring that her requests (polite notes signed with the characteristic "MMH") were quickly acted upon."

Hutchinson was also a member of Haslemere Natural History Society for 74 years, wrote a column for the local newspaper, The Haslemere Herald, for over 20 years and contributed to journals.

In her 60s Hutchinson took up the study of plant galls (cecidology), soon becoming an expert and contributing to the Journal of the British Plant Gall Society. She continued the study until her last days, eventually donating her carefully indexed collection to the Haslemere Museum. Her journals and notebooks, covering nearly 80 years, are also at the Museum.

Margaret Hutchinson never married; she died on 30 June 1997, aged 92, in Haslemere. The updated re-issue of An Edwardian Childhood was published in 2003 to commemorate the centenary of her birth.

== Books ==
- Children as naturalists (George Allen & Unwin, 1947)
- A childhood in Edwardian Sussex: The making of a naturalist (Saiga Publishing, 1981 ISBN 0862300401)
- A childhood in Edwardian Sussex Revised (Triplegate, 1983 ISBN 0946474133)
- A review of the birds of the Haslemere district (with H Barlow, W Bond & P Davis, Haslemere Nat. Hist. Soc., 1968)
- The study of galls caused by insects (School Natural Science Society No. 32) (M J Wootton, 1968)
- Trolls and their relatives (Allen & Unwin, 1953)

What can you find...? series:

- In a wood (Educational Supply Association, 1952)
- In hedge and field (Educational Supply Association, 1955)
- Along a river bank (Educational Supply Association, 1960)

Making and keeping series:

- A bird table (Ward Lock Educational, 1957 ISBN 0706271025)
- A box garden (Ward Lock Educational, 1960 ISBN 0706271017)
- A vegetable garden (Ward Lock Educational, 1965 ISBN 0706271009)

Out of doors series:

- Exploring a park (Educational Supply Association, 1962)

National Froebel Foundation:

- From seed to seed: A simple gardening project with young children (1955)
- Practical nature study in town schools (1961)
