= Mulberry molar =

Deformity of rounded molar teeth, indicative of congenital syphilis

- Other names: Syphilitic permanent first molar
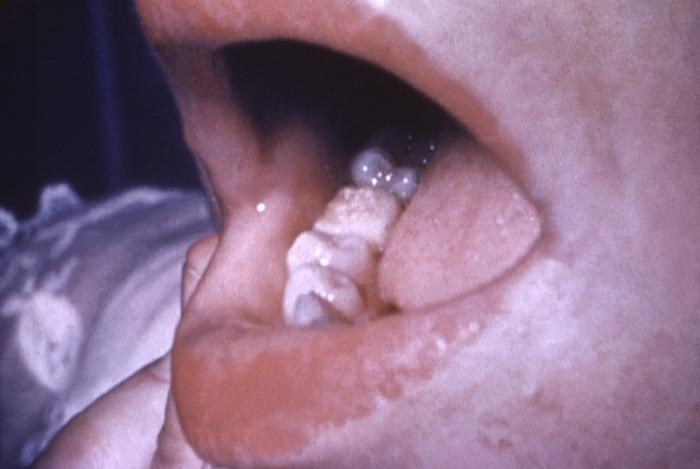
- Mulberry molar in congenital syphilis

Mulberry molars (also known as Moon or Fournier molars) are a dental condition usually associated with congenital syphilis, characterized by multiple rounded rudimentary enamel cusps on the permanent first molars. These teeth are functional but can be fixed with crowns, bridges, or implants.

Just above the gum line, the mulberry molar looks normal. A deformity becomes apparent towards the cusp or the top grinding surface of the tooth. Here, the size of the mulberry molar is diminished in all aspects, creating a stumpy version of a conventional molar. The cause of the molar atrophy is thought to be enamel hypoplasia, or a deficiency in tooth enamel. The underlying dentin and pulp of the tooth is normal, but the enamel covering or molar sheath is thin and deformed, creating a smaller version of a typical tooth.

The grinding surface of a mulberry molar is also corrupted. Normally, the grinding surface of a molar has a pit and is surrounded by a circular ridge at the top of the tooth, which is used for grinding. The cusp deformity of the mulberry molar is characterized by an extremely shallow or completely absent pit. Instead, the pit area is filled with globular structures bunched together all along the top surface of the cusp. This type of deformity is also thought to be caused by enamel hypoplasia. Mulberry molars are typically functional and do not need treatment. If the deformity is severe or the person is bothered by the teeth, there are several options. The teeth can be covered with a permanent cast crown or stainless steel crown or the molars can be removed and an implant or bridge can be put in place of the mulberry molar.

A mulberry molar is caused by congenital syphilis, which is passed from the mother to the child in the uterus through the placenta. Since this particular symptom of congenital syphilis manifests later in childhood with the eruption of the permanent molars, it is a late-stage marker for the disease. Hutchinson's teeth, marked by dwarfed teeth and deformed cusps that are spaced abnormally far apart, are another dental deformity caused by congenital syphilis. Mulberry molars and Hutchinson's teeth will often occur together. Pregnant women with syphilis should tell their doctors about the condition and be treated for it during pregnancy; otherwise, the baby should be screened for the disease after birth and treated with penicillin if it is necessary.

== See also ==
- List of cutaneous conditions
