= Du Bois sign =

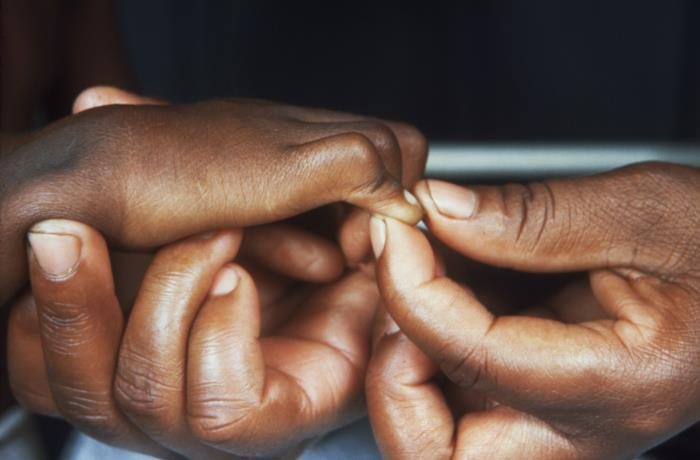
- Short little finger - du Bois sign
- Symptoms: Shortened little finger
- Differential diagnosis: Congenital syphilis

The du Bois sign is a medical finding of shortness of the little finger in congenital syphilis.
