= Inheritance (Munch) =

1897–1899 painting by Edvard Munch

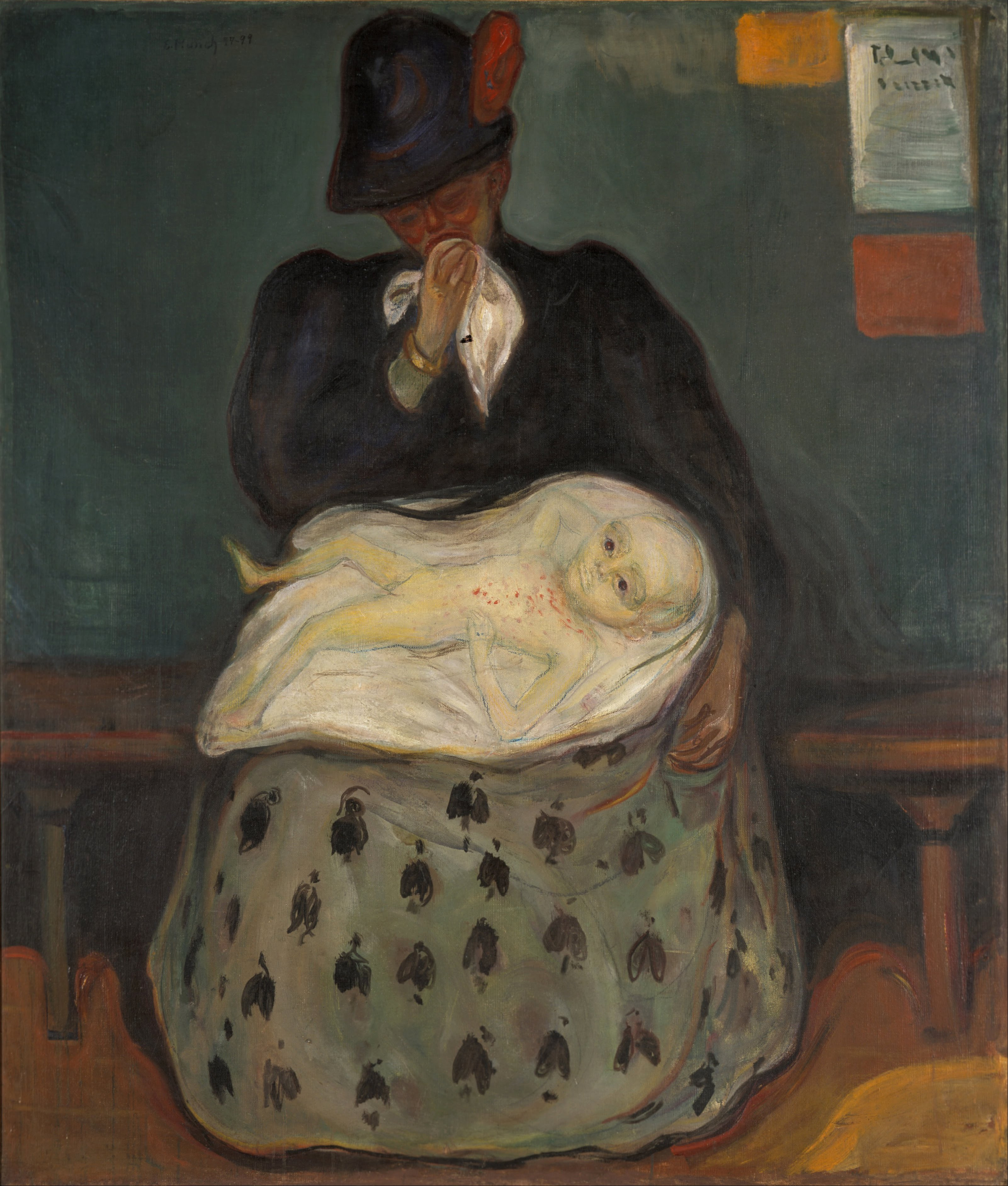
- Artist: Edvard Munch
- Year: 1897–1899
- Medium: Oil on canvas
- Dimensions: 141 cm × 120 cm (56 in × 47 in)
- Location: Munch Museum; Oslo

Inheritance (Norwegian: Arv; 1897–1899) is an oil painting on canvas created by the Norwegian painter Edvard Munch (1863–1944). It portrays a syphilitic mother holding her child, born with congenital syphilis. Munch completed the work after visiting the Hôpital Saint-Louis in Paris, where he saw a woman crying for her child with the disease.

The baby in the painting is lifeless, pale and covered in spots. The mother, whose hands and patterned skirt are especially prominent, has a tearful red face and sits on a bench in front of a green background.

The critical response to the painting was one of surprise; discussing sexually transmitted disease in public was unacceptable at the time. In addition, the artist had portrayed a distortion of the traditional artistic subject of the Madonna and Child.

== Background ==
Edvard Munch was a Norwegian artist whose mother, sister and paternal grandfather had been affected by tuberculosis. Munch completed an oil painting on canvas in the late 1890s based on what he witnessed during a visit to the Hôpital Saint-Louis in Paris, one of three hospitals in that city that took in people with syphilis. In its museum his attention was drawn to a wax model of a baby with congenital syphilis. He also saw a woman crying for her child with venereal disease. The resulting painting, now known as Inheritance, was originally titled The Syphilitic Child. (Note: Nineteenth-century physicians believed that congenital syphilis, then called hereditary syphilis, was acquired from semen ("semen inheritance") at the time of conception, and that the unborn baby then transmitted it to the mother via the placenta. This false theory was used to explain why the mother was typically without symptoms until after childbirth. Tests for syphilis were not developed until 1906 and it was later found that treating a pregnant woman for syphilis prevented congenital syphilis in her baby.)

== The painting ==
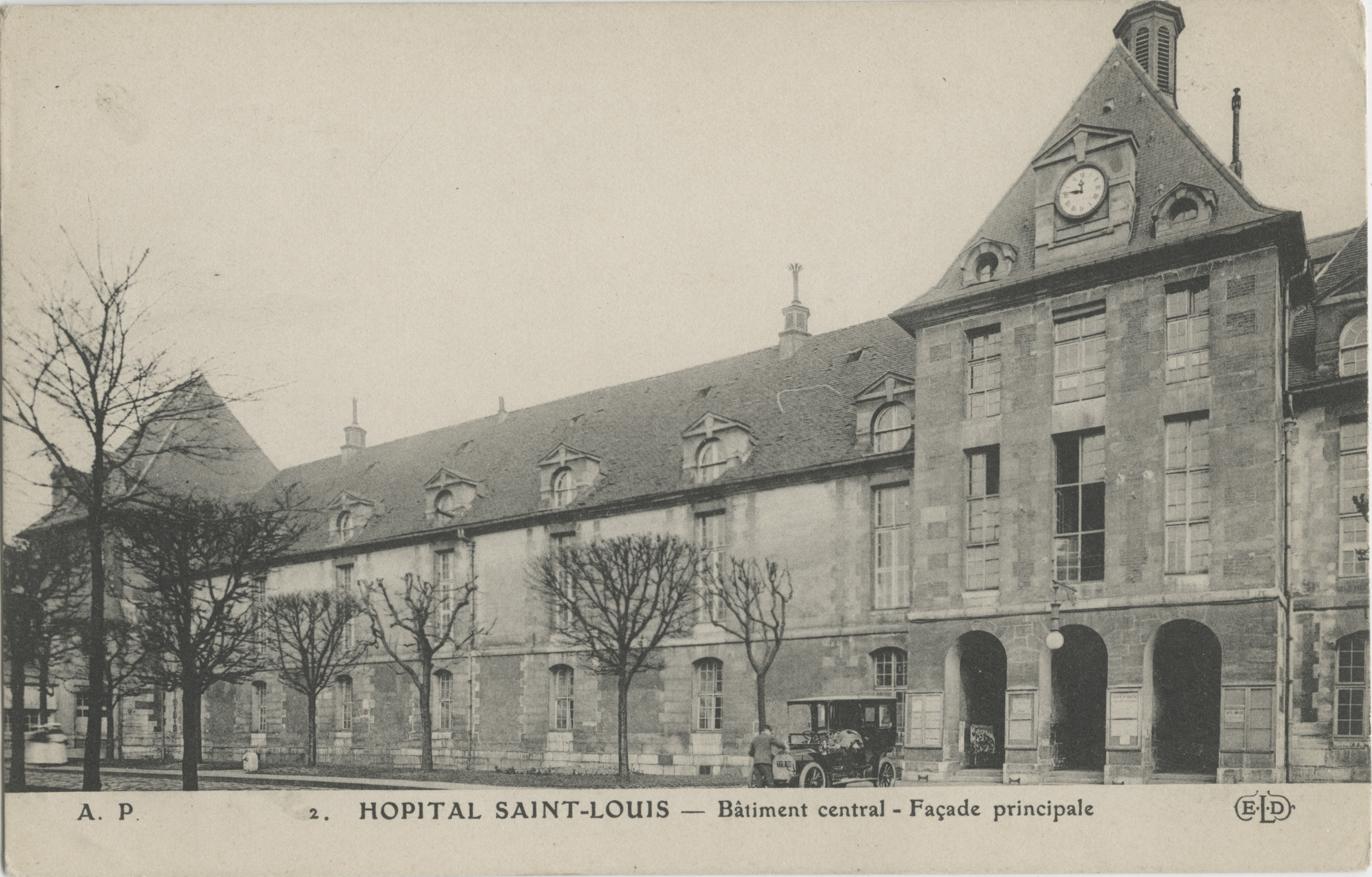
The Hôpital Saint-Louis

The work is housed at the Munch Museum, in Oslo, Norway. It measures 141 cm by 120 cm.

The painting depicts a baby affected by congenital syphilis lying in the arms of its mother, who sits on a bench in front of a green background. The infant is portrayed as lifeless, pale, yellow, and covered in spots. Its body parts are out of proportion and the eyes wide open. The mother's hands and patterned skirt are specifically prominent. She is crying and has a red face. Her jacket is plain black and there is a bright red feather in her hat. Munch stated he saw a woman "crying in the hospital of venereal disease", but does not clarify whether the syphilitic woman in the painting transmitted syphilis to her baby via an unfaithful husband or from her own sex work.

== Munch ==
Munch's own description of the image was as follows:

The woman bends over the child which is infected by the sins of the fathers. It lies in the lap of the mother. The mother bends over it and weeps so that her face becomes scarlet red. The red, tear-swollen, distorted face contrasts strongly with the linen white face of the child and the green background. The child stares with big, deep eyes at a world into which it has come involuntarily. Sick, anxious, and questioning does it look out into the room, wondering about the land of agony into which it has entered, asking, already. Why—why?

Munch was at the time affected by a decline in his mental health. Like the baby in the image he felt that he too had entered the world in a sick state.

== Reception ==
The reaction to the painting in the late nineteenth century was one of surprise. Discussing sexually transmitted disease in public was unacceptable at the time on moral grounds. It has been described as shocking even in the 21st century. In addition, the artist had portrayed an inversion of the traditional artistic subject of the Madonna and Child.

== See also ==
- List of paintings by Edvard Munch
