= Hutchinson's mask =

Medical sensation

Hutchinson's mask is an individual's sensation that the face is covered with a mask or a gauzy network like cobwebs. This medical sign is associated with tabes dorsalis affecting the trigeminal nerve (fifth cranial nerve CN V). It is named in honour of the English physician Sir Jonathan Hutchinson (1828–1913).

Subjective sensations of various kinds, as numbness, pins and needles, formication, a cold trickling feeling in the skin, a feeling in the soles of the feet of walking on putty, wool, or velvet may be complained of. In rare cases Hutchinson's mask, due to affection of the fifth, occurs. The patient says his face feels stiff, and he feels as if it were covered by a cobweb.
