= Hutchinson's patch =

Clinical sign

Hutchinson's patch (or salmon patch of Hutchinson) is a dull orangish-pink area (generally without clear boundaries) on the cornea, most often found at the periphery of the cornea. The sign is an indication of interstitial (or parenchymatous) keratitis, causing corneal neovascularisation.

Blood vessels derived from the ciliary vessels are thickly set in the layers of the cornea and produce a dull red color—"the salmon patch of Hutchinson." These patches may be small and crescent-shaped, or large and sector-like.

It is named after the English physician Jonathan Hutchinson (1828–1913).
