= Hutchinson's facies =

- Differential diagnosis: Neurosyphilis

Hutchinson's facies is a facial appearance involving drooping eyelids and immobile eyes in external ophthalmoplegia. This sign is associated with neurosyphilis. It is named in honour of the English physician Jonathan Hutchinson (1828–1913).

When the ophthalmoplegia is complete, the physiognomy of the patient has a special character, known as Hutchinson's facies. The eyelids are half closed, so that the patient appears to be asleep; they partially cover the cornea. As the patient tries to remedy the blepharoptosis by contraction of the frontalis muscle, the brow is wrinkled and the eyebrows are arched. If the upper eyelids are raised, the eyeballs are immobile, "as though formed of wax" (Benedikt). When the paralysis affects all the external muscles, the eyes are directed straight forwards. The look is, however, somewhat vague, because the optical axes are not absolutely parallel.
