= Pneumonia alba =

Medical condition

Pneumonia alba (white pneumonia) is often seen in neonates with congenital syphilis. The lung may be firm and pale, owing to the presence of inflammatory cells and fibrosis in the alveolar septa. Spirochetes are readily demonstrable in tissue sections.

== See also ==
- Congenital syphilis
- Pneumonia
