= Haslemere Educational Museum =

Museum in Surrey, England

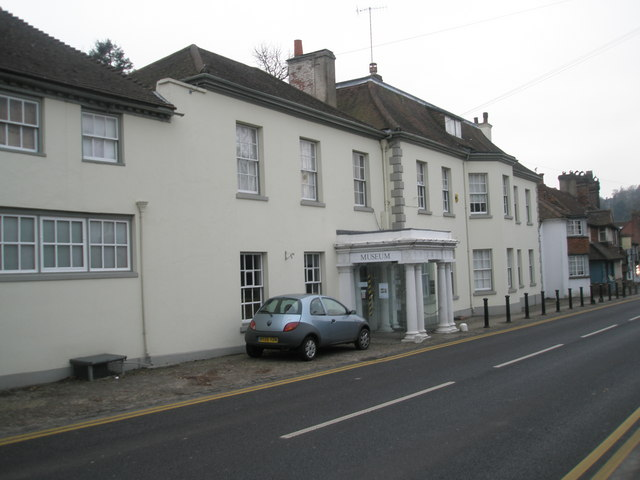
- Haslemere Educational Museum, 2009

- Location within Surrey
- Established: 1888; 138 years ago
- Location: Haslemere, Surrey, United Kingdom
- Coordinates: 51.090°N 0.712°W
- Website: Haslemere Educational Museum

Haslemere Educational Museum was founded in 1888 by the eminent surgeon Sir Jonathan Hutchinson to display his growing collection of natural history specimens. After two moves it found in 1926 a permanent home in Haslemere High Street, in the town of Haslemere, Surrey, England.

The museum won a national award in 2012 and is an independent charity. It contains nearly half a million specimens, artefacts, papers and images.

== History ==
Already a successful surgeon with homes in London and Haslemere, Sir Jonathan Hutchinson was also keenly interested in the full spectrum of science and nature. At the farm that was his home in Haslemere he had already amassed a large collection of specimens and fossils collected on his travels, and in 1888 he opened a museum in the outbuildings, encouraging a then-revolutionary 'hands-on' approach. By 1895 the expanding collection needed larger premises, and was moved to what is now Museum Hill. Hutchinson himself lectured at the museum and before he died in 1913 he left money for repairs and enlargement. The museum moved to its present location in Haslemere High Street in 1926.

A Museum Examination for children was established in 1899 and a primary function of the museum was always to be education.

The curator of the museum for more than 50 years from 1897 to 1948 was Ernest William Swanton. Swanton was a mycologist, and author of Fungi and How to Know Them (1909); he helped and encouraged many would-be mycologists.

John Clegg was curator from 1949 to 1962. He was a writer and photographer with a keen interest in pond life, and wrote the book on this topic for the Observer series of pocket guides. He also wrote The Freshwater Life of the British Isles.

Clegg was succeeded by his assistant curator Arthur Jewell. Jewell had joined the museum from school in 1974 and retired in 2008, and the museum's Education Room is named in his honour. Arthur, a stuffed Siberian bear and a museum mascot, is also named after him.

Among the many active members of the museum during the 20th century was naturalist Margaret Hutchinson, Sir Jonathan's granddaughter, who was some-time honorary librarian, committee member and trustee. Another volunteer, Penny Hollow, who celebrated 40 years at the museum in 2009 having started after leaving school, in a postscript to the centenary edition of Margaret Hutchinson's memoirs remembered:

"A tall and imposing figure, she was greatly respected and everyone at the Museum was slightly in awe of her, always ensuring that her requests (polite notes signed with the characteristic "MMH") were quickly acted upon."

At the time of her 40-years celebration, Hollow noted of the museum:

"There is a wonderful camaraderie and independence, a unique combination with everyone, staff and volunteers, working together."

In 2011, the museum suffered the theft of a horned rhinoceros skull with a black market value estimated to be £60,000. The perpetrators were apprehended following an appeal on the BBC's Crimewatch programme and two men were jailed in 2013. There was a spate of similar thefts of rhinoceros horn from museums.

In 2012, the museum won the Sunday Telegraph Family Friendly Museums Award from over 600 nominations.

The museum celebrated its 125th anniversary in 2013, attended by Sophie, Countess of Wessex.

== Exhibits ==
The three main galleries cover geology, natural history and human history, and contain some 240,000 specimens and 140,000 artefacts from around the world. There are also textile and fine art exhibits.

The reference library covers the whole spectrum of science and history with about 7,000 books, 13,500 scientific and historical periodicals and over 22,000 documents, largely but not exclusively relating to the local area. There are also more than 2,000 maps and about 35,000 photographic images dating from the museum's foundation to the present day.

The museum is home to the mummy of Pa-Er-Abu, believed to be an Egyptian priest who died around 300BC.

== Other features ==
As well as the collections and interactive exhibits within the museum building there are extensive grounds, including a herb garden, pond, meadow and woodland featuring a large variety of wild plants which in turn attract wildlife. There is an observation beehive.

The museum has facilities for exhibitions and runs regular workshops, courses and lectures for people of all ages, as well as providing outreach visits to schools and community groups.

With the help of the Heritage Lottery Fund, the museum is establishing online databases and enabled the employment of a full-time professional education specialist.

The museum and Haslemere Natural History Society (HNHS) are closely associated; the museum's library includes some of HNHS's reference works, and HNHS holds talks at the museum during the winter.

Patrons of the museum (2025) include politicians Baroness Virginia Bottomley and Sir Jeremy Hunt MP, Chairman of the British Council Sir Vernon Ellis, lifelong supporter of museums Loyd Grossman and former Poet Laureate Sir Andrew Motion. There is a considerable educational and corporate patronage. Professor David Bellamy in his book A Natural Life declared the museum to be his favourite when a child.

The museum hosts the Haslemere Visitor and Local Information Centre.
