= Higouménakis' sign =

- Differential diagnosis: Congenital syphilis

Higouménakis' sign is a unilateral enlargement of the sternoclavicular portion of the right clavicle, seen in congenital syphilis.

The sign was named for George Higoumenakis, who first described it in 1927 in the Greek periodical Proceedings of the Medical Society of Athens (Πρακτικά Ιατρικής Εταιρείας Αθηνών). He subsequently published the description of the sign in a German article, making it more known among dermatologists.

== See also ==
- List of cutaneous conditions

== Bibliography ==
- Higoumenakis KG: Higoumenakis's sign and its significance for the diagnosis of congenital syphilis. Dermatologische Wochenschrift 154(30):697-705 (1968).
- Higoumenakis G: A new stigma of hereditary syphilis. Proceedings of the Medical Society of Athens. 687-699 (1927). [in Greek]
- Higoumenakis G: Neues Stigma der kongenitalen Lues. Die Vergrößerung des sternalen Endes des Rechten Schlüsselbeins, seine Beschreibung, Deutung and Ätiologie. Deutsche Zeitschrift für Nervenheilkunde. 114(4):288-299 (1930).
- Frangos CC, Frangos CC: George Higoumenakis (1895–1983): Greek dermatologist. Journal of Medical Biography 17(2):64-72 (2009).
- Frangos CC, Frangos CC: George Higoumenakis (1895–1983), Dermatologist: The Tale of 'Higoumenakis Sign' in Congenital Syphilis and His Life Achievements. Analecta Historico Medica (Supplement 1-part III):133-137 (2008).
- Φράγκος ΚΧ: Γέωργιος Κ. Ηγουμενάκης. BioMedResearch.gr, Ιούνιος 2009.
