= Saber shin =

Sharp anterior bowing, or convexity, of the tibia

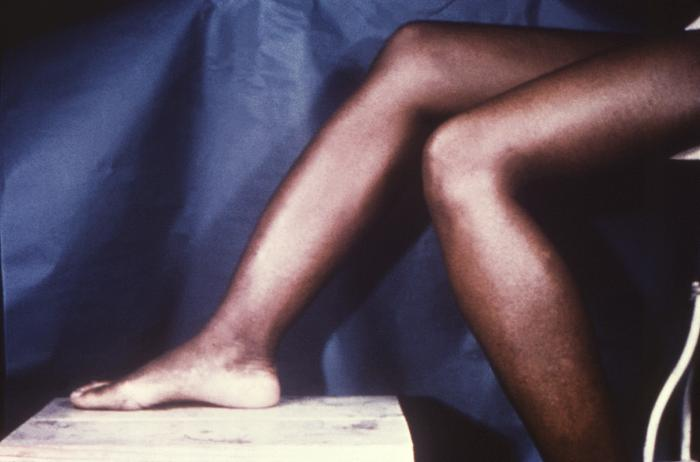
- Saber shin in congenital syphilis
- Specialty: Orthopedics

Saber shin is a malformation of the tibia. It presents as a sharp anterior bowing, or convexity, of the tibia.

== Causes ==
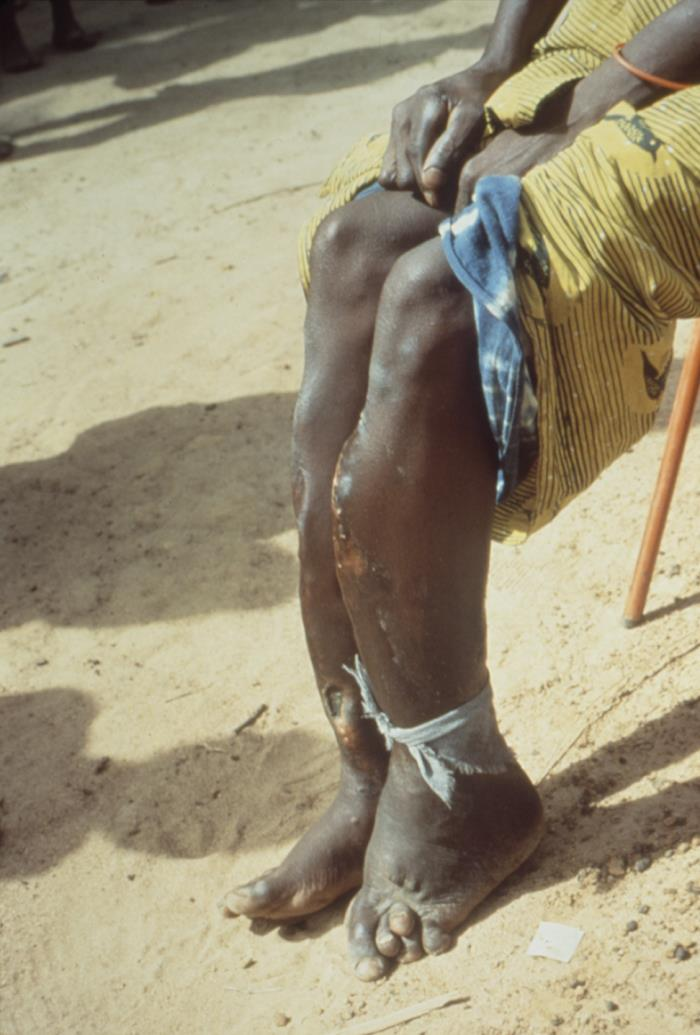
Saber shin in late tertiary yaws

Periosteal reaction along the shaft of the tibia. It can result from congenital syphilis, yaws, Paget's disease of bone, vitamin D deficiency or Weismann-Netter–Stuhl syndrome. It can be due to osteomalacia.

== Etymology ==
Saber refers to the tibia's resemblance to the curve of a saber sword.

== See also ==
- Saddle nose
- List of cutaneous conditions
- Rickets

== Bibliography ==
- Mosby's Medical, Nursing, & Allied Health Dictionary. Edition 5, 1998 p7B49.
