= Hutchinson's pupil =

- Differential diagnosis: Intracranial mass lesion

Hutchinson's pupil is a clinical sign in which the pupil on the side of an intracranial mass lesion is dilated and unreactive to light, due to compression of the oculomotor nerve on that side. The sign is named after Sir Jonathan Hutchinson. These can be due to concussion injury to the brain and is associated with subdural haemorrhage and unconsciousness. The parasympathetic fibers to the pupil are responsible for pupillary constriction. The fibers pass through the periphery of the oculomotor nerve, and hence are the first to be affected in case of compression of the nerve. In Stage 1, the parasympathetic fibers on the side of injury are irritated, leading to constriction of pupil on that side. In stage 2, the parasympathetic fibers on the side of injury are paralysed, leading to dilatation of pupil. The fibers on the opposite oculomotor nerve are irritated, leading to constriction on opposite side. In stage 3, the parasympathetic fibers on both sides are paralysed - leading to bilateral pupillary dilatation. Pupils become fixed. This indicates grave prognosis.
