= Clutton's joints =

Symptom of syphilis

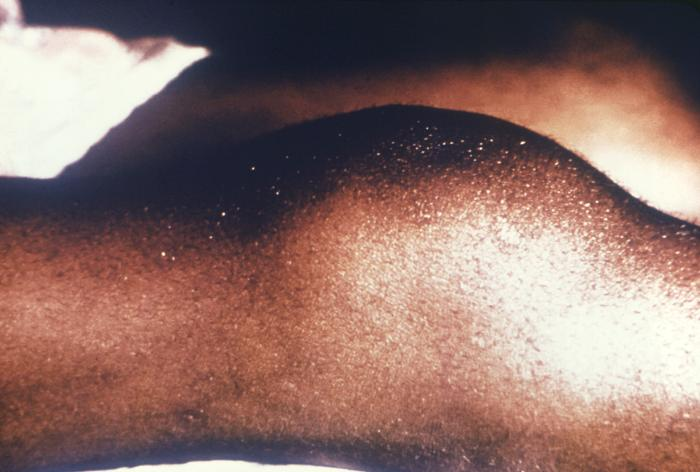
- Clutton's joints
- Specialty: Rheumatology
- Differential diagnosis: Congenital syphilis

Clutton's joints is a term describing the finding of symmetrical joint swelling seen in congenital syphilis. It most commonly affects the knees, presenting with synovitis and joint effusions (collections of fluid within the joint capsules) lasting up to a year. It has also been reported affecting the ankles, elbows, wrists and fingers. It is usually painless, although pain in the absence of trauma can occur in a few cases. There is usually no disability associated with the joint swelling, and recovery is usually complete. It occurs between 5 and 20 years of age in both sexes.The condition was described in 1886 by Henry Hugh Clutton in The Lancet.
