= Ernest William Swanton (mycologist) =

British botanist and mycologist (1870–1958)

Ernest William Brockton Swanton OBE (28 June 1870, Dibden – 21 October 1958, Twickenham) was an English mycologist, botanist, conchologist, naturalist, antiquarian, and museum curator. He was the president of the British Mycological Society for the academic year 1915–1916 and the president of the Conchological Society of Great Britain and Ireland in 1921.

== Biography ==
After an early career as a schoolmaster and private tutor, Swanton was appointed in 1897 the curator of the Haslemere Educational Museum. He retired as curator in 1948.

In 1898 Swanton began giving regular series of lessons in natural history to children from the local elementary schools. He illustrated the lessons by handing around specimens from his museum's collections. In 1899 he established a Haslemere Educational Museum Examination for local children after their preparation for several months by studying the museum's galleries.

In 1898 Swanton was one of the founding members of the British Mycological Society. He was known primarily as a field mycologist, although he had a wide range of interests in natural history and antiquarian studies, including plant galls. He wrote several books. His 1909 book Fungi and How to Know Them was a useful and popular handbook and had a 2nd edition in 1922. He edited, with the aid of P. Woods, C.B., the book Bygone Haslemere: A Short History of the Ancient Borough and Its Immediate Neighbourhood from Its Earliest Times (1914, West, Newman & Co.).

On the 27th of September 1916 he gave the British Mycological Society's presidential address, entitled Education in Mycology. In 1920 he was elected an Associate of the Linnean Society of London. He was appointed M.B.E. in 1936 and O.B.E. in 1948. He was granted a Civil List pension in 1949.

He and his wife hosted many forays of the British Mycological Society in the Haslemere district. He frequently acknowledged the help she gave him in museum work. She died in 1957.

His papers and botanical specimens are stored at the Haslemere Educational Museum.

== Selected publications ==
=== Articles ===
- Swanton, E. W. (1911). "The Fox and the Goose". Nature. 86 (2162): 178. Bibcode:1911Natur..86..178S. doi:10.1038/086178a0. S2CID 3943154.
- —— (1913). "Cavities in Stones". Nature. 91 (2264): 59. Bibcode:1913Natur..91Q..59S. doi:10.1038/091059a0. S2CID 3943205.
- —— (1922). "Defoliation of Oaks". Nature. 110 (2755): 250. Bibcode:1922Natur.110..250S. doi:10.1038/110250a0. S2CID 4087032.

=== Books and monographs ===
- Swanton, Ernest W. (1900). Annotated guide of edible British fungi. Lockwood, Huddersfield: The Museum Press. abstract
- —— (1903). A preliminary list of Haslemere fungi. Haslemere Microscope and Natural History Society.
- —— (1906). A pocket guide to the British non-marine Mollusca, including fossil forms which occur in the post-pliocene deposits, excepting the forest bed series. Lockwood, Huddersfield: Charles Mosley. abstract
- —— (1909). Fungi and how to Know Them: An Introduction to Field Mycology. London: Methuen & Co.
- —— (1912). The Mollusca of Somerset: Land, Freshwater, Estuarine and Marine. Taunton: Somersetshire Archæological and Natural History Society.
- —— (1912). British Plant-galls: A Classified Textbook of Cecidology. London: Methuen & Co.
- —— (1947). A country museum : the rise and progress of Sir Johnathon Hutchinson's educational museum at Haslemere. Haslemere Educational Museum; xvi+156 pages
- —— (1958). Yew Trees of England. Farnham, Surrey: The Herald Press.
