= Hutchinson's teeth =

Deformity of smaller, spaced-out teeth indicative of congenital syphilis

- Other names: Hutchinson's incisor, Hutchinson's sign or Hutchinson-Boeck teeth
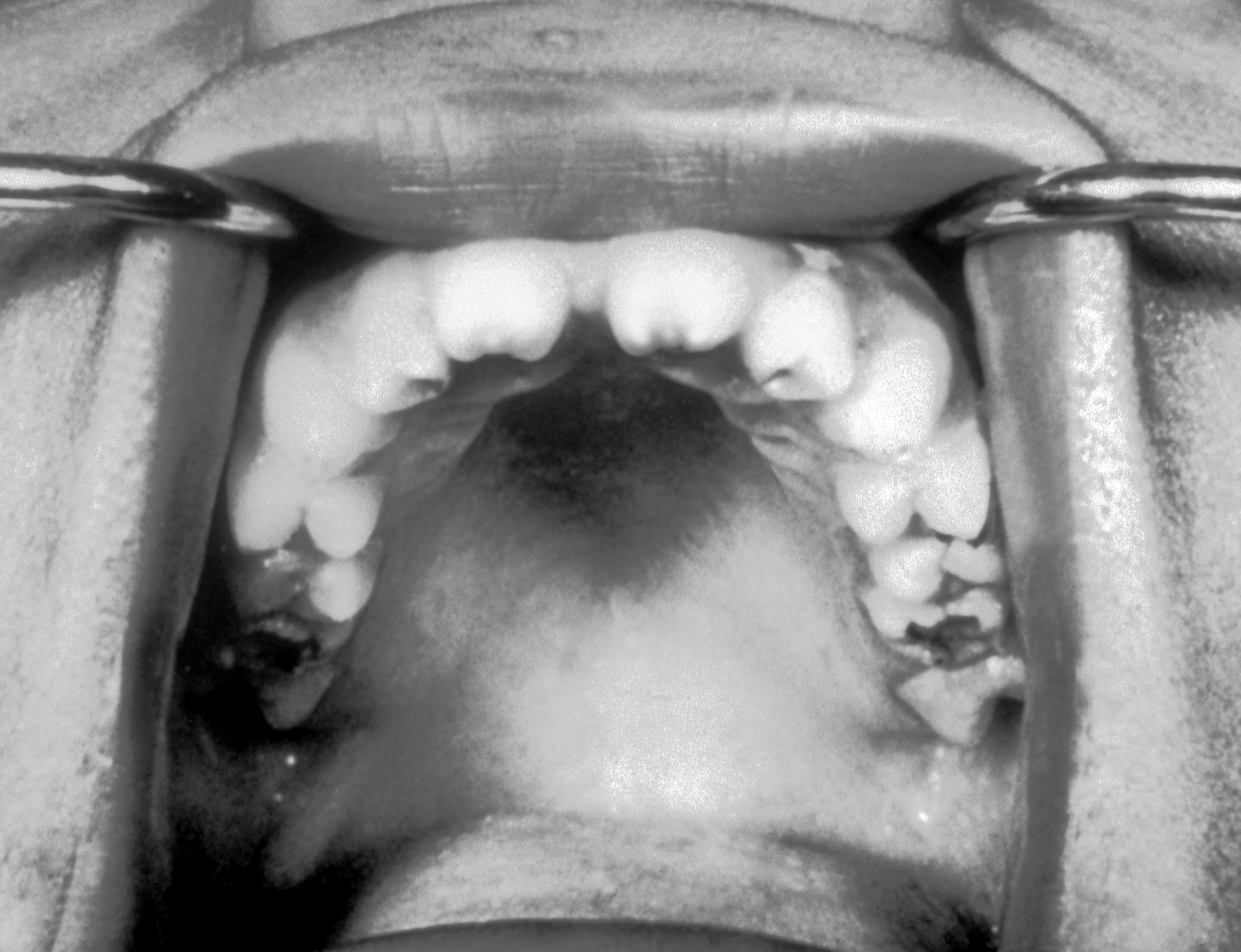
- Notched incisors known as Hutchinson's teeth which are characteristic of congenital syphilis

Hutchinson's teeth is a sign of congenital syphilis. Affected people have teeth that are smaller and more widely spaced than normal and which have notches on their biting surfaces.

It arises from an inflammatory reaction to the treponema pallidum bacteria, which disrupts crown formation during the development of the adult teeth, long before they erupt. It does not affect the milk teeth.

It is named for Sir Jonathan Hutchinson, a British surgeon and pathologist, who first described it. Hutchinson's teeth form part of Hutchinson's triad.

== See also ==
- List of cutaneous conditions
