= Saddle nose =

Loss of height of the human nose

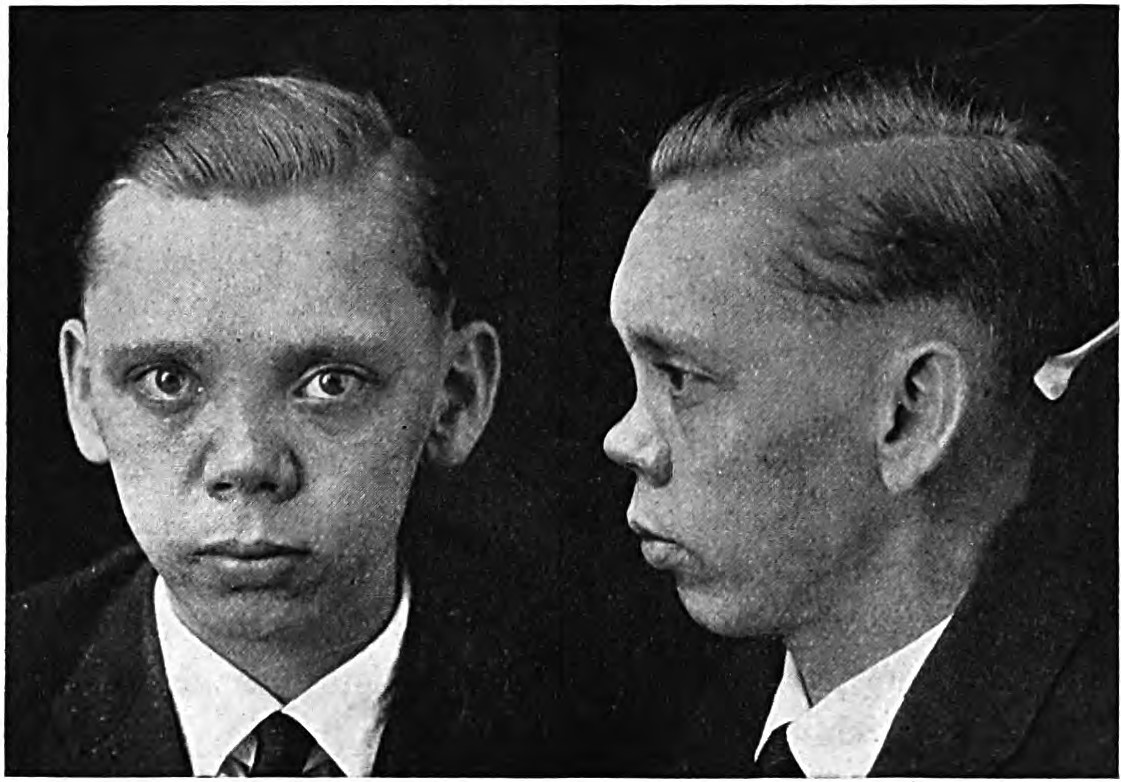
- Saddle nose in heredosyphilis
- Specialty: Plastic surgery

Saddle nose is a condition associated with nasal trauma, congenital syphilis, relapsing polychondritis, granulomatosis with polyangiitis, cocaine abuse, and leprosy, among other conditions. The most common cause is nasal trauma. It is characterized by a loss of height of the nose, because of the collapse of the nasal bridge. The depressed nasal dorsum may involve bony, cartilaginous, or both bony and cartilaginous components of the nasal dorsum.

It can usually be corrected with augmentation rhinoplasty by filling the dorsum of the nose with cartilage, bone or synthetic implant. If the depression is only cartilaginous, cartilage is taken from the nasal septum or auricle and laid in single or multiple layers. If the deformity involves both cartilage and bone, cancellous bone from iliac crest is the best replacement. Autografts are preferred over allografts. Saddle deformity can also be corrected by synthetic implants of teflon or silicone, but they are likely to be extruded.

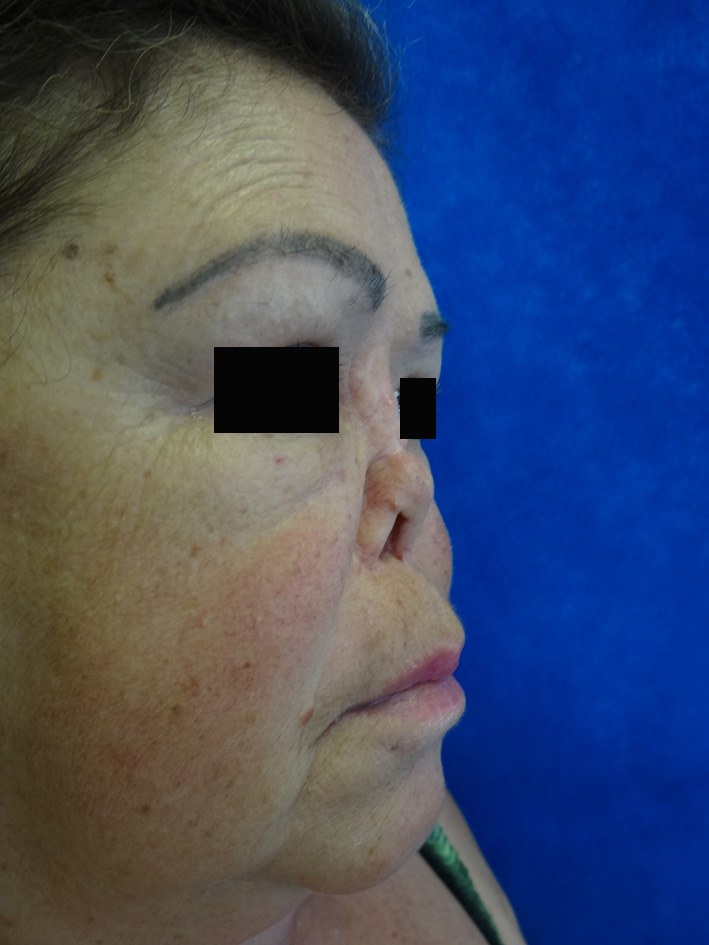
Lateral view of the face with a saddle nose deformity far up on the bridge due to granulomatosis with polyangiitis

== See also ==
- Saber shin
- List of cutaneous conditions
