= Interstitial keratitis =

Scarring of the eye's cornea due to chronic inflammation of the corneal stroma

- Specialty: Ophthalmology

Interstitial keratitis (IK), also known as Immune Stromal Keratitis (ISK), is an eye disorder characterized by scarring of the cornea due to chronic inflammation of the corneal stroma (keratitis). "Interstitial" refers to space between cells (i.e. the corneal stroma, which lies between the epithelium and the endothelium).

== Signs and symptoms ==
Acutely, early symptoms include a painful, photophobic, red watery eye. This is due to active corneal inflammation resulting in vascular invasion and stromal necrosis which can be diffuse or localized. This causes the pinkish discoloration of what was a clear transparent normal corneal tissue (called Salmon patch of Hutchinson).

Such vascularization is likely to result in blurring of vision secondary to corneal stromal scarring, the presence of ghost vessels, and thinning of the cornea, especially if it involves the visual axis.

== Cause ==
By far the most common cause of IK is syphilitic disease. However, there are two possible causes of the corneal inflammatory response: an infection and/or an immunological response, such as a hypersensitivity type reaction, or (rarely) Cogan syndrome. Infectious causes include syphilis (commonest), followed by other bacterial infections (TB, Leprosy and Lyme disease) and parasitic infections (Acanthamoeba, Onchocerciasis or river blindness, Leishmaniasis, Trypanosoma cruzi or Chagas disease, Trypanosoma brucei or African sleeping sickness and microsporidia)

== Pathophysiology ==
The corneal scarring is the result of the initial invasion of blood vessels into the corneal stroma as part of the inflammatory response. Since normal corneal tissue should be avascular (no blood vessel) and therefore clear to allow light to pass, the presence of blood vessel and the infiltration of cells as part of the inflammatory process results in scarring or hazing of the cornea.

== Diagnosis ==
A positive VDRL of Treponema pallidum immobilization test confirms diagnosis of luetic(syphilitic) interstitial keratitis

== Treatment ==
The underlying cause must be treated as soon as possible to stop the disease process. Corticosteroid drop can be used to minimize the scarring on the cornea along with antibiotic cover. However, residual scarring cannot be avoided which can result in long term visual impairment and corneal transplantation is not suitable due to high rejection rate from the corneal vascularization.

== History ==
Previous long-standing eye infection which possibly during childhood time recalled as being treated with antibiotic and/or hospitalized over long period of time.
