= History of syphilis =

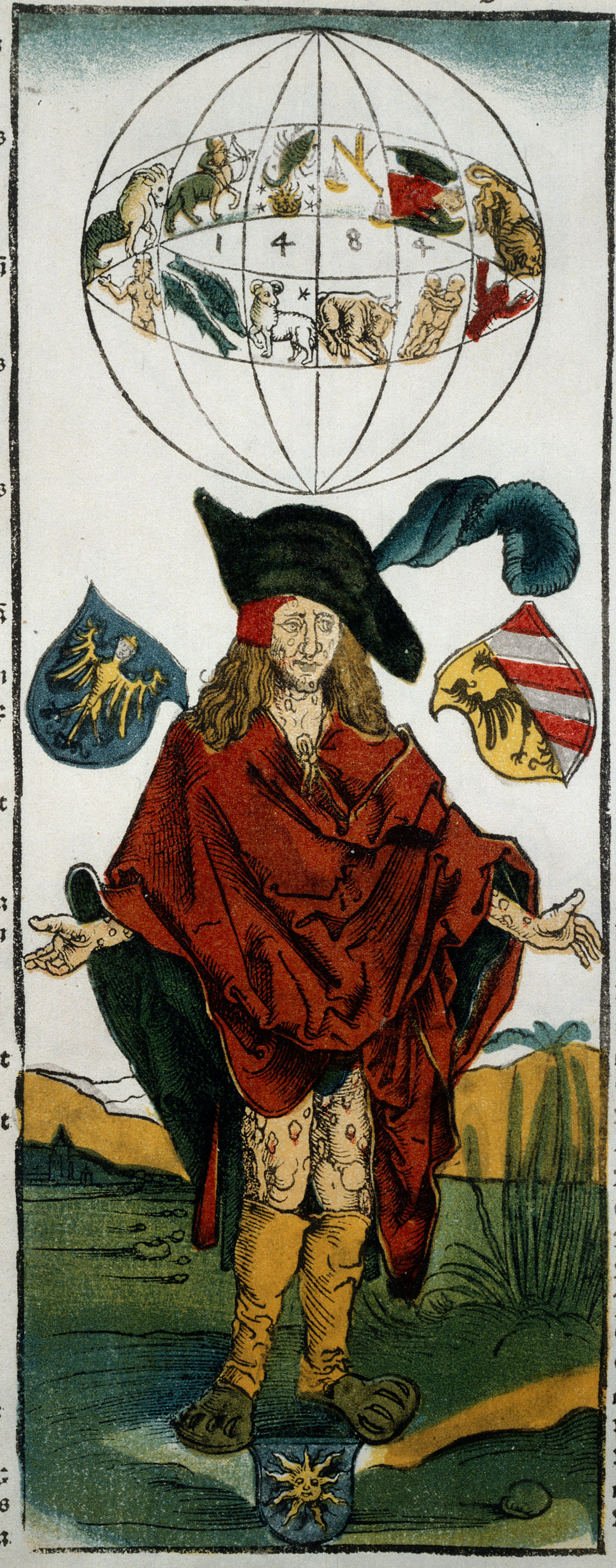
Syphilitic Man, Albrecht Dürer, 1496, with "1484" appearing. Here, the disease is believed to have astrological causes.

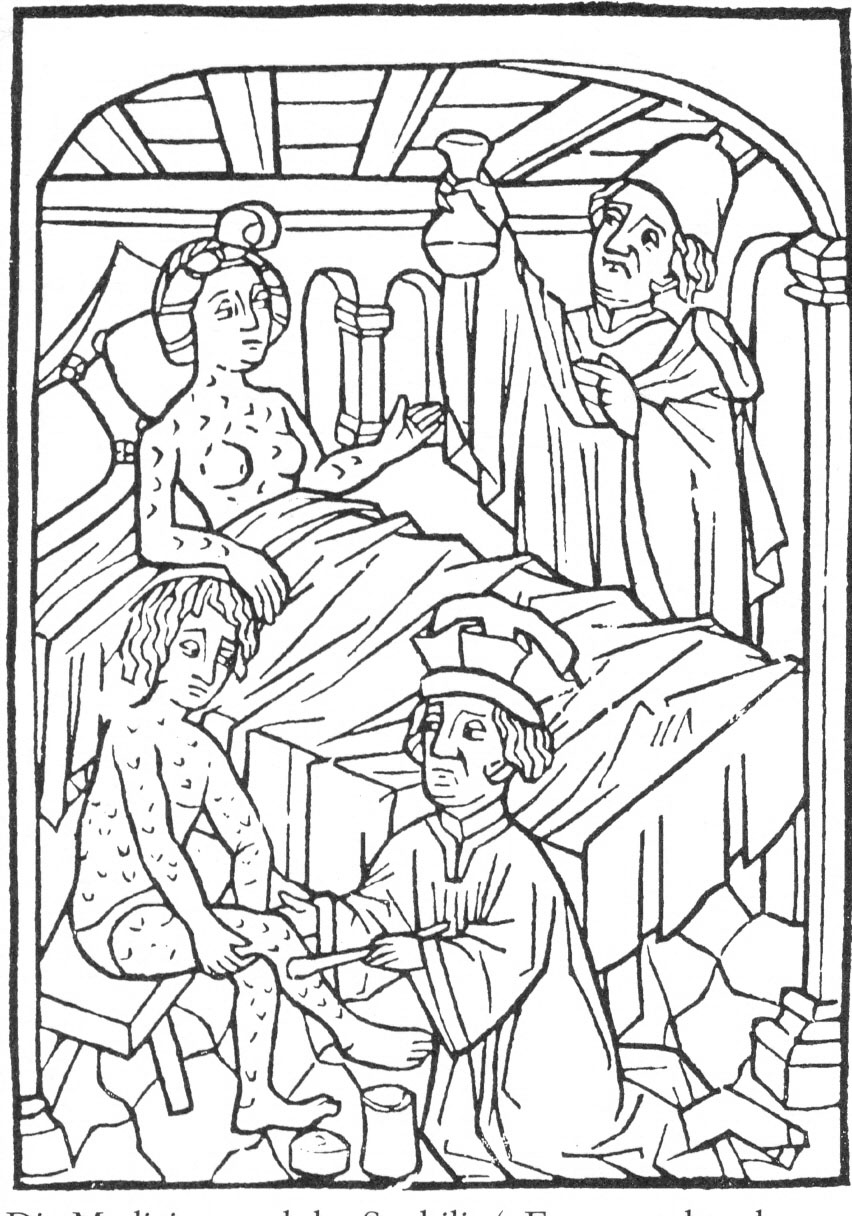
Illustration of people with syphilis, Vienna, 1498

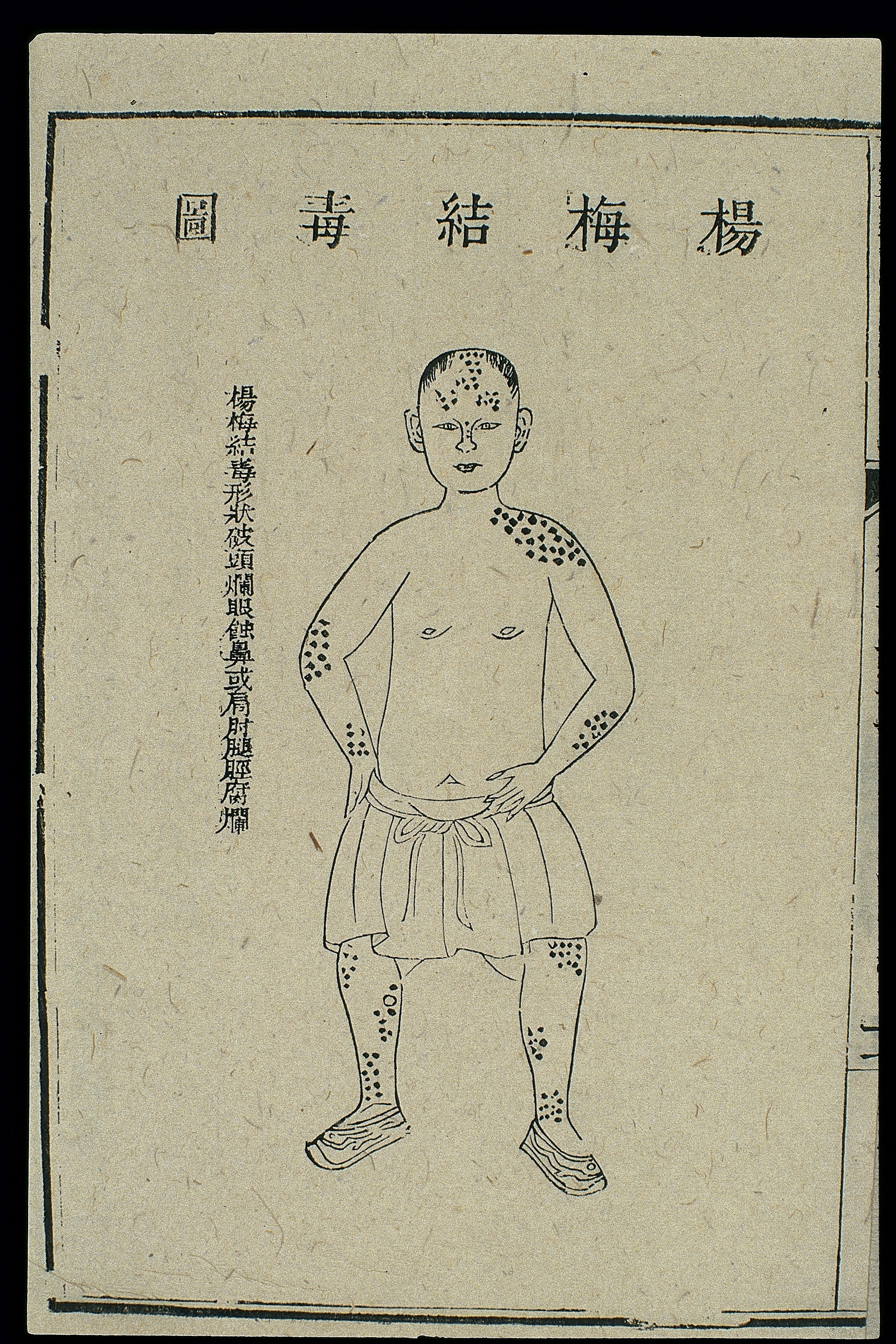
Syphilitic sores depicted in Yuzuan yizong jinjian (China, 1742)

The first recorded outbreak of syphilis in Europe occurred in 1494/1495 in Naples, Italy, during a French invasion. Because it was spread geographically by French troops returning from that campaign, the disease was known as "French disease", and it was not until 1530 that the term "syphilis" was first applied by the Italian physician and poet Girolamo Fracastoro. The causative organism, Treponema pallidum, was first identified by Fritz Schaudinn and Erich Hoffmann in 1905 at the Charité Clinic in Berlin. The first effective treatment, Salvarsan, was developed in 1910 by Sahachiro Hata in the laboratory of Paul Ehrlich. It was followed by the introduction of penicillin in 1943.

Many well-known figures, including Scott Joplin, Franz Schubert, Al Capone, and Édouard Manet are believed to have contracted the disease.

== Origin ==
The history of syphilis has been well studied, but the exact origin of the disease was the source of debate until archaeological and genetic evidence showed conclusively it originated in the Americas. There were two primary hypotheses: one, first proposed in the 1880s, was that syphilis was carried to Europe from the Americas by the crew(s) of Christopher Columbus as a byproduct of the Columbian exchange. The other hypothesis, first proposed in the 1930s, was that syphilis previously existed in Europe but went unrecognized. In 2020, there was a skeletal discovery in the Yucatán Peninsula dating over 9,900 years ago of a 30-year-old woman who had Treponema periostitis, an inflammation of the periosteum (the membrane surrounding the bones) that can be caused by the bacteria that causes syphilis. Phylogenetic analyses in 2008 and 2024 showed syphilis originated in the Americas around 9,000 years ago, adding to a preponderance of archaeological evidence showing the disease existed in the Americas prior to the arrival of Europeans, and the historical evidence documenting the arrival of syphilis in Europe coinciding directly with the arrival of the crew(s) of Columbus.

=== Historical debate over European origins ===
The deadliest of the four diseases that constitute treponematosis is syphilis, a sexually transmitted disease of adults. The others are bejel, yaws, and pinta, endemic childhood diseases that are usually not fatal, if still unpleasant and disfiguring. Throughout human history, confusion has reigned about the presence of syphilis in various populations around the world. It was often confused not only with the other treponematoses, but also with completely different diseases that produced similar symptoms. These included leprosy (Hansen's disease), elephantiasis, and scabies, among many others. For this reason syphilis came to be called "the great imitator", and in many places for long stretches of time it did not even have its own name. As a result of the difficulty of identifying syphilis in any given population, historians and paleopathologists have engaged in a long debate over its origins in Europe, where it famously ravaged the population in the late fifteenth and early sixteenth centuries. Two primary hypotheses emerged. One proposed that syphilis was carried to Europe from the Americas by the men who sailed with Christopher Columbus as a byproduct of the Columbian exchange. The other held that it previously existed in Europe but went unrecognized. These are referred to as the "Columbian" and "pre-Columbian" hypotheses.

There is no doubt that treponematosis existed in the Americas long before contact with Europe and Afro-Eurasia. For decades scholars of North and South American prehistory have agreed that the evidence from bones and teeth is clear. Genomic evidence places the time of origin for syphilis in the New World at about 9,000 years ago. The situation in the Old World had been murkier, with fewer specimens clearly pointing to treponematosis rather than some other disease. Added to this conundrum, there was no documentary record on syphilis, a particularly horrible disease that should have elicited commentary from priests, scholars, and/or kings in medieval Europe.

A lack of written evidence for the existence of syphilis in Europe, combined with an explosion of sources attesting to the appearance of a virulent new disease following exploration of the Caribbean islands, led some historians to accept the opinions of contemporary medical writers that Columbus and his men had brought the disease to Spain from America. From there it spread rapidly. In particular, the reliance of King Charles VIII of France on mercenary troops (some of them Spanish) at the time of his attack on Naples in the winter of 1495 had led, most historians believed, to the dissemination of the highly contagious "French pox" throughout Europe when those troops returned home to their own countries. This epidemic, perhaps the result of a more transmissible or deadlier variant of treponematosis, although that is not yet known, led to significant confusion beginning in the eighteenth century and exemplified most recently in the work of Kristin N. Harper and colleagues. Yet all this time some scholars believed that evidence from skeletal remains and documentary accounts did point to the existence of syphilis in Afro-Eurasia beginning in ancient times, even if it were rare. Foremost among them was Ellis Herndon Hudson, a clinician who published extensively about the prevalence of treponematosis, including syphilis, in times past.

=== Discoveries in paleopathology ===
In 2020, a group of leading paleopathologists concluded that enough evidence had been collected from bones and teeth to prove that treponemal disease existed in Europe prior to the voyages of Columbus. At least fifteen cases of acquired treponematosis based on evidence from bones, and six examples of congenital treponematosis based on evidence from teeth, are now widely accepted as ancient or medieval. In several of the twenty-one cases the evidence may also indicate syphilis specifically. Highlights of this important literature include:

- Two burials of adolescents from the Greek colony of Metaponto in southern Italy holding dental evidence of congenital syphilis, specifically incisors and molars deformed in particular ways. The children died c. 580–250 BC.
- In the Apple Down cemetery in West Sussex, UK archaeologists uncovered the skeleton of a young man with extensive damage to both his skull and long bones, a combination typical of syphilis. He died in the 6th century.
- In Anatolia in western Turkey the skeleton of a teenager revealed not only the same deformed incisors and molars as in Metaponto, but also damage to the entire post-cranial skeleton. Involvement of both teeth and bones in the same individual, and especially the large number of bones affected in this case, points to syphilis. The victim died in the 13th century.
- A young adult female buried in the cemetery of the Dominican Friary of Blackfriars in Gloucester, UK has been dated to the mid-15th century by traditional archaeological methods. This skeleton holds widespread evidence of treponematosis ranging from caries sicca and nasopalatine destruction on the skull to numerous lesions on the long bones, ribs, clavicles, scapulae, and sternum. This combination makes it a good candidate for a diagnosis of syphilis.

While the absolute number of cases is still small, they keep turning up, most recently in 2015 in London and St. Pölten, Austria. Yet there is an outstanding issue. Damaged teeth and bones seem to hold proof of pre-Columbian syphilis, but there is a possibility that they point to an endemic form of treponematosis instead. Some researchers have expressed skepticism regarding whether the cases from Metaponto, Apple Down and Turkey even represent treponemal diseases at all.

=== Discoveries in ancient DNA studies ===
As syphilis, bejel, and yaws vary considerably in mortality rates and the level of human disgust they elicit, it is important to know which one is under discussion in any given case, but it remains difficult for paleopathologists to distinguish among them. (Pinta is a skin disease and therefore unrecoverable through paleopathology.) Ancient DNA (aDNA) holds the answer, because just as only aDNA suffices to distinguish between syphilis and other diseases that produce similar symptoms in the body, it alone can differentiate spirochetes that are 99.8 percent identical with absolute accuracy. Progress on uncovering the historical extent of the various treponemal diseases through their aDNA remains slow, however, because the spirochete responsible for treponematosis, Treponema pallidum, is rare in skeletal remains and fragile, making it notoriously difficult to recover and analyze.

The genetic sequence of Treponema pallidum was deciphered by Claire M. Fraser and colleagues in 1998, and success in analyzing a 200-year-old example extracted from bones by Connie J. Kolman et al. came the next year. In 2012, Rafael Montiel and his co-authors were successful in amplifying two Treponema pallidum DNA sequences dated to the sixteenth and seventeenth centuries in southwestern Spain. In 2018 Verena J. Schuenemann and colleagues successfully recovered and reconstructed Treponema pallidum genomes from the skeletons of two infants and a neonate in Mexico City, from the late 17th to the mid-19th centuries. Two are believed to have had congenital syphilis and one congenital yaws. A breakthrough example (2020) from early modern Europe can be found in the work of Karen Giffin and her co-authors, who sequenced a genome of Treponema pallidum subspecies pertenue, the causal agent of yaws, from a Lithuanian tooth radiocarbon-dated to 1447–1616 (95 percent probability). The ability to sequence the entire genome is especially important for distinguishing among syndromes of treponematosis because of their close similarity. In this case, whole genome sequencing has resulted in two startling discoveries: that the subtropical syndrome yaws existed in northern Europe at the turn of the sixteenth century, and that yaws in its modern form is a relatively young disease that emerged only in the 12th to 14th centuries. Finally, in October 2020 Kerttu Majander and colleagues published research revealing that as early as the fifteenth to eighteenth centuries Treponema pallidum existed as syphilis and yaws in Finland, syphilis in Estonia, and a previously unknown basal strain in the Netherlands. Although precise dating to the medieval period is not yet possible, the presence of several different kinds of treponematosis at the beginning of the early modern period argues against its recent introduction from elsewhere. Therefore, they argue, treponematosis— possibly including syphilis—almost certainly existed in medieval Europe.

A 2024 study published in Nature analysed pre- and peri-contact ancient treponemal genomes from the Americas that represent ancient relatives of the T. pallidum pallidum (syphilis), T. pallidum pertenue (yaws) and T. pallidum endemicum (bejel) lineages. The study concluded: "Our data indicate unexplored diversity and an emergence of T. pallidum that post-dates human occupation in the Americas. Together these results support an American origin for all T. pallidum characterized at the genomic level, both modern and ancient".

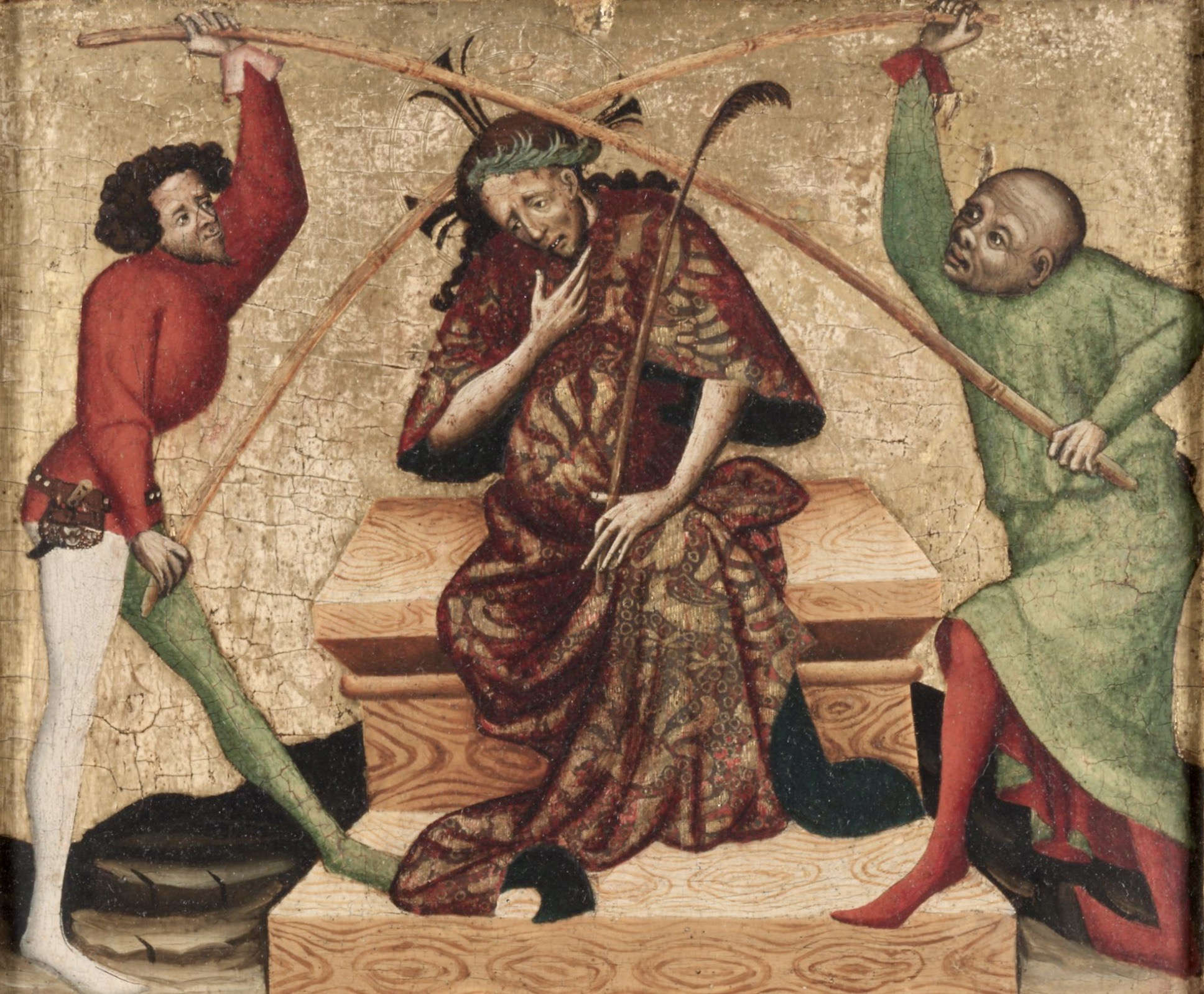
A healthy man and a diseased man torture Christ before his crucifixion. Books of Hours, c. 1375–1435 (detail). France. (Getty Museum Open Content Program).

=== Evidence from art ===
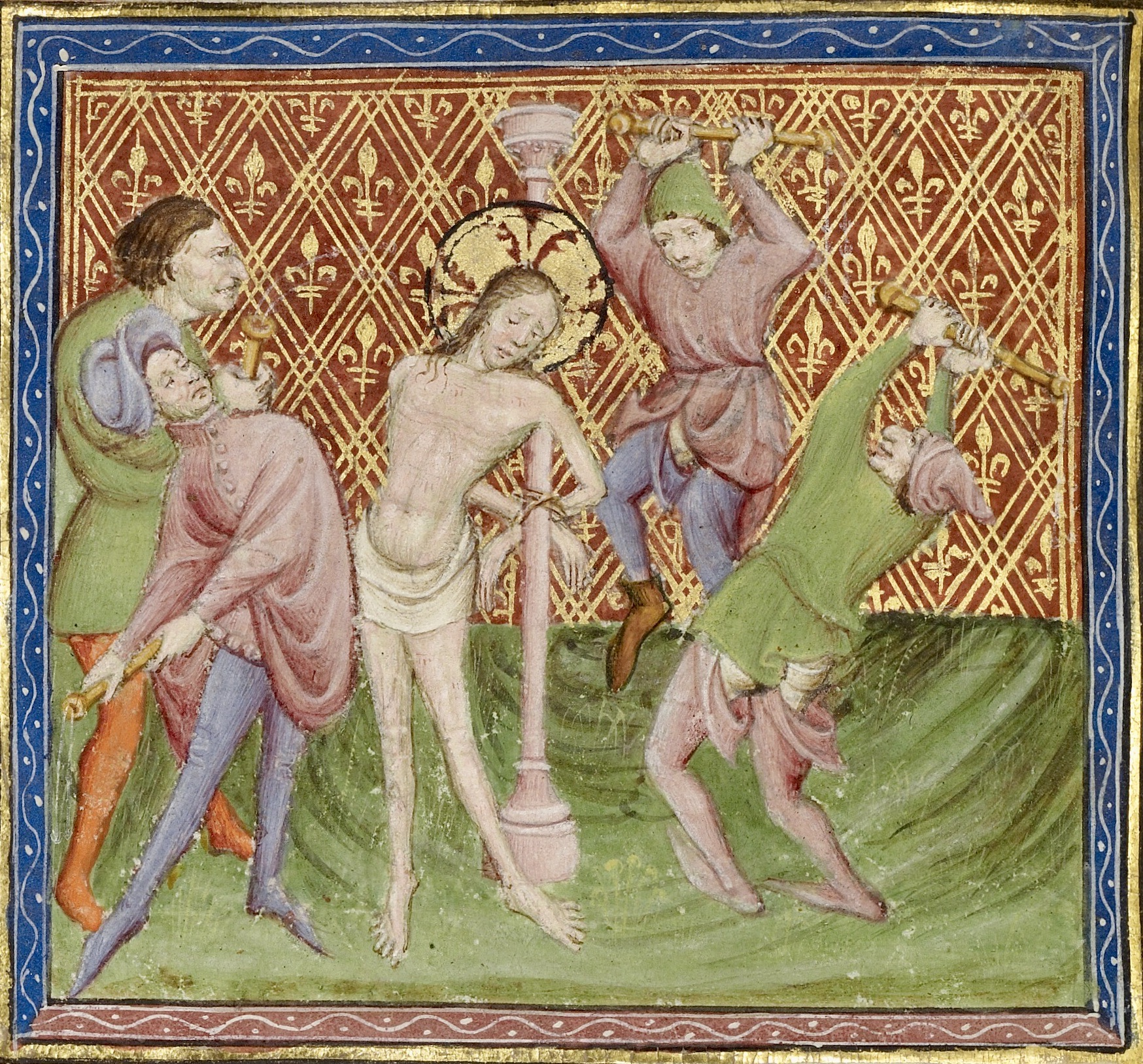
A man with a diseased penis torments Christ. Diptych with the Passion of Christ c. 1400 (detail). Austria, Styria. (Cleveland Museum of Art Open Access Program)

Despite significant progress in tracing the presence of syphilis in past historic periods, definitive findings from paleopathology and aDNA studies are still lacking for the period before Columbus. This makes newly available evidence from art helpful for settling the issue. Research by Marylynn Salmon has provided examples of deformities in medieval subjects that can be usefully compared to those of modern victims of the disease in medical drawings and photographs.

One of the most typical deformities of treponematosis is a collapsed nasal bridge called saddle nose, usually accompanied by baldness. Salmon demonstrates that it appears often in medieval illuminations, especially among the men tormenting Christ in scenes of the crucifixion. The association of saddle nose with men perceived to be so evil they would kill the son of God indicates the artists were thinking of syphilis, which is typically transmitted through sexual intercourse with promiscuous partners. Such behavior was considered a mortal sin by Christians in medieval times. One illuminator goes so far as to show a flagellant with an exposed penis, red at the tip as though infected with a syphilitic sore. Others show the deformed teeth associated with congenital syphilis—Hutchinson's incisors—or the eye deformity ptosis that often appears in victims of the disease.

=== A historical mystery ===
For researchers attempting to promote a pre-Columbian theory for the emergence of the disease in Europe, it remains mysterious why the authors of medieval medical treatises so uniformly refrained from describing syphilis or commenting on its existence in the population. It is probable that many confused it with other diseases. The great variety of symptoms of treponematosis, the different ages at which the various diseases appears, and its widely divergent outcomes depending on climate and culture, would have added greatly to the confusion of medical practitioners, as what happened until the middle of the 20th century.

Another factor also seems to have been important, obfuscation in the medical literature. In an age that associated illness with sin, the implications of revealing a disease more often fatal to elites than commoners could be incendiary. Significantly, bejel and yaws were endemic in rural, underdeveloped communities such as those of peasants in medieval Europe. Children became ill by sharing drinking vessels and bedding holding only small bacterial loads, and as a result their cases were not usually serious. Syphilis, in contrast, generally was transmitted by venereal sores holding a massive inoculation of Treponema pallidum. Previously uninfected adults, often elites who had been protected by their more hygienic lifestyles, therefore became much sicker upon infection, and died more often. The importance of bacterial load was first noted by the physician Ernest Grin in 1952 in his study of syphilis in Bosnia.

Such a difference would have been politically dangerous to elites, especially if it became known that they were responsible for spreading syphilis. Historian Jon Arrizabalaga has investigated this question for Castile with startling results revealing an effort to hide its association with the nobility. Still, there are hints of the truth in the historical record. The Spanish physician Gaspare Torrella (1452–1520), who treated several members of the papal court, including Cesare Borgia, wrote that in southern Spain the disease he called "pudendagra" was already known as morbus curialis because of its association with the court. Similarly, in Eastern Europe it was called "the malady of palaces". In France, the association of syphilis with court life was responsible for the term mal de cour, which usage lasted into modern times. The Rouen physician Jacques de Béthencourt (1477–ca. 1527) similarly observed that syphilis was known there as "the disease of the magnates". The fact that following the epidemic of 1495 countries blamed its rapid transmission on each other (in Naples it was called the French Pox and in France the Neapolitan disease) indicates that syphilis was immediately perceived negatively. Conveniently for the European nobility, documentation is abundant that in Europe people believed syphilis had originated not at court, but in the New World.

=== Combination theory ===
Historian Alfred Crosby suggested in 2003 that both theories are partly correct in a "combination theory". Crosby says that the bacterium that causes syphilis belongs to the same phylogenetic family as the bacteria that cause yaws and several other diseases. Despite the tradition of assigning the homeland of yaws to sub-Saharan Africa, Crosby notes that there is no unequivocal evidence of any related disease having been present in pre-Columbian Europe, Africa, or Asia. Crosby writes, "It is not impossible that the organisms causing treponematosis arrived from America in the 1490s ... and evolved into both venereal and non-venereal syphilis and yaws." However, Crosby considers it more likely that a highly contagious ancestral species of the bacteria moved with early human ancestors across the land bridge of the Bering Straits many thousands of years ago without dying out in the original source population. He hypothesizes that "the differing ecological conditions produced different types of treponematosis and, in time, closely related but different diseases."

A more recent, modified version of the Columbian theory that better fits skeletal evidence from the New World, and also "absolved the New World of being the birthplace of syphilis", proposes that a nonvenereal form of treponemal disease, without the lesions common to congenital syphilis, was brought back to Europe by Columbus and his crew. Upon arrival in the Old World, the bacterium, which was similar to modern day yaws, responded to new selective pressures with the eventual birth of the subspecies of sexually transmitted syphilis. This theory is supported by genetic studies of venereal syphilis and related bacteria, which found a disease intermediate between yaws and syphilis in Guyana, South America. However, the study has been criticized in part because some of its conclusions were based on a tiny number of sequence differences between the Guyana strains and other treponemes whose sequences were examined.

== European outbreak ==
The first well-recorded European outbreak of what is now known as syphilis occurred in 1495 among French troops invading Italy. It may have been transmitted to the French via Spanish mercenaries serving Charles VIII of France in that campaign. From this centre, the disease swept across Europe. As Jared Diamond describes it, "[W]hen syphilis was first definitely recorded in Europe in 1495, its pustules often covered the body from the head to the knees, caused flesh to fall from people's faces, and led to death within a few months." The disease then was much more lethal than it is today. The epidemiology of this first syphilis epidemic shows that the disease was either new or a mutated form of an earlier disease.

Some researchers argued that syphilis was carried from the New World to Europe after Columbus' voyages, while others argue the disease has a much longer history in Europe. Many of the crew members who served on this voyage later joined the army of King Charles VIII in his invasion of Italy in 1495, which some argue may have resulted in the spreading of the disease across Europe and as many as five million deaths. Some findings suggest Europeans could have carried the nonvenereal tropical bacteria home, where the organisms may have mutated into a more deadly form in the different conditions and low immunity of the population of Europe. Syphilis was a major killer in Europe during the Renaissance. In his Serpentine Malady (Seville, 1539) Ruy Díaz de Isla estimated that over a million people were infected in Europe. He also postulated that the disease was previously unknown, and came from the island of Hispaniola (modern Dominican Republic and Haiti).

According to a 2020 study, more than 20% of individuals in the range of 15–34 years old in late 18th century London were treated for syphilis.

== Historical terms ==
The name "syphilis" was coined by the Italian physician and poet Girolamo Fracastoro in his pastoral noted poem, written in Latin, titled Syphilis sive morbus gallicus (Latin for "Syphilis or The French Disease") in 1530. The protagonist of the poem is a shepherd named Syphilus (perhaps a variant spelling of Sipylus, a character in Ovid's Metamorphoses). Syphilus is presented as the first man to contract the disease, sent by the god Apollo as punishment for the defiance that Syphilus and his followers had shown him. From this character Fracastoro derived a new name for the disease, which he also used in his medical text De Contagione et Contagiosis Morbis (1546) ("On Contagion and Contagious Diseases").

Until that time, as Fracastoro notes, syphilis had been called the "French disease" (Italian: mal francese) in Italy, Malta, Poland and Germany, and the "Italian disease" in France. In addition, the Dutch called it the "Spanish disease", the Russians called it the "Polish disease", and the Turks called it the "Christian disease" or "Frank (Western European) disease" (frengi). These "national" names were generally reflective of contemporary political spite between nations and frequently served as a sort of propaganda; the Protestant Dutch, for example, fought and eventually won a war of independence against their Spanish Habsburg rulers who were Catholic, so referring to Syphilis as the "Spanish" disease reinforced a politically useful perception that the Spanish were immoral or unworthy. However, the attributions are also suggestive of possible routes of the spread of the infection, at least as perceived by "recipient" populations. The inherent xenophobia of the terms also stemmed from the disease's particular epidemiology, often being spread by foreign sailors and soldiers during their frequent sexual contact with local prostitutes.

During the 16th century, it was called "great pox" in order to distinguish it from smallpox. In its early stages, the great pox produced a rash similar to smallpox (also known as variola). However, the name is misleading, as smallpox was a far more deadly disease. The terms "lues" (or Lues venerea, Latin for "venereal plague") and "Cupid's disease" have also been used to refer to syphilis. In Scotland, syphilis was referred to as the Grandgore or Spanyie Pockis. The ulcers suffered by British soldiers in Portugal were termed "The Black Lion".

== Historical treatments ==
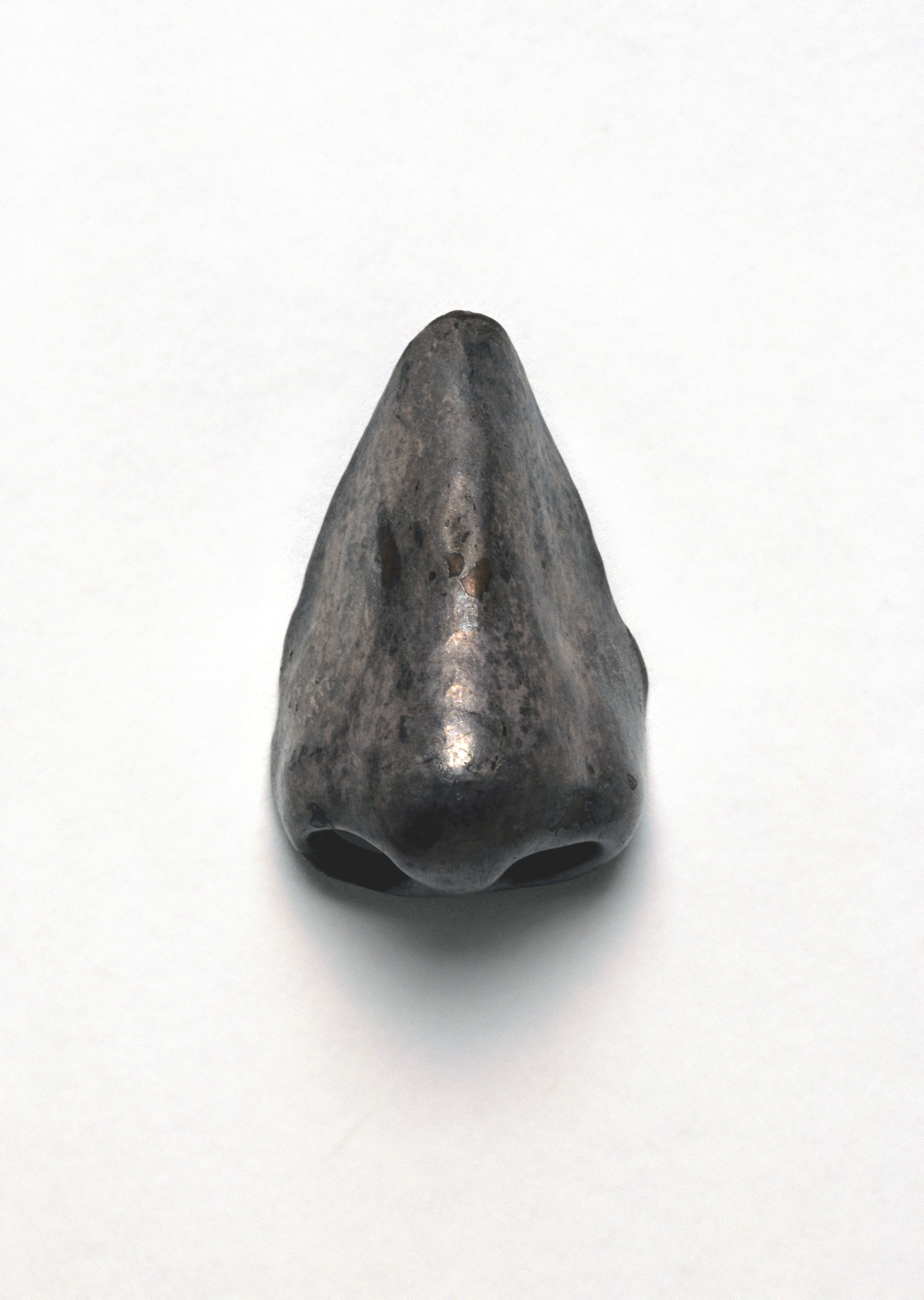
An artificial nose from the 17th–18th century. Such cosmetic replacements were sometimes used due to effects of the disease.

There were originally no effective treatments for syphilis (in Europe) although a number of remedies were tried. In the infant stages of this disease in Europe, many ineffective and dangerous treatments were used. The aim of treatment was to expel the foreign, disease-causing substance from the body, so methods included blood-letting, laxative use, and baths in wine and herbs or olive oil.

Mercury was a common, long-standing treatment for syphilis. The Canon of Medicine (1025) by the Persian physician Ibn Sina suggested treating early stages of leprosy with mercury; during an early European outbreak of the disease, Francisco Lopez de Villalobos compared this to syphilis, though he noted major differences between the diseases. Paracelsus likewise noted mercury's positive effects in the Arabic treatment of leprosy, which was thought to be related to syphilis, and used the substance for treating the disease. Giorgio Sommariva of Verona is recorded to have used mercury to treat syphilis in 1496, and is often recognized as the first physician to have done so, although he may not have been a physician. During the sixteenth century, mercury was administered to syphilitic patients in various ways, including by rubbing it on the skin, by applying a plaster, and by mouth. A "Fumigation" method of administering mercury was also used, in which mercury was vaporized over a fire and the patients were exposed to the resulting steam, either by being placed in a bottomless seat over the hot coals, or by having their entire bodies except for the head enclosed in a box (called a "tabernacle") that received the steam. The goal of mercury treatment was to cause the patient to salivate, which was thought to expel the disease. Unpleasant side effects of mercury treatment included gum ulcers and loose teeth. Mercury continued to be used in syphilis treatment for centuries; an 1869 article by Thomas James Walker, M. D., discussed administering mercury by injection for this purpose.

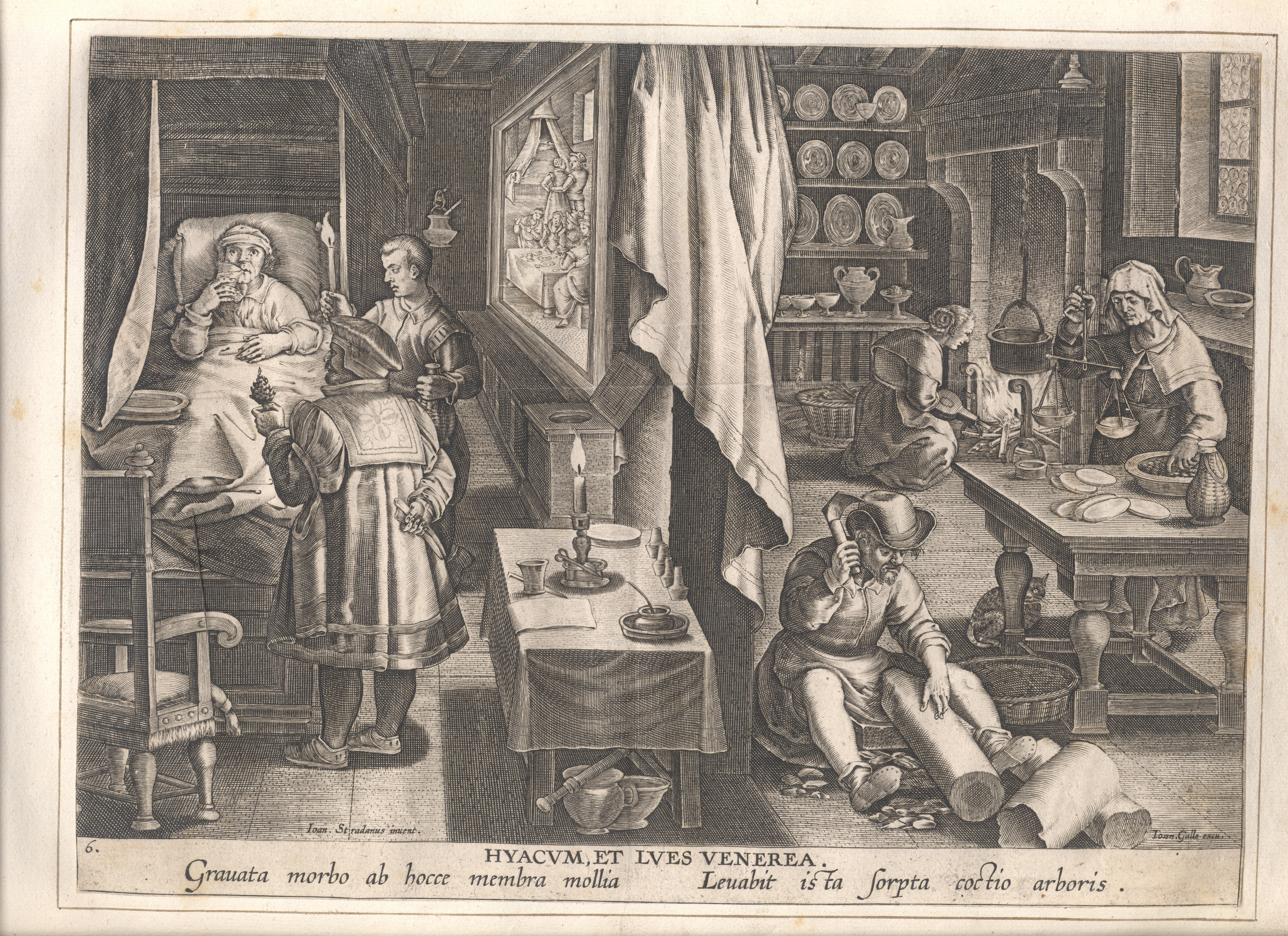
The discovery of guaiacum as cure for syphilis, after Stradanus, 1590

Guaiacum was a popular treatment in the 16th century and was strongly advocated by Ulrich von Hutten and others. Because guaiacum came from Hispaniola where Columbus had landed, proponents of the Columbian theory contended that God had provided a cure in the same location from which the disease originated. In 1525, the Spanish priest Francisco Delicado, who himself suffered from syphilis, wrote El modo de adoperare el legno de India occidentale (How to Use the Wood from the West Indies) discussing the use of guaiacum for treatment of syphilis. Although it did not have the unpleasant side effects of mercury, guaiacum was not particularly effective, at least not beyond the short term, and mercury was thought to be more effective. Some physicians continued to use both mercury and guaiacum on patients. After 1522, the Blatterhaus—an Augsburg municipal hospital for the syphilitic poor—would administer guaiacum (as a hot drink, followed by a sweating cure) as the first treatment, and use mercury as the treatment of last resort.

Another 16th-century treatment advocated by the Italian physician Antonio Musa Brassavola was the oral administration of Root of China, a form of sarsaparilla (Smilax). In 1643, it was noted by Roger Williams in the early Americas that the Indigenous Narragansett and the Wampanoag peoples of Rhode Island had regular sweat lodges and “by sweating and some potions, they perfectly and speedily cure” syphilis, though at the time Europeans did not view Indigenous remedies as suitable for Europeans. In the seventeenth century, English physician and herbalist Nicholas Culpeper recommended the use of heartsease (wild pansy).

Before effective treatments were available, syphilis could sometimes be disfiguring in the long term, leading to defects of the face and nose ("nasal collapse"). Syphilis was a stigmatized disease due to its sexually transmissible nature. Such defects marked the person as a social pariah, and a symbol of sexual deviancy. Artificial noses were sometimes used to improve this appearance. The pioneering work of the facial surgeon Gasparo Tagliacozzi in the 16th century marked one of the earliest attempts to surgically reconstruct nose defects. Before the invention of the free flap, only local tissue adjacent to the defect could be harvested for use, as the blood supply was a vital determining factor in the survival of the flap. Tagliacozzi's technique was to harvest tissue from the arm without removing its pedicle from the blood supply on the arm. The patient would have to stay with their arm strapped to their face until new blood vessels grew at the recipient site, and the flap could finally be separated from the arm during a second procedure.

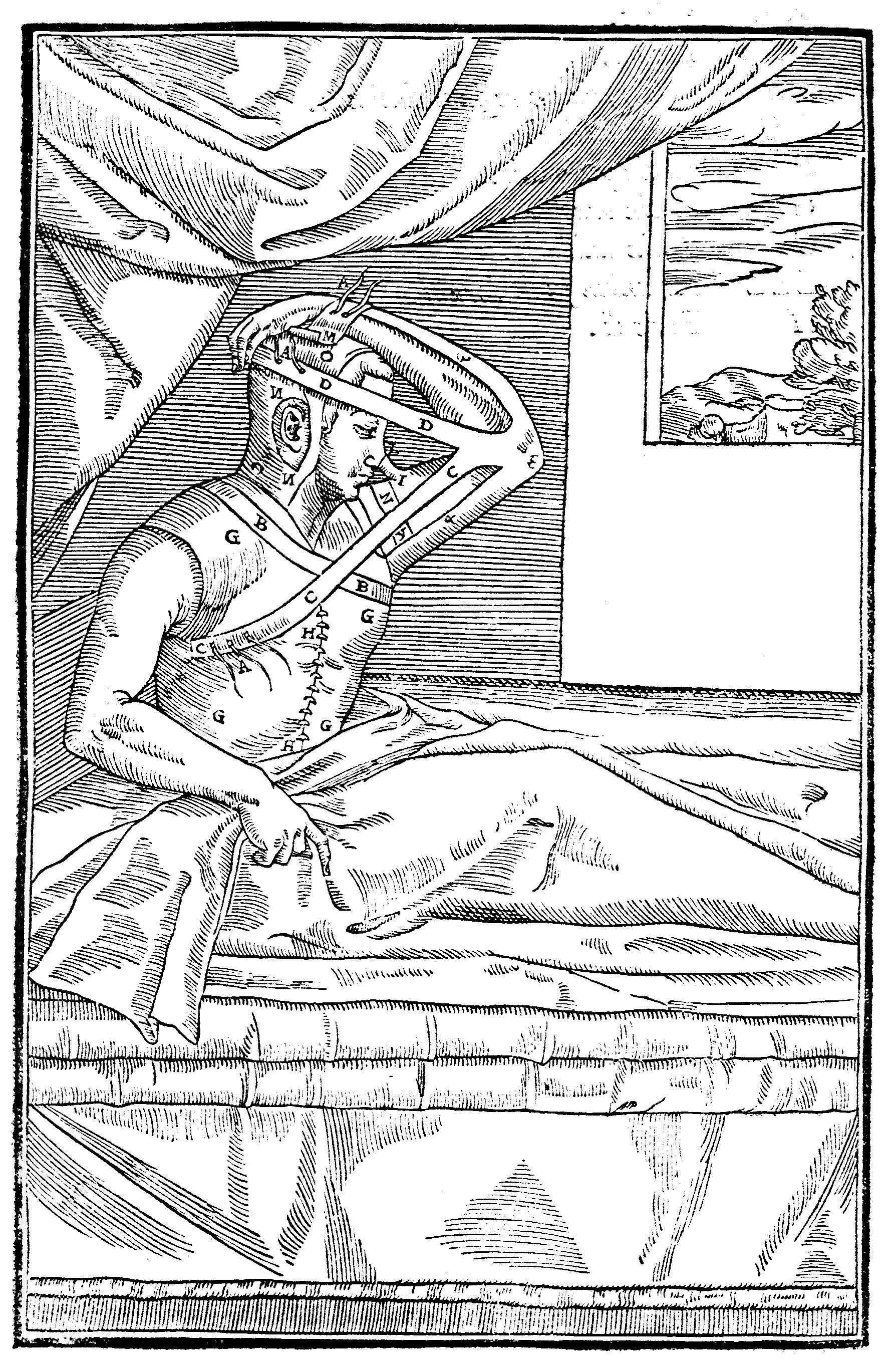
An early technique for grafting tissue to surgically correct a nose defect.

As the disease became better understood, more effective treatments were found. An antimicrobial used for treating disease was the organo-arsenical drug Salvarsan, whose anti-syphility properties were discovered in 1908 by Sahachiro Hata in the laboratory of Nobel Prize winner Paul Ehrlich. The same group of researchers later discovered the related organo-arsenical, Neosalvarsan. The side-effect profile of Neosalvarsan is gentler and its storage and preparation were more convenient than those of Salvarsan, which must be stored under nitrogen.

It was observed that sometimes patients who developed high fevers were cured of syphilis. Thus, for a brief time malaria was used as treatment for tertiary syphilis because it produced prolonged and high fevers (a form of pyrotherapy). This was considered an acceptable risk because the malaria could later be treated with quinine, which was available at that time. Malaria as a treatment for syphilis was usually reserved for late disease, especially neurosyphilis, and then followed by either Salvarsan or Neosalvarsan as adjuvant therapy. This discovery was championed by Julius Wagner-Jauregg, who won the 1927 Nobel Prize for Medicine for his discovery of the therapeutic value of malaria inoculation in the treatment of neurosyphilis. Later, hyperthermal cabinets (sweat-boxes) were used for the same purpose. These treatments were finally rendered obsolete by the discovery of penicillin, and its widespread manufacture after World War II allowed syphilis to be effectively and reliably cured.

== History of diagnosis ==
In 1905, Fritz Schaudinn and Erich Hoffmann discovered Treponema pallidum in tissue of patients with syphilis. One year later, the first effective test for syphilis, the Wassermann test, was developed. Although it had some false positive results, it was a major advance in the detection and prevention of syphilis. By allowing testing before the acute symptoms of the disease had developed, this test allowed the prevention of transmission of syphilis to others, even though it did not provide a cure for those infected. In the 1930s the Hinton test, developed by William Augustus Hinton, and based on flocculation, was shown to have fewer false positive reactions than the Wassermann test. Both of these early tests have been superseded by newer analytical methods.

While working at the Rockefeller University (then called the Rockefeller Institute for Medical Research) in 1913, Hideyo Noguchi, a Japanese scientist, demonstrated the presence of the spirochete Treponema pallidum in the brain of a progressive paralysis patient, associating Treponema pallidum with neurosyphilis. Prior to Noguchi's discovery, syphilis had been a burden to humanity in many lands. Without its cause being understood, it was sometimes misdiagnosed and often misattributed to damage by political enemies. It is called "the great pretender" for its variety of symptoms. Felix Milgrom developed a test for syphilis. The Hideyo Noguchi Africa Prize was named to honor the man who identified the agent in association with the late form of the infectious disease.

== Prevalence ==
An excavation of a seventeenth-century cemetery at St Thomas's Hospital in London, England found that 13 per cent of skeletons showed evidence of treponemal lesions. These lesions are only present in a small minority of syphilitic cases, implying that the hospital was treating large numbers of syphilitics. In 1770s London, approximately 1 in 5 people over the age of 35 were infected with syphilis. In 1770s Chester, the figure was about 8.06 per cent. By 1911, the figure for London was 11.4 per cent, about half that of the 1770s.

A 2014 study estimated the prevalence of syphilis in the United Kingdom in 1911–1912 as 7.771%. The location with the highest prevalence was London, at 11.373%, and the social class with the highest prevalence was unskilled working-class, at 11.781%.

The control of syphilis in the United Kingdom began with the 1916 report of a Royal Commission on Venereal Diseases. Clinics were established offering testing and education. This caused a fall in the prevalence of syphilis, leading to almost a halving of tabes dorsalis between 1914 and 1936. With the mass production of penicillin from 1943, syphilis could be cured. Syphilis screening was introduced for every pregnancy. Contact tracing was also introduced. By 1956, congenital syphilis had been almost eliminated, and female cases of acquired syphilis had been reduced to a hundredth of their level just 10 years previously.

In 1978 in England and Wales, homosexual men accounted for 58% of syphilis cases in (and 76% of cases in London), but by 1994–1996 this figure was 25%, possibly driven by safe-sex practices to avoid HIV. In 1995, only 130 total cases were reported. A substantial proportion of infections are linked to foreign travel. Antenatal testing continues.

In the United States in 1917, 6% of World War I servicemen were found to have syphilis. In 1936, a public health campaign began to prescribe arsphenamine to treat syphilis. Between 1945 and 1955 penicillin was used to treat over two million Americans for syphilis, and contact tracing was introduced. Syphilis prevalence dropped to an all-time low by 1955. A total of 6993 cases of primary and secondary syphilis were recorded in 1998, the lowest number since 1941. In 2000 and 2001 in the United States, the national rate of reported primary and secondary syphilis cases was 2.1 cases per 100,000 population (6103 cases reported). This was the lowest rate since 1941. As of 2014, the incidence increased to 6.3 cases per 100,000 population (19,999 cases reported). The majority of these new cases were in men who have sex with men. Syphilis in newborns in the United States increased from 8.4 cases per 100,000 live births (334 cases) between 2008 and 2012 to 11.6 cases per 100,000 live births (448 cases) between 2012 and 2014.

== Arts and literature ==
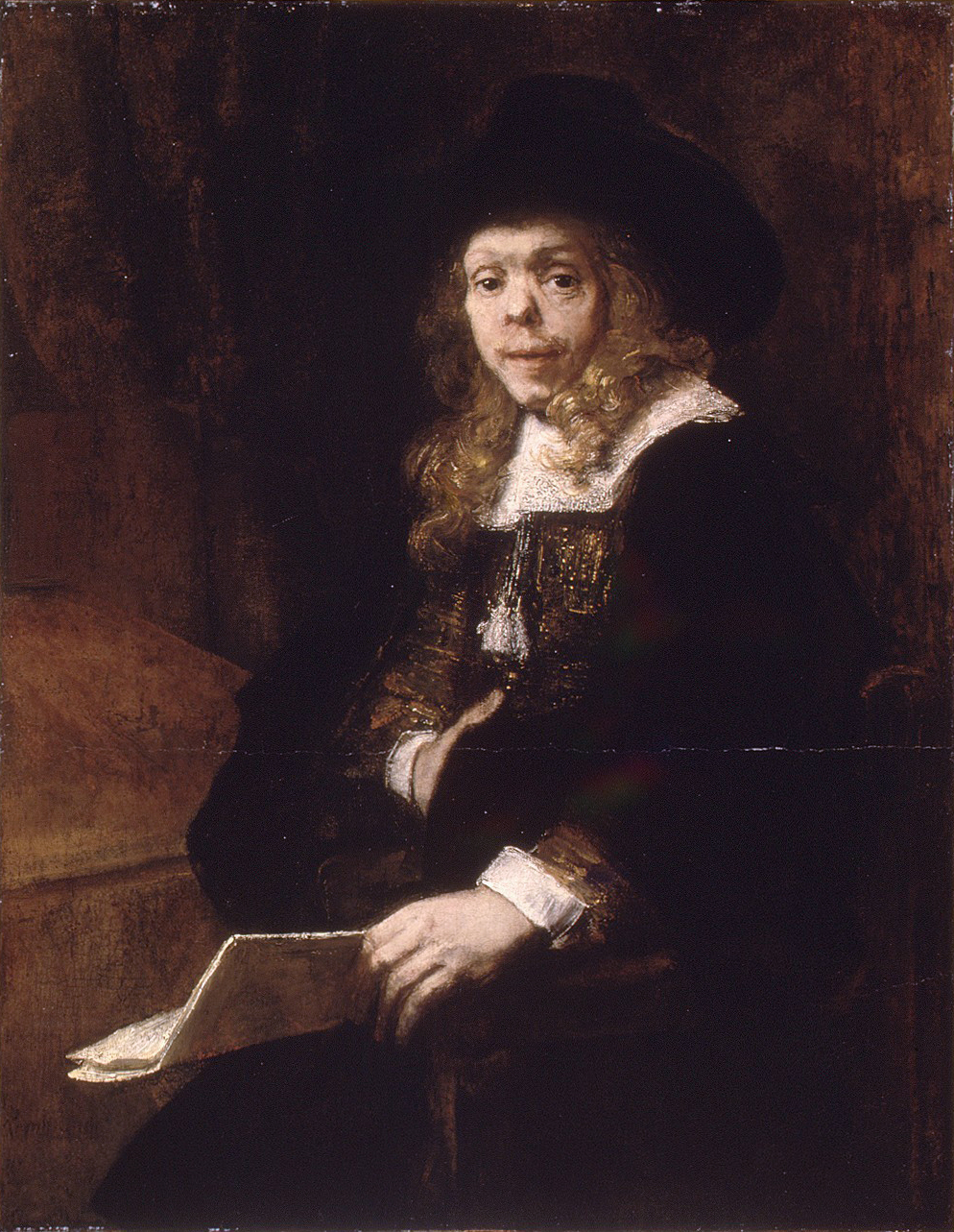
Portrait of Gerard de Lairesse by Rembrandt van Rijn, ca. 1665–67, oil on canvas. De Lairesse, himself a painter and art theorist, suffered from congenital syphilis that severely deformed his face and eventually blinded him.

The earliest known depiction of an individual with syphilis is Albrecht Dürer's Syphilitic Man (1496), a woodcut believed to represent a Landsknecht, a Northern European mercenary. The myth of the femme fatale or "poison women" of the 19th century is believed to be partly derived from the devastation of syphilis, with classic examples in literature including John Keats' La Belle Dame sans Merci. Poet Sebastian Brant in 1496 wrote a poem titled De pestilentiali Scorra sive mala de Franzos which explains the spread of the disease across the European continent. Brant also created artistic creations showing religious and political views of syphilis, especially with a work showing Saint Mary and Jesus throwing lightning to punish or cure those afflicted by syphilis, and he also added Holy Roman Emperor Maximilian I in the work, being rewarded by Mary and Jesus for his work against the immoral disease, to show the strong relationship between church and state during the 16th and 17th centuries.

The Flemish artist Stradanus designed a print of a wealthy man receiving treatment for syphilis with the tropical wood guaiacum sometime around 1580. The title of the work is "Preparation and Use of Guayaco for Treating Syphilis". That the artist chose to include this image in a series of works celebrating the New World indicates how important a treatment, however ineffective, for syphilis was to the European elite at that time. The richly colored and detailed work depicts four servants preparing the concoction while a physician looks on, hiding something behind his back while the hapless patient drinks. Another artistic depiction of syphilis treatment is credited to Jacques Laniet in the seventeenth century as he illustrated a man using the fumigation stove, another popular method of syphilis treatment, with a nearby barrel etched with the saying "For a pleasure, a thousand pains." Remedies to cure syphilis were frequently illustrated to deter those from acts which could lead to the contraction of syphilis because the treatment methods were normally painful and ineffective.

== Tuskegee and Guatemala studies ==
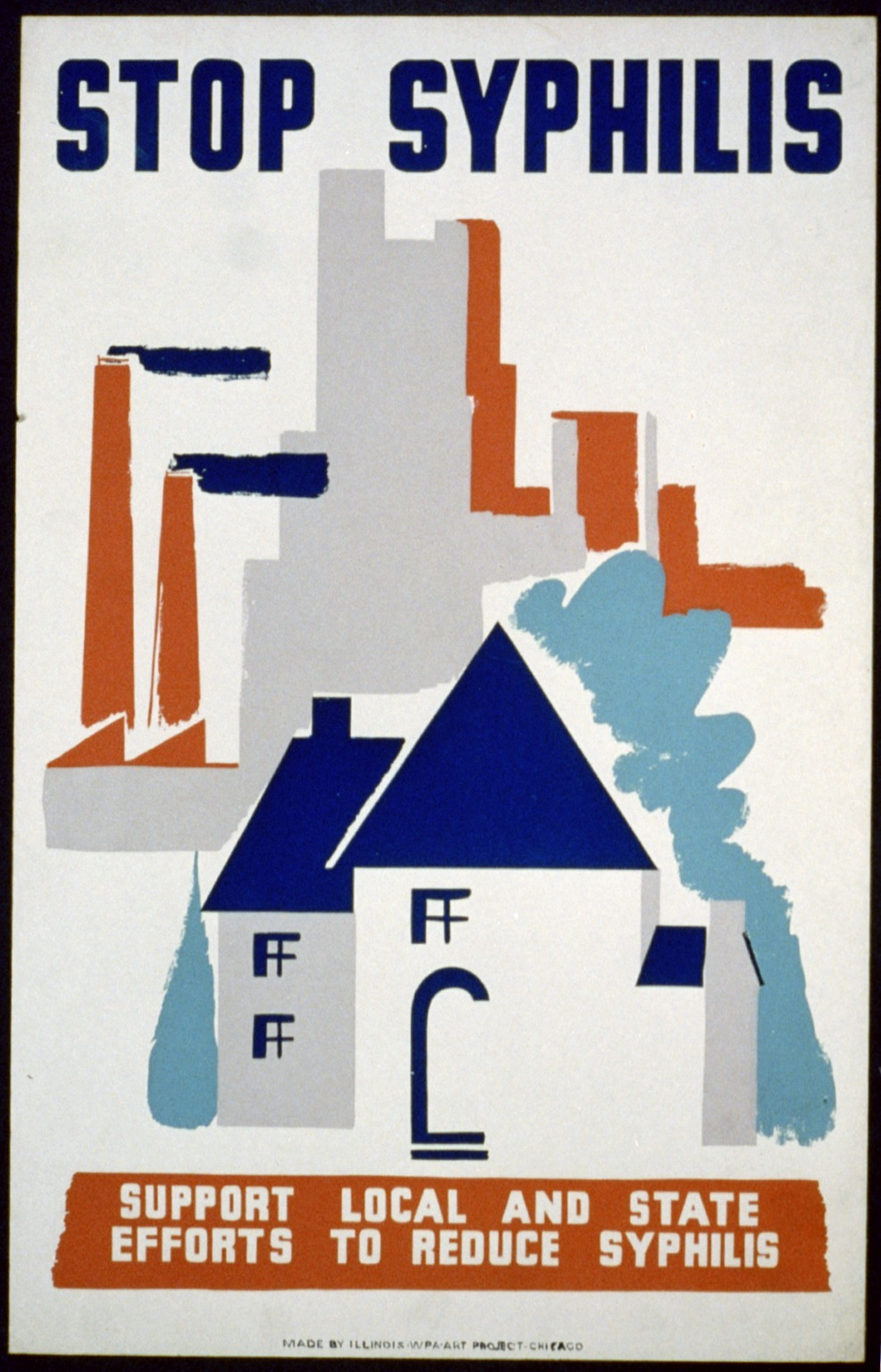
A Work Projects Administration poster about syphilis ca. 1940.

One of the most infamous United States cases of questionable medical ethics in the 20th century was the Tuskegee syphilis study. The study took place in Tuskegee, Alabama, and was supported by the U.S. Public Health Service (PHS) in partnership with the Tuskegee Institute. The study began in 1932, when syphilis was a widespread problem and there was no safe and effective treatment. The study was designed to measure the progression of untreated syphilis. By 1947, penicillin had been shown to be an effective cure for early syphilis and was becoming widely used to treat the disease. Its use in later syphilis, however, was still unclear. Study directors continued the study and did not offer the participants treatment with penicillin. This is debated, and some have found that penicillin was given to many of the subjects.

In the 1960s, Peter Buxtun sent a letter to the CDC, who controlled the study, expressing concern about the ethics of letting hundreds of black men die of a disease that could be cured. The CDC asserted that it needed to continue the study until all of the men had died. In 1972, Buxtun went to the mainstream press, causing a public outcry. As a result, the program was terminated, a lawsuit brought those affected nine million dollars, and Congress created a commission empowered to write regulations to deter such abuses from occurring in the future.

On 16 May 1997, thanks to the efforts of the Tuskegee Syphilis Study Legacy Committee formed in 1994, survivors of the study were invited to the White House to be present when President Bill Clinton apologized on behalf of the United States government for the study.

Syphilis experiments were also carried out in Guatemala from 1946 to 1948. They were United States-sponsored human experiments, conducted during the government of Juan José Arévalo with the cooperation of some Guatemalan health ministries and officials. Doctors infected soldiers, prisoners, and mental patients with syphilis and other sexually transmitted diseases, without the informed consent of the subjects, and then treated them with antibiotics. In October 2010, the U.S. formally apologized to Guatemala for conducting these experiments.

== Elimination ==
In 2015, Cuba became the first country in the world to receive validation from WHO for eliminating mother to child transmission of syphilis.

== See also ==
- HIV
- Gonorrhea
- V. D. Radio Project

== Bibliography ==
- Dutour, Olivier (1994). L'Origine de la syphilis en Europe: avant ou après 1493?. Paris: Errance. ISBN 2-87772-097-7. OCLC 611585998.
