= General paresis of the insane =

Organic mental disorder caused by late-stage syphilis

General paresis
- Other names: General paralysis of the insane, paralytic dementia
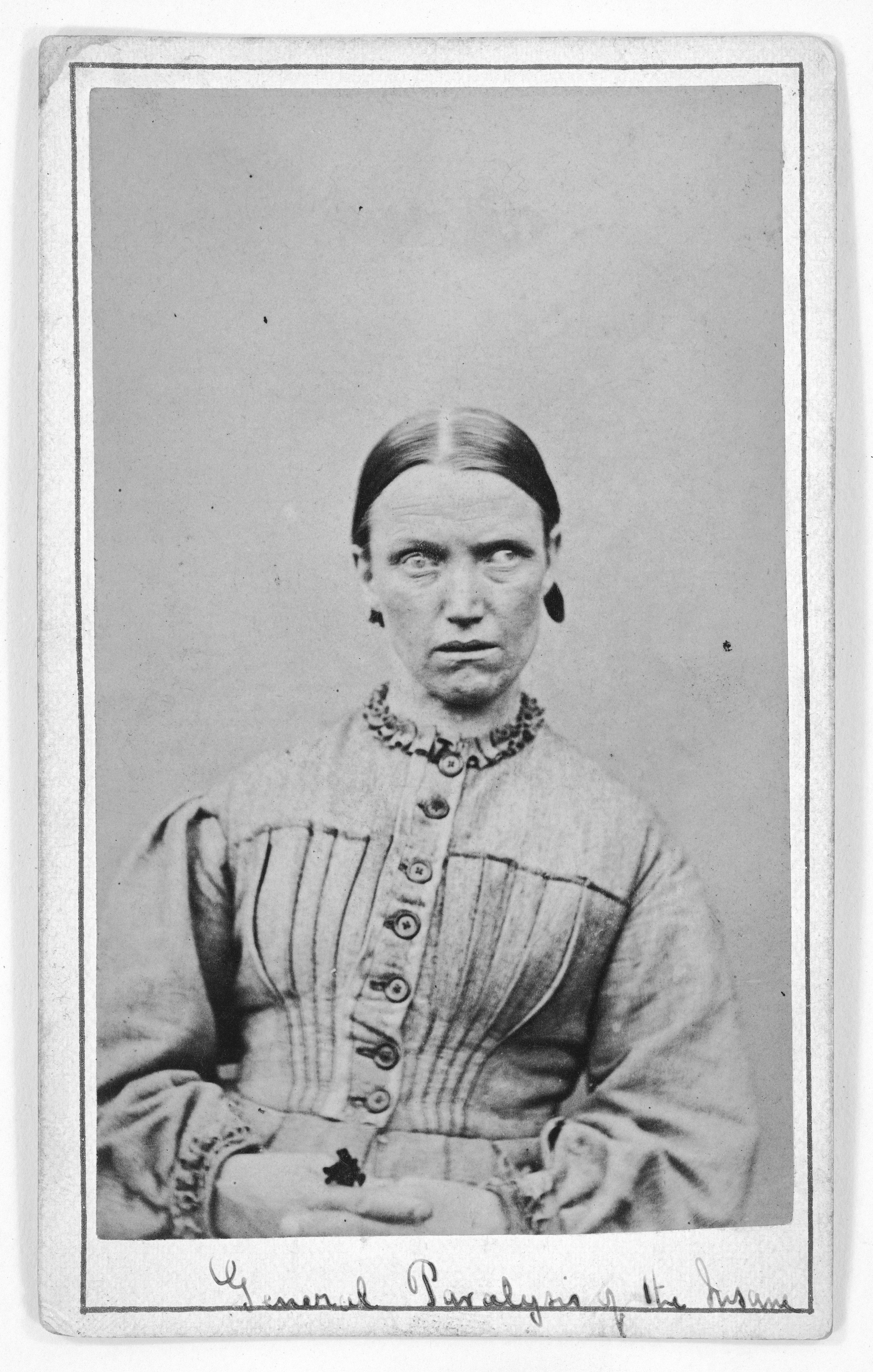
- Woman suffering from general paralysis; c. 1869.
- Symptoms: Early: Neurasthenia, personality changes, mood swings, problems with memory, judgment and concentration Later: Delusions, dementia, tremors, hyperreflexia, seizures, cachexia
- Usual onset: 10-30 years after initial infection
- Causes: Meningoencephalitis caused by syphilis
- Risk factors: Untreated syphilis infection

General paresis, also known as general paralysis of the insane (GPI), paralytic dementia, or syphilitic paresis is a severe neuropsychiatric disorder, classified as an organic mental disorder, and is caused by late-stage syphilis and the chronic meningoencephalitis and cerebral atrophy that are associated with this late stage of the disease when left untreated. GPI differs from mere paresis, as mere paresis can result from multiple other causes and usually does not affect cognitive function. Degenerative changes caused by GPI are associated primarily with the frontal and temporal lobar cortex. The disease affects approximately 7% of individuals infected with syphilis, and is far more common in developing countries where fewer options for timely treatment are available. It is more common among men.

GPI was originally considered to be a type of madness due to a dissolute character, when first identified in the early 19th century. The condition's connection with syphilis was discovered in the late 1880s. Progressively, with the discovery of organic arsenicals such as Salvarsan and Neosalvarsan (1910s), the development of pyrotherapy (1920s), and the widespread availability and use of penicillin in the treatment of syphilis (1940s), the condition was rendered avoidable and curable. Prior to this, GPI was inevitably fatal, and it accounted for as much as 25% of the primary diagnoses for residents in public psychiatric hospitals.

== Signs and symptoms ==
Symptoms of the disease first appear from 10 to 30 years after infection. Incipient GPI is usually manifested by neurasthenic difficulties, such as fatigue, headaches, insomnia, dizziness, etc. As the disease progresses, mental deterioration and personality changes occur. Typical symptoms include loss of social inhibitions, asocial behavior, gradual impairment of judgment, concentration and short-term memory difficulties, euphoria, mania, depression, or apathy. Subtle shivering, minor defects in speech and Argyll Robertson pupil may become noticeable.

Delusions, common as the illness progresses, tend to be poorly systematized and absurd. They can be grandiose, melancholic, or paranoid. These delusions include ideas of great wealth, immortality, thousands of lovers, unfathomable power, apocalypsis, nihilism, self-guilt, self-blame, or bizarre hypochondriacal complaints. Later, the patient experiences dysarthria, intention tremors, hyperreflexia, myoclonic jerks, confusion, seizures and severe muscular deterioration. Eventually, the paretic dies bedridden, cachectic and completely disoriented, frequently in a state of status epilepticus.

== Diagnosis ==
The diagnosis could be differentiated from other known psychoses and dementias by a characteristic abnormality in eye pupil reflexes (Argyll Robertson pupil), and, eventually, the development of muscular reflex abnormalities, seizures, memory impairment (dementia) and other signs of relatively pervasive neurocerebral deterioration. Definitive diagnosis is based on the analysis of cerebrospinal fluid and tests for syphilis.

== Prognosis ==
Although there were recorded cases of remission of the symptoms, especially if they had not passed beyond the stage of psychosis, these individuals almost invariably experienced relapse within a few months to a few years. Otherwise, the patient was seldom able to return home because of the complexity, severity and unmanageability of the evolving symptom picture. Eventually, the patient would become completely incapacitated, bed ridden, and would die, the process taking about three to five years on average.

== History ==
While retrospective studies have found earlier instances of what may have been the same disorder, the first clearly identified examples of paresis among the insane were described in Paris after the Napoleonic Wars. General paresis of the insane was first described as a distinct disease in 1822 by Antoine Laurent Jesse Bayle. General paresis most often struck people (men far more frequently than women) between 20 and 40 years of age. By 1877, for example, the superintendent of an asylum for men in New York reported that in his institution this disorder accounted for more than 12% of admissions and more than 2% of deaths.

Originally, the cause was believed to be an inherent weakness of character or constitution. While Friedrich von Esmarch and the psychiatrist Peter Willers Jessen (junior) had asserted as early as 1857 that syphilis caused general paresis (progressive Paralyse), progress toward the general acceptance by the medical community of this idea was only accomplished later by the eminent 19th century syphilographer Jean Alfred Fournier (1832—1914). In 1913 all doubt about the syphilitic nature of paresis was finally eliminated when Hideyo Noguchi and J. W. Moore demonstrated the syphilitic spirochaetes in the brains of paretics.

In 1917 Julius Wagner-Jauregg discovered that malaria therapy (in this case, medical induction of a fever) involving infecting paretic patients with malaria could halt the progression of general paresis. He won a Nobel Prize for this discovery in 1927. After World War II the use of penicillin to treat syphilis made general paresis a rarity: even patients manifesting early symptoms of actual general paresis were capable of full recovery with a course of penicillin. The disorder is now virtually unknown outside developing countries, and even there the epidemiology is substantially reduced.

Some notable cases of general paresis:

- General Ranald S. Mackenzie was retired from the US Army in 1884 for "general paresis of the insane" five years before his death in 1889.
- Theo Van Gogh, brother of painter Vincent van Gogh, died six months after Vincent in 1891 from "dementia parylitica" or what is now called syphilitic paresis.
- The Chicago gangster Al Capone died of syphilitic paresis, having contracted syphilis in a brothel in 1919, and not having been properly treated for it in time to prevent his later onset of syphilitic paresis.

== See also ==
- Karolina Olsson
- Neurosyphilis
- Tabes dorsalis
- Tuskegee experiment
