= Sulfozinum =

Pyrotherapy drug

Colloidal sulphur, better known as the brand name Sulfosin or one of its spelling variants (sulfazin, sulfozin, sulfozine, sulfozinum), is a pharmaceutical drug originally used for its ability to cause a pyrogenic reaction (body temperature elevation). Sulfosin is a 0.37 – 2% sterilized solution of purified elemental sulfur in peach oil or olive oil for intramuscular injections. The preparation is unstable, so it was prepared only in local hospital pharmacies. The intramuscular injection causes a muscle necrosis, fever, immobility, and severe pain.

Sulfosin was introduced to medical use by Danish physician Knud Schroeder in February 1924. It was used for both neurosyphilis "insanity" and psychiatric "instanity", the latter being inspired by the success of pyrotherapy against neurosyphilis. It was modestly effective for the former, but its effectiveness in non-syphilitic/functional psychoses was far less pronounced: in the most hopeful interpretation, it appeared largely ineffective for schizophrenia, completely ineffective for epilepsy, but slightly effective for bipolar disorder. Nevertheless, it was considered useful in comparison to the other available options. As a result it saw considerable use in many parts of the world (especially in Spain), but was phased out when penicillin and shock therapy became available. The Soviet Union, however, consinued to use it for various psychiatric conditions (including politically-motivated diagnoses), and alcoholism. It was not used in American psychiatry.

In medical applications, a number of improvements aimed to reduce the pain associated with Sulfosin: the injection volume was decreased using the more concentrated 2% strength and a topical anesthetic is typically given before hand. There are also compound medications that combined Sulfosin with a topical anesthetic such as benzocaine (Neosulfosin and Anaesthesulf).

== Soviet Union ==
The Soviet Union did not phase out Sulfosin when other parts of the world did. Nevertheless, they did adopt the use of anesthetic before injection when the drug is not used for disciplinary or repressive reasons, specifically 0.5-2 mL of 2% novocaine.

The American delegation during its visit to the USSR in 1989 confirmed charges of the use of Sulfosin injections. Psychiatrists in the USSR employed Sulfosin treatment allegedly to increase treatment response to neuroleptic administration but were unable to present any research evidence of its efficiency for this purpose. The painful effects caused by sulfozine, as well as the pattern of its use in 10 persons, suggest that the medication was applied for punitive rather than therapeutic purposes.

Real benefits of its use in psychiatry are disputable, but it was widely used due to its extremely painful action, lasting from several hours to 2–3 days, as a punishment for psychiatric patients and in political abuse of psychiatry. Sulfozine symbolised Soviet punitive psychiatry.

In 1989, during Perestroika, its use was restricted only to cases when its prescription was confirmed both by consilium and by informed consent of the patient or his representatives. Its present use is not known.

=== In post-Soviet Russia ===
Some psychiatrists in post-Soviet Russia call the criticism of Sulfosin "attacks on psychiatry" and still believe that Sulfosin was sometimes the only effective treatment when all other ones were ineffective in calming down violent patients. The psychiatrists say that Sulfosin really brought a psychosis to remission.

== See also ==
- List of Russian drugs
