= Erik Barnouw =

American broadcasting historian (1908–2001)

Erik Barnouw (June 23, 1908 – July 19, 2001) was an American historian of radio and television broadcasting. At the time of his death, Barnouw was widely considered to be America's most distinguished historian of broadcasting.

== Life ==
According to the Scribner Encyclopedia of American Lives, Erik Barnouw was born in The Hague in the Netherlands, the son of Adriaan (a history teacher), and Ann Eliza Barnouw (who tutored English). The Barnouws came to America in 1919, after the end of World War I when his father became one of the editors of the Weekly Review and later was the Queen Wilhelmina Professor at Columbia University. Erik attended Horace Mann School in New York City. Thereafter Barnouw attended Princeton University where he was an editor of the Nassau Literary Magazine. After the success of his play Open Collars, which he wrote for Princeton's Theatre Intime and which spoofed undergraduate life at the university, Barnouw collaborated with Joshua Logan on the Princeton Triangle Club's musical play Zuider Zee. In the spring of his junior year, he and fellow Princetonian Bretaigne Windust, together with Harvard juniors Charles Crane Leatherbee and Kingsley Perry, contributed $100 each toward founding the University Players, a summer stock company in West Falmouth on Cape Cod, Massachusetts. Over the course of five summers on Cape Cod and two winter seasons in Baltimore, Maryland, the company gave the professional start to the acting careers of such future stars as Margaret Sullavan, Henry Fonda, Joshua Logan, Myron McCormick, Kent Smith, James Stewart, and Mildred Natwick.

Prior to becoming a professor at Columbia University in 1946, Barnouw spent the mid-1930s writing, producing, and directing a number of radio shows for the CBS and NBC radio networks. He also taught Writing for Radio at Columbia on a part-time basis. During World War II he oversaw the Armed Forces Radio Service's education division, based in Washington, D.C. He won a Peabody Award in 1944, for a documentary series, "Words at War."

In 1949, Barnouw worked with the United States Public Health Service on the V. D. Radio Project, a series of programs created to combat syphilis. The V. D. Radio Project featured a variety of programming—PSAs, interviews with doctors and patients, soap operas, and "ballad dramas"—and enlisted the efforts of a wide variety of famous men and women in producing those programs, including Alan Lomax, Adam Clayton Powell Jr., Hank Williams Sr., Jinx Falkenburg, and Henry Fonda.

Barnouw was elected chairman of the Writers Guild of America in 1957 and also served on the Board of Governors of the Academy of Television Arts and Sciences.

In 1978 he became chief of the Library of Congress's newly created Motion Picture, Broadcasting and Recorded Sound Division.

He is best known for his history of U.S. radio and television, a three volume series first published in 1966. Volume 1, "A Tower in Babel," covered radio until 1933; the second volume, "'The Golden Web," covered broadcasting until the 1950s; the final volume, "The Image Empire," discussed the rise and growth of television. The New York Times Book Reviews (28 November 1971, p. BR 59) praised Barnouw's work as "continually readable and sharply observant." Written at the invitation of Oxford University Press, the three volume series "anchored his reputation as the foremost scholar of broadcasting." According to media historian Christopher H. Sterling, before the publication of this trilogy "broadcasting history was then largely restricted to a few popular picture books." Barnouw's publications "added hugely to the legitimacy of broadcasting as an academic subject for study, research, and teaching."

Barnouw is also known for his history of documentary films, and for his film about Hiroshima and Nagasaki, which the L.A. Times said shook the industry. In 1971 Barnouw received a George Polk Award.

He took interest in the history of magic and was the author of the book The Magician and the Cinema (1981) which received positive reviews. He was a friend to the magician John Mulholland. While in high school, Barnouw catalogued Mulholland's books on magic. Since 1983, the Organization of American Historians has awarded the Erik Barnouw Award for films about American history.

In 2001, Barnouw died of an inoperable cancer in Fair Haven, Vermont. The New York Times quoted Sheldon Meyer, his former editor at Oxford University Press, "...Barnouw had an eye for the scoundrels, and the fakes, and the dangerous people. His genius reached generations of Americans across the radio airwaves, on the television screen and in the classroom." Upon reading Media Lost and Found, published only months before Barrow's death, Ken Burns stated, "Barnouw is our keenest observer of the frighteningly complicated world of media. No one has seen more, no one sees more, no one understands more than Barnouw. I am a huge admirer."

== Selected writings ==
- A Tower in Babel: A History of Broadcasting in the United States To 1933, Oxford University Press, 1966.
- The Golden Web: A History of Broadcasting in the United States 1933–1953, Oxford University Press, 1968
- The Image Empire: A History of Broadcasting in the United States from 1953, Oxford University Press, 1970.
- Tube of Plenty: The Evolution of American Television, Oxford University Press, 1976 (second updated edition, 1992).
- Indian Film, Oxford University Press, 1962 (First Edition, 1962, Oxford University Press).
- The Sponsor: Notes on a Modern Potentate, Oxford University Press, 1978 (new edition, 2005).
- Indian Film, Oxford University Press, 1980 (with S. Krishnaswamy).
- The Magician and the Cinema, Oxford University Press, 1981.
- International Encyclopedia of Communications, Oxford University Press, 1989. (editor)
- Documentary: A History of the Non-Fiction Film, Oxford University Press, 1993.
- Media Marathon, Duke University Press, 1996 (an autobiography).
- Media Lost and Found, Fordham University Press, 2001.

== Films ==
- Hiroshima Nagasaki August, 1945, 1970
  - This film compiles footage shot shortly after the bombing by both Japanese and American cameramen.
  - The original footage was classified as "Secret" for decades and was only released to U.S. National Archives in 1967.
