= Pyrotherapy =

Raising body temperature for medical purposes

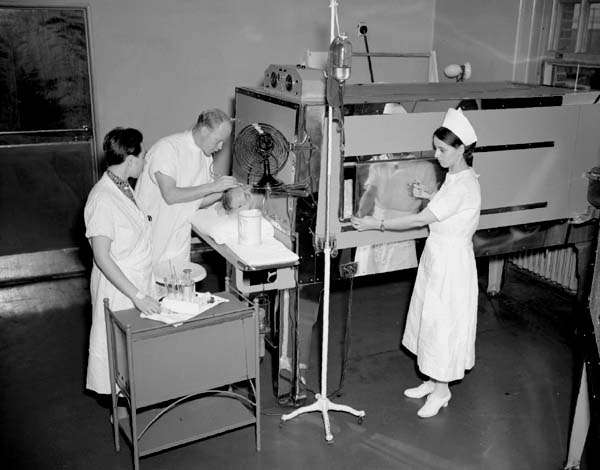
- Patient being treated with "fever therapy" in a Kettering hypertherm cabinet, U.S. Marine Hospital, New Orleans, 1937
- Other names: therapeutic fever

Pyrotherapy (artificial fever) is a method of treatment by raising the body temperature or sustaining an elevated body temperature using a fever. In general, the body temperature was maintained at 41 °C (105 °F). Many diseases were treated by this method in the first half of the 20th century.

The technique reached its peak of sophistication in the early 20th century with malariotherapy, in which Plasmodium vivax, a causative agent of malaria, was allowed to infect already ill patients in order to produce intense fever for therapeutic ends. The sophistication of this approach lay in using effective anti-malarial drugs to control the P. vivax infection, while maintaining the fever it causes to the detriment of other, ongoing, and then-incurable infections present in the patient, such as late-stage syphilis. This type of pyrotherapy was most famously used by psychiatrist Julius Wagner-Jauregg, who won the Nobel Prize for Medicine in 1927 for his elaboration of the procedure in treating neurosyphilitics.

== Use ==
=== Syphilis ===
Wagner-Jauregg's 1917 treatment method, also known as malariotherapy, involved the introduction of Plasmodium vivax malaria via injection into patients with advanced stages of syphilis. Advanced syphilitic infection can invade the brain causing neurosyphilis, affecting neural performance and function, which can in turn lead to general paresis of the insane (GPI), a severely debilitating mental disorder. Doing so induced high-grade (103 °F, 39.4 °C or above) fever that was easily sustainable to eradicate invading spirochaetal bacterium Treponema pallidum, the pathogen responsible for syphilitic infection. Successive rounds of treatment were required to fully eradicate the infectious bacteria, while simultaneously using quinine to treat the malaria infection. Management of the fevers was risky as malaria fevers can sometimes cause death, but syphilis was a proliferate and terminal disease at the time with no other viable treatment. This procedure was used to treat syphilis until penicillin was found to be a safer, more effective measure in the 1940s.

The general paresis of the insane caused by neurosyphilis was effectively overcome by the method.

==== Effectiveness ====
In 1921, Wagner-Jauregg reported impressive success and many other physicians attempting malaria-induced pyrotherapy made similar claims. Later analyses have shown this might not have been true since approximately 60% would relapse within 2 years and 3–20% died from the resulting fevers. Significant consideration should be used here, as syphilis was considered deadly and without other treatment options pyrotherapy was used as a heroic measure.

==== Later development ====
Ever since the effectiveness of malaria against neurosyphilis (called "progressive paralysis" in contemporary literature) was demonstrated, researchers had tried to look for a safer, possibly non-infectious alternative to malaria. In 1931, Wagner-Jauregg surmised that studies available by then appear to show that microbe-derived pyrogens appear to have a greater effect than pyrogens from other sources (e.g. Phlogetan). He found the state of the science used by then unconvincing as few were controlled experiments, but at the same time he believed it would be unethical to keep patients from accessing what he believed to be an effective procedure (malaria). This lead him to invent the use of alternation to generate treatment comparison groups in a study that compared malaria against Saprovitan and Pyrifer. Neither had a remotely comparable effect.

=== Psychiatry ===
The success of malaria pyrotherapy against the insanity caused by neurosyphilis lead to an interest in using it for psychiatry, especially for schizophrenia. The risk of malaria was well-understood and many non-infectous agents were tried, including:

- Biological agents: milk, chemically modified milk protein (Phlogetan), tuberculin, chancre vaccine (Dmelcos), antityphus and smallpox vaccines, active saprophytic microbes (Saprovitan), E. coli protein extract (Pyrifer), Pseudomonas aeruginosa and Salmonella typhi lipopolysaccharide (Pyrogenal [pirogenal])
- Chemical agents: sulfozinum (Sulfosin), subcutaneous turpentine essence (which provokes a fixation abscess), intravenous metals such as colloidal silver (Electrargol).
- Physical methods: hot baths and long-wave, short Hertzian wave, hot air, and infrared diathermy.

Among these, sulfozinum (sulfur dissolved in oil, intramuscular injection) was the preferred treatment in most parts of the world: it was fairly cheap and appeared relatively effective (at least for neurosyphilis), the main downside being the pain that it inflicts on the patient. Its effectiveness in non-syphilitic/functional psychoses was less pronounced, being largely ineffective for schizophrenia, completely ineffective for epilepsy, but slightly effective for bipolar disorder. Nevertheless, it was considered useful in comparison to the other options at the time.

Sulfozinum was replaced when more effective methods – penicilin for neurosyphilis, shock therapy for the rest – became available in most of the world. The exception is the Soviet Union, where it maintained a significant presence in Soviet psychiatry and in repressive apparatuses of the state, becoming a symbol of punitive psychiatry. It remains sporadically used in Russia and the other former Soviet republics.

(The Soviet Union did pursue the study of alternate pyrogens. One that saw considerable use in psychiatry was Pyrogenal, developed in he 1950s by Moscow’s Gamaleya Institute directed by Juan Planelles.)
