= Julius Wagner-Jauregg =

Austrian physician and nobelist (1857–1940)

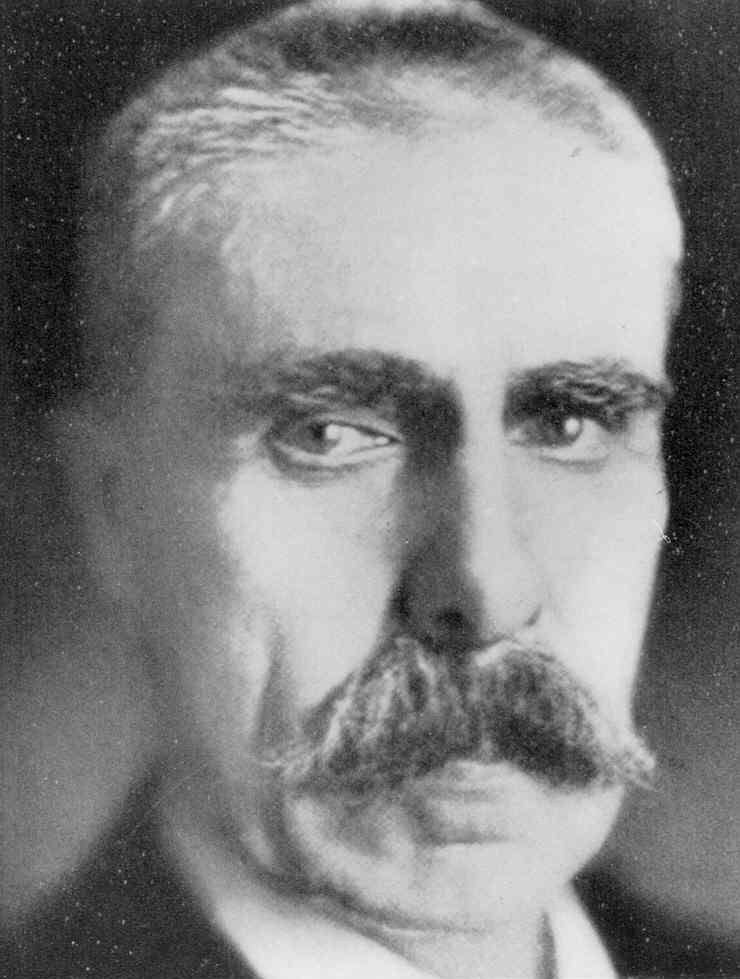
- Born: Julius Wagner; 7 March 1857; Wels, Austrian Empire
- Died: 27 September 1940 (aged 83); Vienna, Nazi Germany
- Other name: Julius Wagner
- Education: University of Vienna (MD, 1880)
- Known for: Malariotherapy
- Spouse(s): Balbine Frumkin (divorced 1903); Anna Koch (married 1899)
- Children: 2
- Awards: Nobel Prize in Physiology or Medicine (1927); Cameron Prize for Therapeutics of the University of Edinburgh (1935)
- Scientific career
- Fields: Pathology; Psychiatry
- Institutions: University of Vienna; University of Graz; State Lunatic Asylum at Steinhof
- Thesis: L'origine et la fonction du coeur accélére (Origin and function of the accelerated heart) (1880)
- Doctoral advisor: Salomon Stricker
- Notable students: Wilhelm Reich

Signature
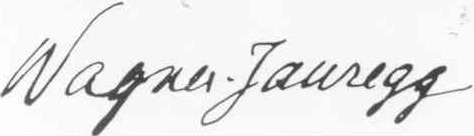

Julius Wagner-Jauregg (Austrian German: [ˈjuːli̯ʊs ˈvaːɡnɐ ˈjaʊrɛk]; 7 March 1857 – 27 September 1940) was an Austrian physician who won the Nobel Prize in Physiology or Medicine in 1927, and is the first psychiatrist to have done so. His Nobel award was "for his discovery of the therapeutic value of malaria inoculation in the treatment of dementia paralytica".

== Early life ==
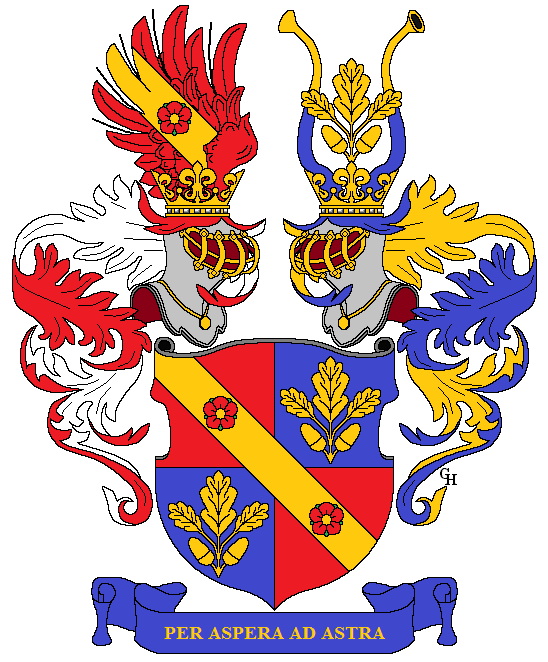
Wagner-Jauregg family arms, granted in 1883.

Julius Wagner-Jauregg was born Julius Wagner on 7 March 1857 in Wels, Upper Austria, the son of Adolph Johann Wagner and Ludovika Jauernigg Ranzoni. His family name was changed to "Wagner von Jauregg" when his father was given the title of "Ritter von Jauregg" (a hereditary title of nobility) in 1883 by the Austro-Hungarian Empire. Hence he retained the name Julius Wagner Ritter von Jauregg until 1918 when the empire was dissolved, and nobility was abolished. The family name was then contracted to "Wagner-Jauregg". He attended the Schottengymnasium in Vienna before going on to study Medicine at the University of Vienna from 1874 to 1880, where he also studied with Salomon Stricker in the Institute of General and Experimental Pathology. He obtained his doctorate in 1880 with the thesis "L'origine et la fonction du cœur accéléré." He left the institute in 1882.

After leaving the clinic, he conducted laboratory experiments with animals, which was practiced very little at this time. From 1883 to 1887 he worked with Maximilian Leidesdorf in the Psychiatric Clinic, although his original training was not in the pathology of the nervous system. In 1889 he succeeded the famous Richard von Krafft-Ebing at the Neuro-Psychiatric Clinic of the University of Graz, and started his research on Goitre, cretinism and iodine. In 1893 he became Extraordinary Professor of Psychiatry and Nervous Diseases, and Director of the Clinic for Psychiatry and Nervous Diseases in Vienna, as successor to Theodor Meynert. A student and assistant of Wagner-Jauregg during this time was Constantin von Economo.

Ten years later, in 1902, Wagner-Jauregg moved to the psychiatric clinic at the General Hospital and in 1911 he returned to his former post.

== Criminal inquest ==
Wagner-Jauregg was angered by what he considered as the malingering of soldiers who claimed to be too mentally upset to return to the battlefield. He applied extreme electric shock therapy to these soldiers, which caused large numbers of deaths. After the end of the war, the German government opened an inquest into these activities, with the goal of prosecuting him criminally. Sigmund Freud intervened to save Wagner-Jauregg's career.

== Nobel prize ==
Wagner-Jauregg (center right in black jacket) watching a transfusion from a malaria patient (rear of the group) to a neurosyphilis victim (center) in 1934

The main work pursued by Wagner-Jauregg throughout his life was related to the treatment of mental disease by inducing a fever, an approach known as pyrotherapy. In 1887 he investigated the effects of febrile diseases on psychoses, making use of the streptococci that cause erysipelas and tuberculin (the latter discovered in 1890 by Robert Koch). Since these methods of treatment did not work very well, he tried in 1917 the inoculation of malaria parasites, which proved to be very successful in the case of dementia paralytica (also called general paresis of the insane), caused by neurosyphilis, at that time a terminal disease. It had been observed that some who develop high fevers would be cured of syphilis. Thus, from 1917 to the mid 1940s, malaria induced by the least aggressive parasite, Plasmodium vivax, was used as treatment for tertiary syphilis because it produced prolonged and high fevers (a form of pyrotherapy). This was considered an acceptable risk because the malaria could later be treated with quinine, which was available at that time. This discovery earned him the Nobel Prize in Medicine in 1927. His main publication was a book titled Verhütung und Behandlung der progressiven Paralyse durch Impfmalaria (Prevention and treatment of progressive paralysis by malaria inoculation) in the Memorial Volume of the Handbuch der experimentellen Therapie, (1931). The technique was known as malariotherapy; however, it was dangerous, killing about 15% of patients, so it is no longer in use.

In 1935, he was awarded the Cameron Prize for Therapeutics of the University of Edinburgh.

== Involuntary sterilizations ==
Wagner-Jauregg administered thyroid and ovarian preparations to young psychotic patients who had experienced delayed puberty, which led to the development of their secondary sexual characteristics and diminished psychosis. Other patients were deemed schizophrenic because of excessive masturbation, where Wagner-Jauregg sterilized them, resulting in an "improved" condition.

== Retirement ==
In 1928, Wagner-Jauregg retired from his post but remained active and in good health until his death on 27 September 1940. In his retirement he published nearly 80 scientific papers. Many schools, roads and hospitals are named after him in Austria.

== Nazi ideology and affiliation ==
Towards his last days Wagner-Jauregg was influenced by Adolf Hitler's German nationalism, and became an anti-Semite and sympathizer of Nazism. Documentary evidence indicates that he supported the Nazi Party shortly after the invasion of Austria in 1938 by Germany. However, a denazification commission in Austria found that his application for NSDAP membership had been refused "...on grounds of race", as his first wife Balbine Frumkin was Jewish.

Wagner-Jauregg advocated a racial hygiene ideology called eugenics, influencing students such as Alexander Pilcz, who went on to author a standard handbook on racial psychiatry critical of Jews for being prone to mental illness.

He was also an advocate of forced sterilization of the mentally ill and criminal, having endorsed the concept in 1935 while a member of the Austrian Anthropological Society.

He was President of the Austrian League for Racial Regeneration and Heredity, which advocated sterilization for those of inferior genetics.

== See also ==
- Wilhelm Reich
