= Felix Milgrom =

Polish American immunologist

- Born: October 12, 1919; Rohatyn, then Poland, now Ukraine
- Died: September 2, 2007 (aged 87); Buffalo, New York
- Education: University of Wroclaw
- Spouse(s): Halina Miszel (m. 1941–2007)
- Children: Henry; Martin Louis
- Scientific career
- Fields: Immunology
- Workplaces: Wrocław Medical University; Medical University of Silesia; University at Buffalo

Felix Milgrom (12 October 1919 – 2 September 2007) was a Polish American immunologist who was State University of New York Distinguished Professor Emeritus at the University at Buffalo School of Medicine and Biomedical Sciences. He is best known for the development of a simple test for syphilis that could be performed on a drop of dried blood.

== Biography ==
Milgrom was born in Rohatyn, Poland in 1919. Initially a student at the University of Lwow, he earned a medical degree from the Wrocław Medical University in 1946, becoming a docent in 1951.

He taught at the Wrocław Medical University and led the microbiology department at the Medical University of Silesia. He joined the Department of Microbiology at the University at Buffalo School of Medicine and Biomedical Sciences in 1958.

He was the chairman of the Department of Microbiology at the University at Buffalo School of Medicine and Biomedical Sciences from 1967 to 1985. Milgrom was named a SUNY Distinguished Professor in 1981. Together with Ernest Witebsky and others, Milgram established what is now known as the Witebsky Center for Microbial Pathogenesis and Immunology.

Milgrom authored 400 articles and other publications, including several books. The president of Collegium Internationale Allergologicum from 1978 to 1982, Milgrom was a member of the Polish Academy of Arts and Sciences, American Society for Microbiology, and Sigma Xi.

He received honorary degrees from the University of Vienna, the University of Lund, the University of Heidelberg, the University of Bergen, and the University of Medicine and Dentistry of New Jersey. He has been awarded the Cross of Merit, a Polish state decoration. Milgrom is a recipient of the Alfred Jurzykowski Foundation Prize (1986) and the Paul Ehrlich and Ludwig Darmstaedter Prize (1987).

== Personal life ==
He married Halina Miszel, a noted physician, on October 15, 1941. They have two children, Henry and Martin Louis. Henry Milgrom is a Professor of Pediatrics at the University of Colorado Denver.

== Bibliography ==
- Felix Milgrom, Pioneering Immunologist, UB Faculty Member, Dies at 87, University of Buffalo official statement
- Abeyounis, C John (2008). "Felix Milgrom. October 12, 1919 to September 2, 2007". Int. Arch. Allergy Immunol. 146 (2): 174–5. doi:10.1159/000113523. PMID 18204286.
- "Proceedings of the 5th Basic Sciences Symposium of the Transplantation Society. A festschrift honoring Felix Milgrom. Chautauqua, New York, USA. September 6–11, 1997". Transplant. Proc. 31 (3): 4 p preceding 1441, 1441–98. May 1999. PMID 10357685.
- Bash, J A (May 1999). "Reflections on my mentor, Felix Milgrom". Transplant. Proc. 31 (3): 1458–9. doi:10.1016/S0041-1345(99)00156-6. PMID 10330970.
- Rapaport, F T (May 1999). "Felix Milgrom, immunologist and microbiologist par excellence". Transplant. Proc. 31 (3): 1452–5. doi:10.1016/S0041-1345(99)00006-8. PMID 10330968.
