= V. D. Radio Project =

American public health campaign

- Commercial?: No
- Type of project: Public Health Radio Campaign
- Location: New York, NY
- Country: United States
- Key people: Erik Barnouw, Alan Lomax, Lefoy Richman
- Funding: Public Health Service

The V. D. Radio Project was a public health campaign created by the United States Public Health Service in 1949 to combat syphilis.

In 1949, taking advantage of the recently developed treatments of the sexually transmitted disease involving penicillin, the United States Public Health Service enlisted the help of radio veteran and Columbia University professor Erik Barnouw to create a series of radio programs intended to raise awareness and to influence the millions of men and women suffering from the disease to seek help. Targeting the rural south and industrial north, the V. D. Radio Project created a variety of programming, including public service announcements from various entertainers and politicians, interviews with patients and doctors, soap operas, and what they called "ballad dramas" or "hillbilly operas". The ballad dramas were the brainchild of folklorist Alan Lomax, who enlisted country, folk, and gospel superstars to perform their music in dramatic programs tailor-made for their talents and personae. Performers in the ballad dramas included Woody Guthrie, Sister Rosetta Tharpe, Hank Williams, Roy Acuff, and Merle Travis, among others.
