= Yuzuan yizong jinjian =

1742 Chinese medical text

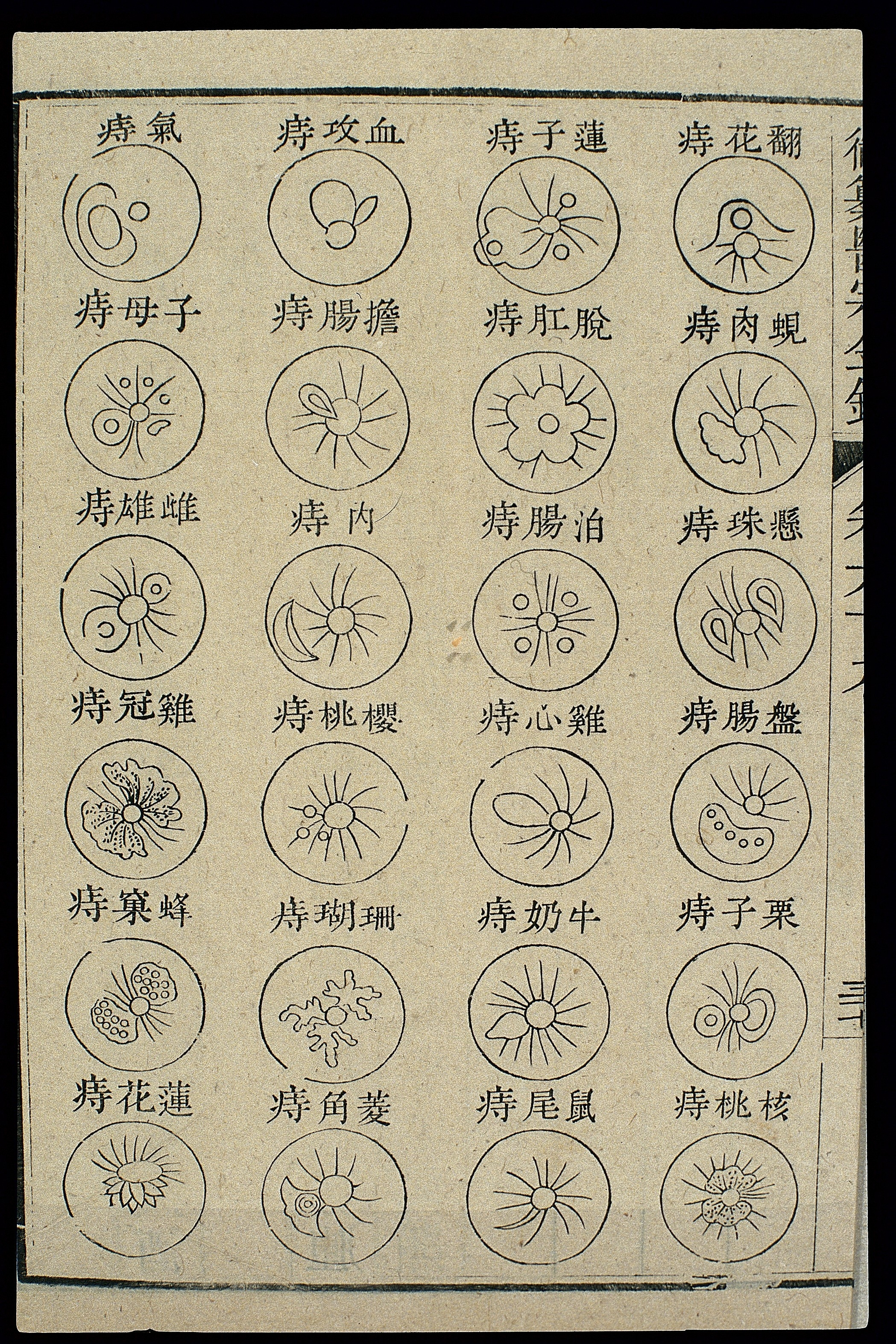
Diagram detailing 24 types of haemorrhoids.

The Yuzuan yizong jinjian (Chinese: 御纂醫宗金鑑; pinyin: Yùzuǎn yīzōng jīnjiàn) (Note: Various English translations include the Imperially Sponsored Golden Mirror of Medical Orthodoxy, the Imperially Commissioned Golden Mirror of the Orthodox Lineage of Medicine, or the Commissioned Golden Mirror of Medical Learning. It is also simply referred to as the Golden Mirror.) is a Chinese medical compendium published in 1742 AD, during the Qing dynasty. Described as "one of the best treatises on general medicine of modern times", it was a project sanctioned by the Qianlong Emperor and published by the Imperial Printing Office.

== Contents ==
The text is divided into ninety juan or volumes: seventy-four volumes pertain to internal medicine, while the remaining sixteen concern general surgery. More than a quarter of the text reproduces, with added commentary, two parts of an earlier work written by Zhang Zhongjing, the Shanghan zabing lun (Treatise on Cold Damage and Miscellaneous Disorders); Zhang's work is presented by the authors of the Yuzuan yizong jinjian as foundational to Chinese medical orthodoxy.

It also contains what is "probably the largest ensemble of illustrations in a single Chinese medical text", with some 484 such depictions of the human body, ranging from images of children's hands to a "one-page array of 24 anuses". Depictions of smallpox—a disease that was especially deadly to the ruling Manchurians—are particularly prominent and detailed.

== Publication history ==
An initiative of the Qianlong Emperor that was announced on 17 December 1739, the Yuzuan yizong jinjian was published in 1742 by the Imperial Printing Office, which designated it as a national textbook. The text had some eighty contributors, including thirty-nine members of the Imperial Academy of Medicine, most of whom came from the Jiangnan region, specifically the southern provinces of Anhui, Jiangsu, and Zhejiang. Imperial Physicians (Note: Imperial Physician was the highest rank that a physician at the Imperial Academy of Medicine could have obtained.) Wu Qian (吳謙) and Liu Yuduo (劉裕鐸) served as editors-in-chief, under the supervision of Manchu official Ortai.

== Legacy ==
The Yuzuan yizong jinjian has been noted for "its breadth, editorial accuracy, medical coverage, and use of mnemonic rhymes". Moreover, it has "attained the status of a canonical medical classic which, even today, remains obligatory reading for scholars and practitioners of traditional Chinese medicine." K. Chimin Wong and Liande Wu, writing in the History of Chinese Medicine (1973), describe the text as "one of the best treatises on general medicine of modern times."
