= Malaria therapy =

Medical procedure of treating diseases using artificial injection of malaria parasites

The malaria therapy (or malaria inoculation, and sometimes malariotherapy) is an archaic medical procedure of treating diseases using artificial injection of malaria parasites. It is a type of pyrotherapy (or pyretotherapy) by which high fever is induced to stop or eliminate symptoms of certain diseases. In malaria therapy, malarial parasites (Plasmodium) are specifically used to cause fever, and an elevated body temperature reduces the symptoms of or cures the diseases. After the primary disease has been treated, the malaria is then cured using antimalarial drugs, with quinine having been historically used. The method was developed by Austrian physician Julius Wagner-Jauregg in 1917 for the treatment of neurosyphilis for which he received the 1927 Nobel Prize in Physiology or Medicine.

== Background ==
The beneficial effects of infections in mental problems were known in the Ancient world. Hippocrates in the 4th century BCE recorded bacterial infections such as dysentery and dropsy reducing the symptoms of madness; and that malaria (quartan fever) could stop epileptic convulsions. Galen in the 2nd century CE described a case of mental illness that ended after malarial infection. There are medical records from the 19th century which indicate that insanity stopped temporarily or permanently when the individuals had severe infections.

Russian psychiatrist Alexander Samoilovich Rosenblum was the first to experimentally use infections for the treatment of psychosis. In 1876, he induced fever in psychotic individuals using malaria, typhoid, and relapsing fever. He claimed that he cured 50% of all those he treated. However, his work was not widely known as his publication in 1877 was in a small journal in Odesa, Ukraine, and written in Russian. He also preferred not to spread his findings. He understood that it was a dangerous experiment and potentially controversial. It was, however, reported by J. Motschukoffsky in a German medical journal Centralblatt für die Medicinischen Wissenschaften, but the underlying cause of how malaria cured psychosis was not understood, and Rosenblum's experiment remained unknown for several decades. Rosenblum never repeated the study or tried to develop specific methods for the medical treatment. The importance of the study was realised only in 1938 when Austrian physician Julius Wagner-Jauregg discussed the research at the International Neurological Congress in London.

In 1943, Samuel J. Zakon at the Northwestern University Medical School in Chicago, US, acquired the original paper of Rosenblum and published an English translation with commentary in the Journal of the American Medical Association. The commentary concluded:

Rosenblium [alternative spelling] was certainly the first to appreciate the curative effect of fever itself on the psychoses. He understood and reported on the value of malaria and typhoid in the treatment of mental disease. He was the first to inoculate psychotic patients with a febrile disease. Rosenblium, though practically forgotten for over half a century, must be acknowledged as the true pioneer in this field.

== Rediscovery and clinical application ==
Although the priority of using malaria therapy in brain disorders is generally attributed to Rosenblum, the credit of developing malaria therapy as a standard medical practice and explaining the underlying scientific principle is to Austrian physician Julius Wagner-Jauregg. Wagner-Jauregg, working at the First Psychiatry Clinic at the Asylum of Lower Austria, investigated cases of brain disorders since 1883, publishing his first paper on psychosis in 1887 titled "Über die Einwirkung fieberhafter Erkrankungen auf Psychosen" ("The Effect of Feverish Disease on Psychoses"). He soon realised that a severe type of psychosis was related to neurosyphilis, an infection of the central nervous system with syphilis (caused by a bacterium identified in 1905 as Spirochaeta pallida, later renamed Treponema pallidum). Syphilis was at the time a deadly disease characterised by delusions, paralysis, and dementia; and known as "The Great Pox" and the "disease of the century." Neurosyphilis was prevalent in Europe during the 19th century, leading to an increased asylum population during this period.

Wagner-Jauregg came to the conclusion that fever could cure psychosis after reviewing his own experiments and the historical accounts based on three phenomena: (a) the appearance of fever coincided with the disappearance of the symptoms of psychosis in medical history; (b) his findings that fever was the only possible cause for the cure of psychosis; and (c) although all psychotic individuals were not cured, the number of cures increased whenever malaria spread. He made three postulates:

1. The agent of treatment, febrile disease, while curing mental disorder, can still induce disease in healthy people.
2. Febrile disease strengthens (makes healthier) individuals with mental disorder.
3. Elevation of body temperature due to febrile disease is key to suppressing psychotic symptoms.
